= Western riding (horse show) =

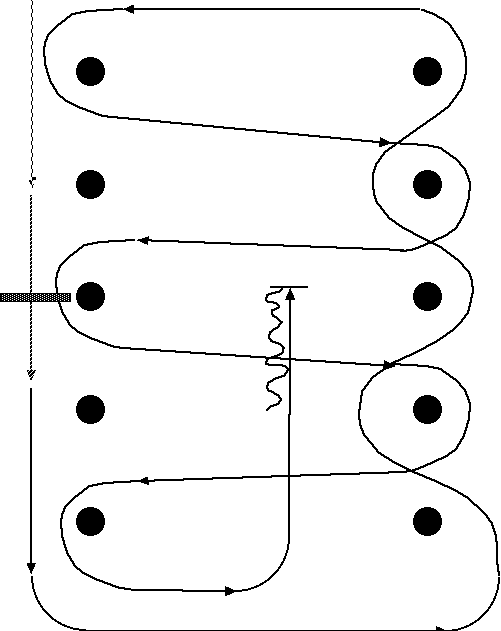
A western riding pattern

Western riding is a competitive event at American horse shows, particularly those for stock horse breeds such as the American Quarter Horse. It is not to be confused with the general term "western riding," referring to the many forms of equestrianism where riders use a western saddle; instead, it refers to a particular class where the horse and rider complete a pattern that incorporates elements of both reining and trail classes, but requiring horses to perform in a quiet style akin to that of a Western pleasure class. Horses are evaluated on “quality of gaits, lead changes at the lope, response to the rider, manners and disposition." While all three gaits are required, most of the pattern is performed at a lope. Emphasis is placed on the horse's smoothness, even cadence, and precise, clean flying lead changes.

== Procedure ==
Each horse performs individually. There are usually four patterns from which a judge may choose, all containing a walk, a jog, a jog over a log, a lope, a lope over a log, a jog to lope transition, a large serpentine with four "crossing lead" changes, a shallow serpentine with 3-4 line lead changes, a halt and a rein back. All lead changes are required to be completed within the designated lead change area.

== Lead Changes ==
Lead changes are the most important part of competition, though they are not all that the horse is judged on. All lead changes are to be precise, performed in the center of the markers in the designated lead change area, switching both front and hind leads simultaneously while maintaining frame and composure. The horse is to be responsive and quiet.

== Example of a Pattern ==
Pattern One from the AQHA Hand Book Show Rules 453B Western Riding can be described as follows: The horse enters the ring at a walk. It passes the starting cone and continues walking a few strides before jogging. It is traveling down a long side of the arena. Once it jogs, it jogs over the log, which has cones placed to either side of it. Once it has crossed the log and all four feet are on the second side of the log the horse picks up a lope. It lopes around the short end of the arena passing a cone on its left. Now the horse is moving down the second long side of the arena. Once it has passed the cone, it moves left switching its lead to the right lead. The horse passes the next cone on its right and starts shifting right switching its lead to the left. The horse will continue on this shallow serpentine through the cones for four loops completing the four line changes.

Effectively about half of the pattern is completed. Next, the horse will continue on his left lead down the second short end of the arena turning at another cone for a 180-degree turn at a lope. It will cross the arena completely making a lead change in the middle between the last cone and the next cone. Passing this cone on its right the horse will do another 180-degree at a lope continuing this large serpentine pattern around the cones for a total of four lead changes all completed around the centerline of the arena. During the large serpentine, the horse will lope over the log while loping around the cone. Once the horse has completed all the lead changes, it will pass its last cone on the left. Now it will do a 270-degree circle loping up the centerline of the arena. It will halt in line with the cones at the center of the pattern backing.

== Scoring ==
The scoring method is very similar to that of reining. The scores will be on a scale of 0–100 with a 70 being an average score basis. Points are added or subtracted based on credits or faults observed.

- A contestant shall be penalized each time the following

occur: One-half (1/2) point

- (1) tick or light touch of log
- (2) hind legs skipping or coming together during lead change
- (3) non-simultaneous lead change (Front to hind or hind

to front)

One point

- (1) hitting or rolling log
- (2) out of lead more than one stride either side of the

center point and between the markers

- (3) splitting the log (log between the two front or two hind

feet) at the lope

- (4) break of gait at the walk or jog up to two strides

Three points

- (1) not performing the specific gait (jog or lope) or not

stopping when called for in the pattern, within 10 feet (3.0 meters) of the designated area

- (2) simple change of leads
- (3) out of lead at or before the marker prior to the designated

change area or out of lead at or after the marker after the designated change area

- (4) additional lead changes anywhere in pattern (except

when correcting an extra change or incorrect lead)

- (5) in pattern one and three failure to start the lope within

30 feet (9.1 meters) after crossing the log at the jog

- (6) break of gait at walk or jog for more than two strides
- (7) break of gait at the lope

Five points

- (1) Out of lead beyond the next designated change area

(note: failures to change, including cross-cantering. Two consecutive failures to change would result in two five point penalties). 175

- (2) blatant disobedience including kicking out, biting,

bucking and rearing Disqualified - 0 score

- (1) illegal equipment
- (2) willful abuse
- (3) off course
- (4) knocking over markers
- (5) completely missing log
- (6) major refusal - stop and back more than 2 strides or 4

steps with front legs

- (7) major disobedience or schooling
- (8) failure to start lope prior to end cone in patterns #1 and #3
- (9) four or more simple lead changes and/or failures to

change leads

- (10) overturn of more than 1/4 turn

(11) Faults, which will be cause for disqualification, except in novice amateur or novice youth classes, which shall be faults scored according to severity:

- (A) Head carried too low (tip of ear below withers

consistently)

- (B) Over flexing or straining neck in head carriage so

the nose is carried behind the vertical consistently.

- (g) The following characteristics are considered faults and

should be judged accordingly in maneuver scores

- (1) opening mouth excessively
- (2) anticipating signals
- (3) stumbling
- (4) head carried too high
- (5) head carried too low (tip of ear below the withers)
- (6) over-flexing or straining neck in head carriage so the

nose is carried behind the vertical

- (7) excessive nosing out

Credit is given for

- (1) changes of leads, hind and front simultaneously
- (2) change of lead near the center point of the lead change area
- (3) accurate and smooth pattern
- (4) even pace throughout
- (5) easy to guide and control with rein and leg
- (6) manners and disposition
- (7) conformation and fitness

== See also ==
- Reining
- Trail (horse show)
- Western pleasure
