= Bridle path (horse) =

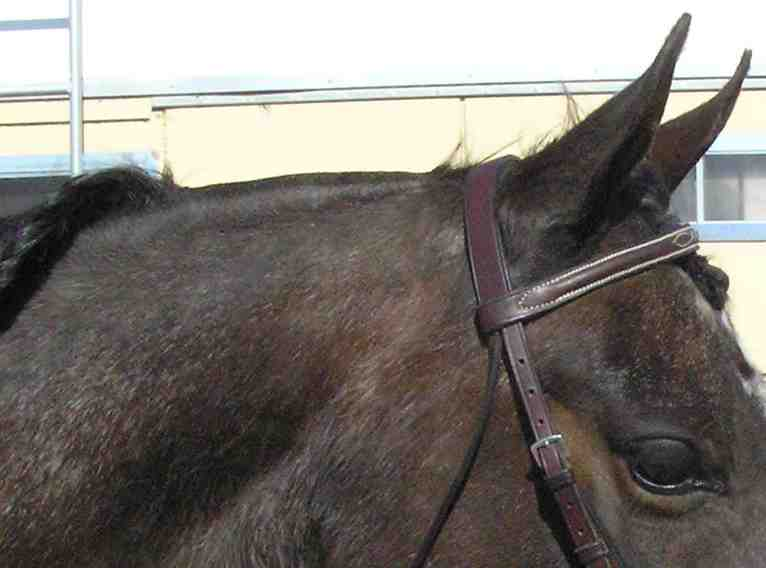
A shaved bridle path in the mane of a horse.

The bridle path is a shaved or clipped section of the mane, beginning behind the ears of a horse at the poll, delineating the area where the crownpiece of the bridle lies. Bridle paths are a common style of grooming in the United States, but are not seen as often in Europe.

== Grooming ==
A bridle path is usually clipped or shaved in the mane for competition in certain disciplines, and this may be done on ordinary riding horses as well. A bridle path allows the bridle or halter to lie flat on the head of the horse, which may be more comfortable. It also is thought to give the horse the appearance of a slimmer throatlatch, a generally desirable conformation trait.

If the bridle path is cut too far, it can take up to 6 months for the mane to grow back to a length that allows it to lie over neatly, and as long as a year to reach its fullest possible natural length. Grooms usually start clipping the bridle path by working from the desired end of the bridle path towards the ears, as clipping from the ears backwards may result in a longer bridle path than desired.

== Bridle path length ==
The length of the bridle path often varies between the equestrian disciplines and breeds. Bridle paths are common in the United States, less so in Europe. In the USA, the following standards are common:

- The Hunter-type English riding disciplines, including dressage, show jumping, eventing, and hunt seat equitation, prefer a short bridle path of 1-2 inches. This length is also appropriate for certain breeds, including Thoroughbreds and Warmbloods.
- Saddle seat and fine harness horses are shown with a longer bridle path of at least 8 inches. It is usually appropriate for use on breeds associated with these disciplines, even when certain individual animals are shown in-hand or under saddle in other disciplines. Breeds clipped to a "Saddle type" style include American Saddlebreds, Tennessee Walking Horses, National Show Horses, Arabians, and Morgans.
- The Western riding disciplines, including the western performance disciplines such as reining and western pleasure, generally cut a bridle path that is as long as the length of the horse's ear when laid flat back against the mane, generally no more than 6 to 8 inches. Stock horse breeds, including Quarter Horses, American Paint Horses, and Appaloosas, use this style of cut.
- Andalusians generally never have a bridle path longer than 1 inch.
- Peruvian Pasos are sometimes prohibited to have a bridle path by certain show organizations.
- Icelandic horses generally do not have a bridle path clipped.
