= Horse showmanship =

Event at horse shows, exhibiting the animal

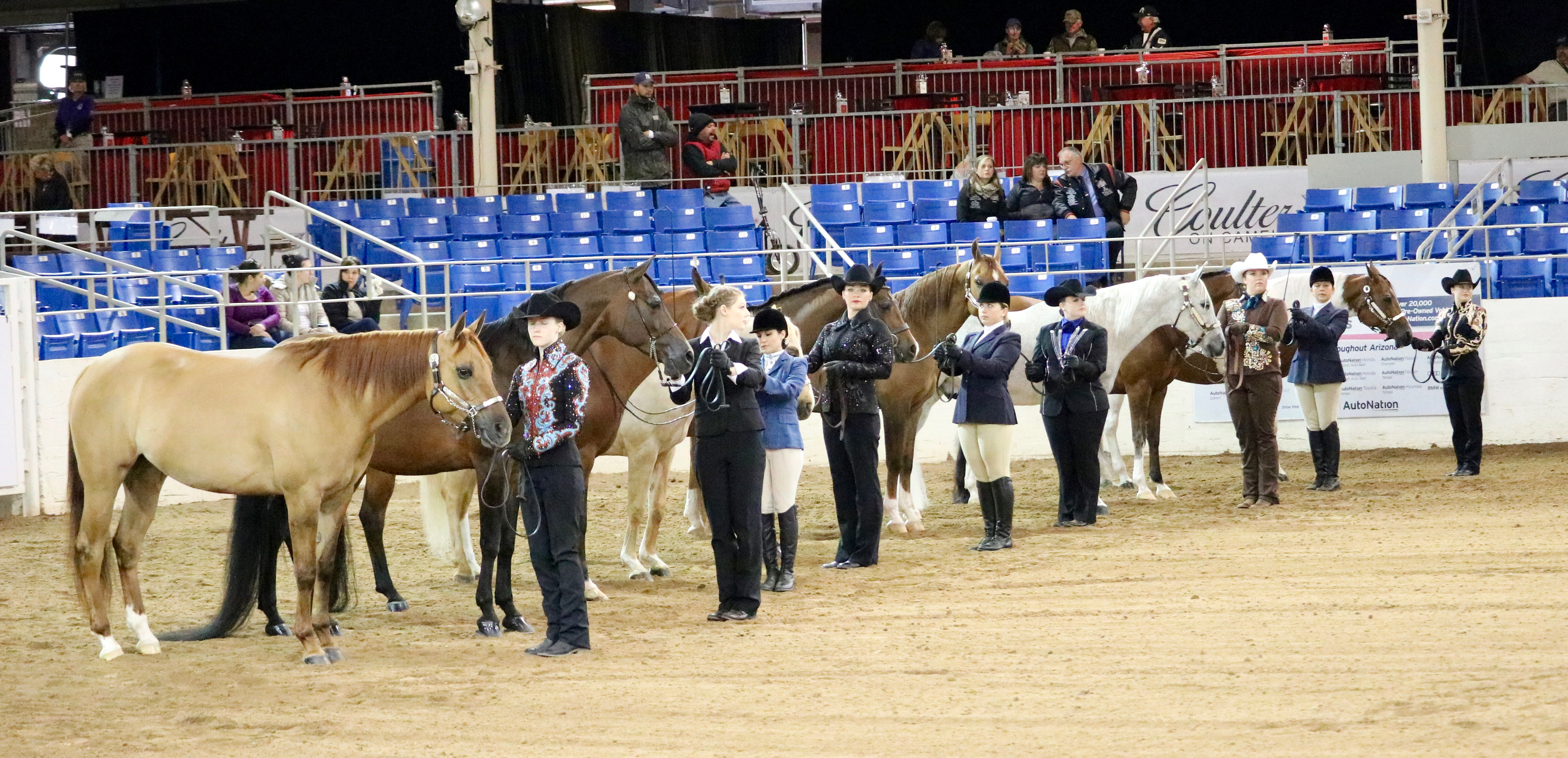
Adult competitors at the Scottsdale Arabian Horse Show

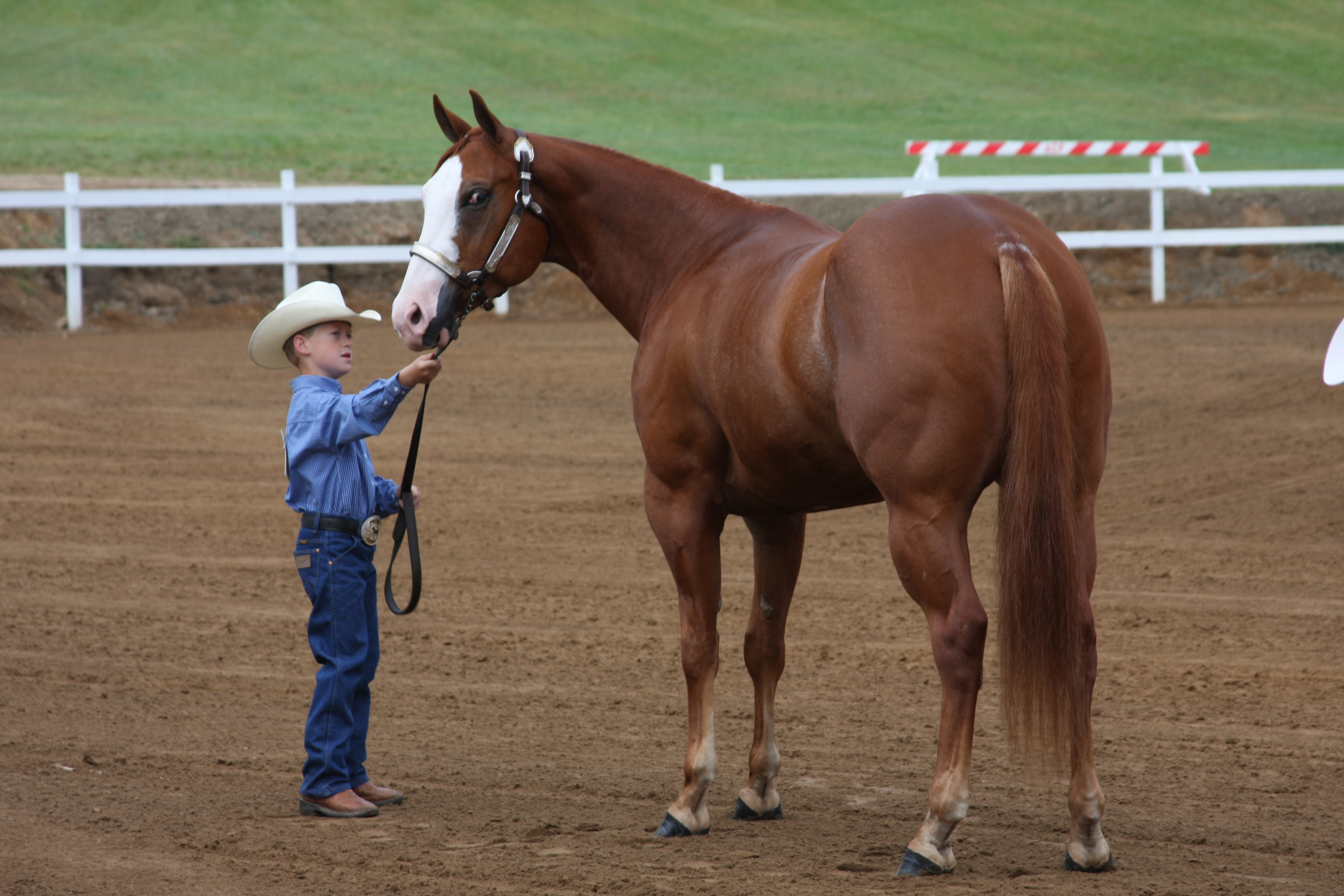
A competitor showing his stock horse in a 4-H style showmanship class.

Showmanship is an event found at many horse shows. The class is also sometimes called "Fitting and Showmanship", "Showmanship In-Hand", "Showmanship at Halter" or "Halter Showmanship" It involves a person on the ground leading a horse, wearing a halter or bridle, through a series of maneuvers called a pattern. The horse itself is not judged on its conformation. Exhibitors are judged on exhibiting the animal to its best advantage, with additional scoring for the grooming and presentation of both horse and handler.

Showmanship began as a component of 4-H competition for young people, to teach them how to present a horse in-hand. Over time, it expanded into most breed competition at regular horse shows as well and has become a highly competitive event with exacting standards at the highest level. Yet, it also remains a standard competition in 4-H and other schooling shows for beginners.

Most showmanship classes in the United States use western style horses, clothing and equipment; however, English styles are also seen, depending on the breed of horse. In some breed and open competitions, both English and Western handlers may appear in the same class. The biggest difference between Western Showmanship and English Showmanship is the outfit of the handlers. In Western showmanship you are required to wear a Western hat, Western boots, button up/collared shirt, and long pants. In English showmanship, you are required to wear the same outfit you would wear for an English riding class. This consists of breeches, English boots, an English helmet, an English coat with an English shirt underneath, and gloves (optional). Spurs are not allowed to be warn in either Western or English showmanship. The style of headstall in which the horse wears will also vary between English and Western Showmanship, as well as some of the grooming done to the horse. In English Showmanship, horses often have a braided mane, tail, and forelock. The same Showmanship pattern can usually be used for both English or Western Showmanship.

== Preparation ==
The horse must be appropriately groomed and clipped, as the exhibitor is being judged on the ability to fit and show a horse "in hand."

The horse is prepared months ahead of the event by being provided good nutrition to develop a healthy, shiny coat. Its hooves will be trimmed regularly by a farrier and kept balanced, smooth and neat. It will be brushed and otherwise groomed frequently to further promote a shiny coat and good overall health. The horse will also be exercised regularly, either in-hand or under saddle, to develop good muscle tone.

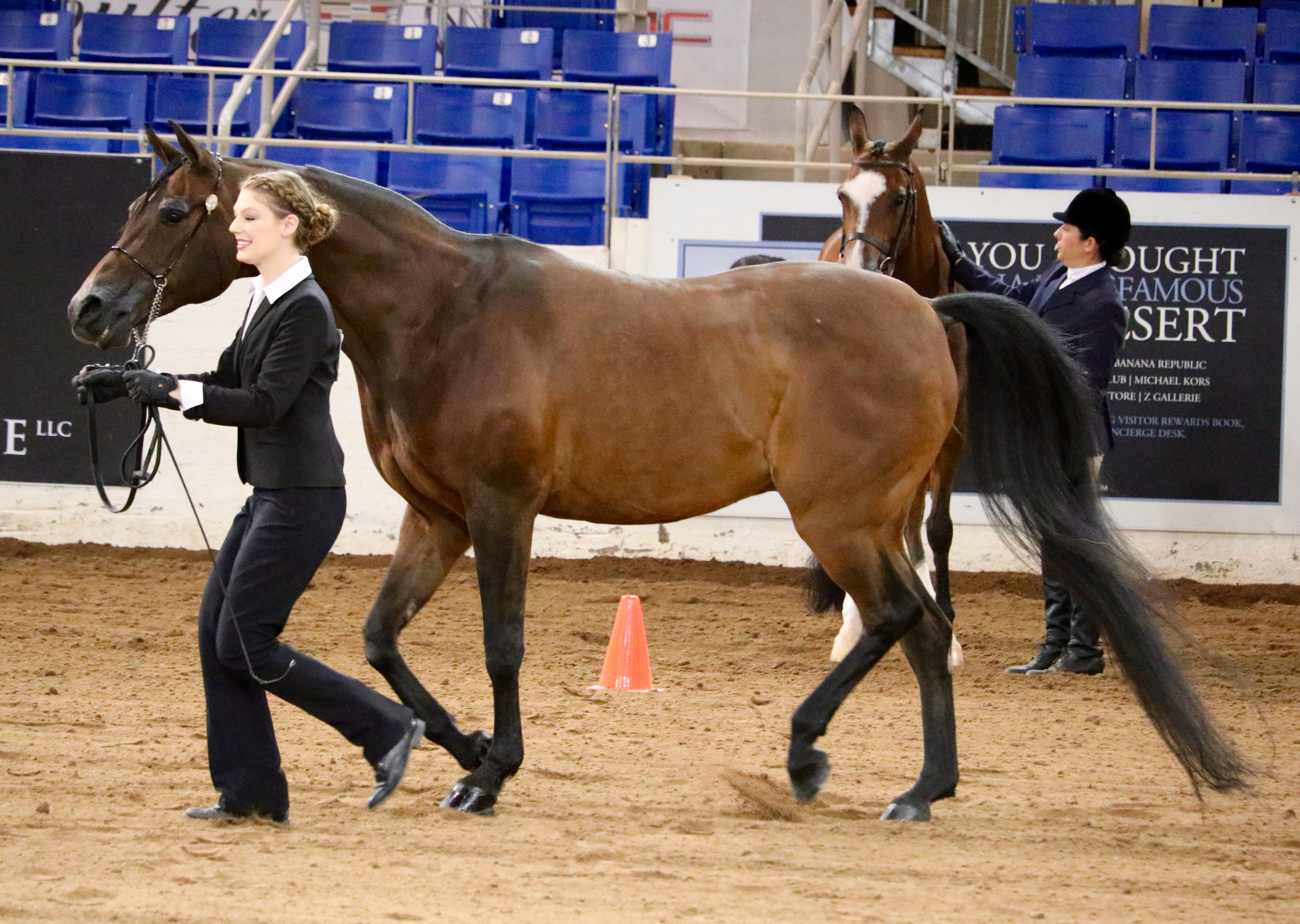
The Arabian horse can be shown with a full mane and tail

Before the show, usually within 12–24 hours of the class, the horse will be bathed and hair on its mane, tail, legs and head trimmed or clipped to meet the style standard for the particular breed of horse. Often special conditioners are used on the hair to make it extra shiny or silky. While precise styles vary by breed, the hair on the horse's lower legs, jaw, ears, and throatlatch usually is closely clipped, in North America, it is common to trim the whiskers on the muzzle and sometimes the eyes. Usually a "bridle path" is cut, depending on breed, removing a length of mane behind the ears where the crownpiece of the halter or bridle goes.

Competitors need to be familiar with class rules, grooming and style details for the breed of horse and style of tack and clothing they choose to use in the ring. A style preferred for a particular breed or style, such as braiding, may be considered illegal by another. Depending on the breed of the horse and the style of tack used, the mane might be braided, left loose, or "banded" (having small rubber bands put around small sections of a short mane at the roots in order to help it lay down). Horses shown with loose, flowing manes sometimes have their manes put into 5 or 6 large braids the night before, taken out just before the class and brushed to give an attractive, wavy appearance.

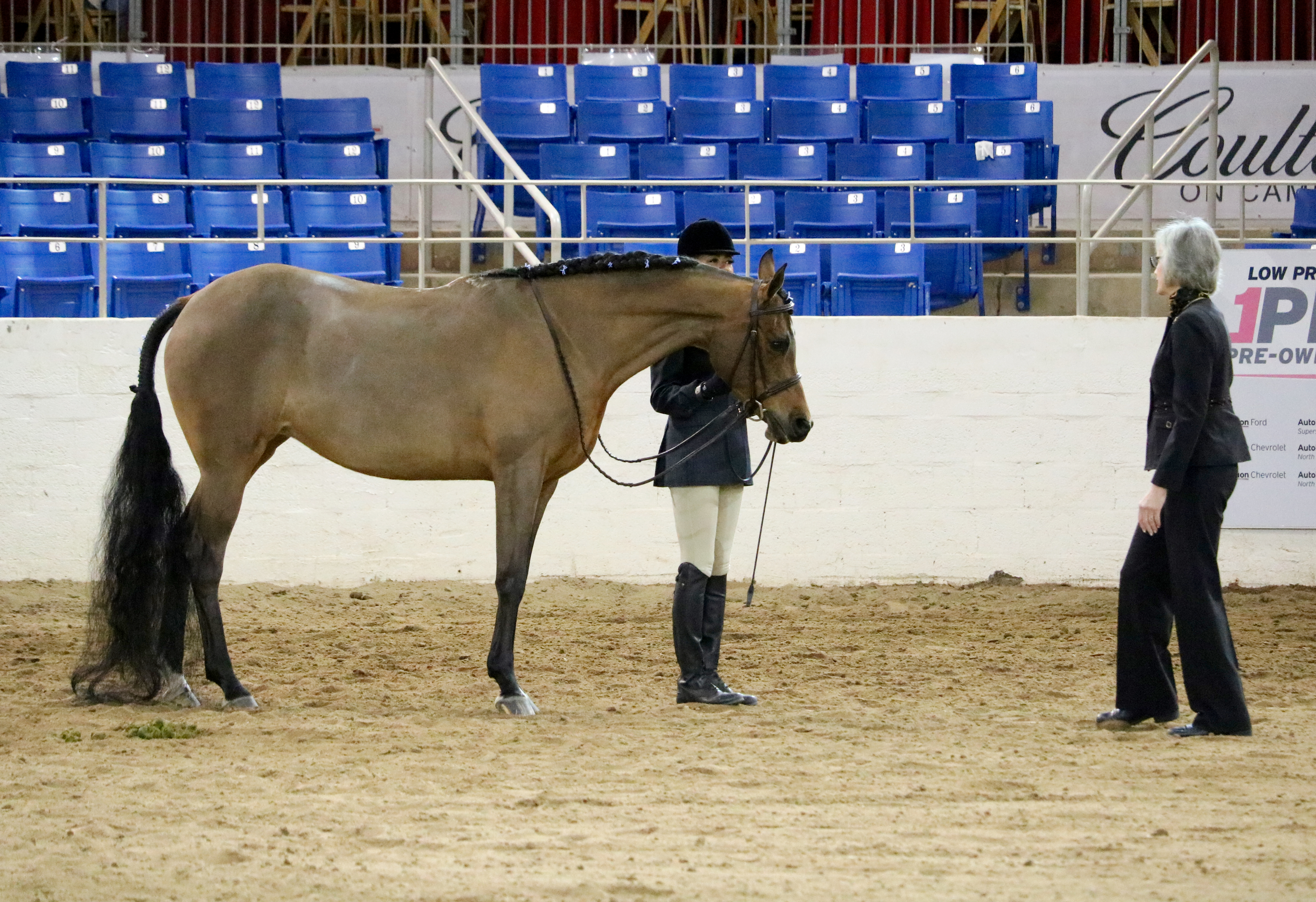
A show hunter is shown with a braided mane and tail

Tails of horses shown in hunt seat style may be French braided at the dock in classic show hunter style. Some breeds allow false hairpieces to be added to a tail, other breeds prohibit fake tails. Horses required to have naturally long tails sometimes have them kept "up" when not showing, the long hairs braided up to the bottom of the dock, then the braid rolled up, with a bandage or old sock put around the hair to keep it from breaking off and to keep the tail clean. When taken down and brushed out, a tail kept in this manner is wavy and flowing in the ring. If kept up at all other times, a tail may grow so long that it drags on the ground.

On the day of the show, shortly before it goes into the ring, the horse is not only groomed to remove every possible speck of dirt, but it will usually have polish applied to its hooves, a light oil or conditioner placed on its muzzle, around the eyes, and other strategic areas of the head to accent its best features, and usually have a light coat dressing sprayed on its entire body for a bit of last minute shine. While exhibitors in 4-H competition are expected to do this all themselves (and keep their show clothes clean in the process), exhibitors in open competition usually have a groom, often a parent or coach, assist them in this last-minute preparation.

== Training the showmanship horse ==
The horse must be trained to respond instantly to any command by the handler. It must lead off promptly at a walk or trot, and stop immediately when asked. It must back up straight and quietly and learn to turn in a very tight circle from a walk and trot. The horse is also taught to "set up" -- to place its feet in a position, usually square on all four legs, that best shows the conformation of its breed. Often the horse also needs to learn to hold its head and neck up in a certain flattering position as well. The horse has to learn to accept standing in the setup position for long periods of time without fidgeting or falling asleep, as showmanship classes often are very long, due to the fact that exhibitors work the pattern one at a time.

== Equipment and clothing ==
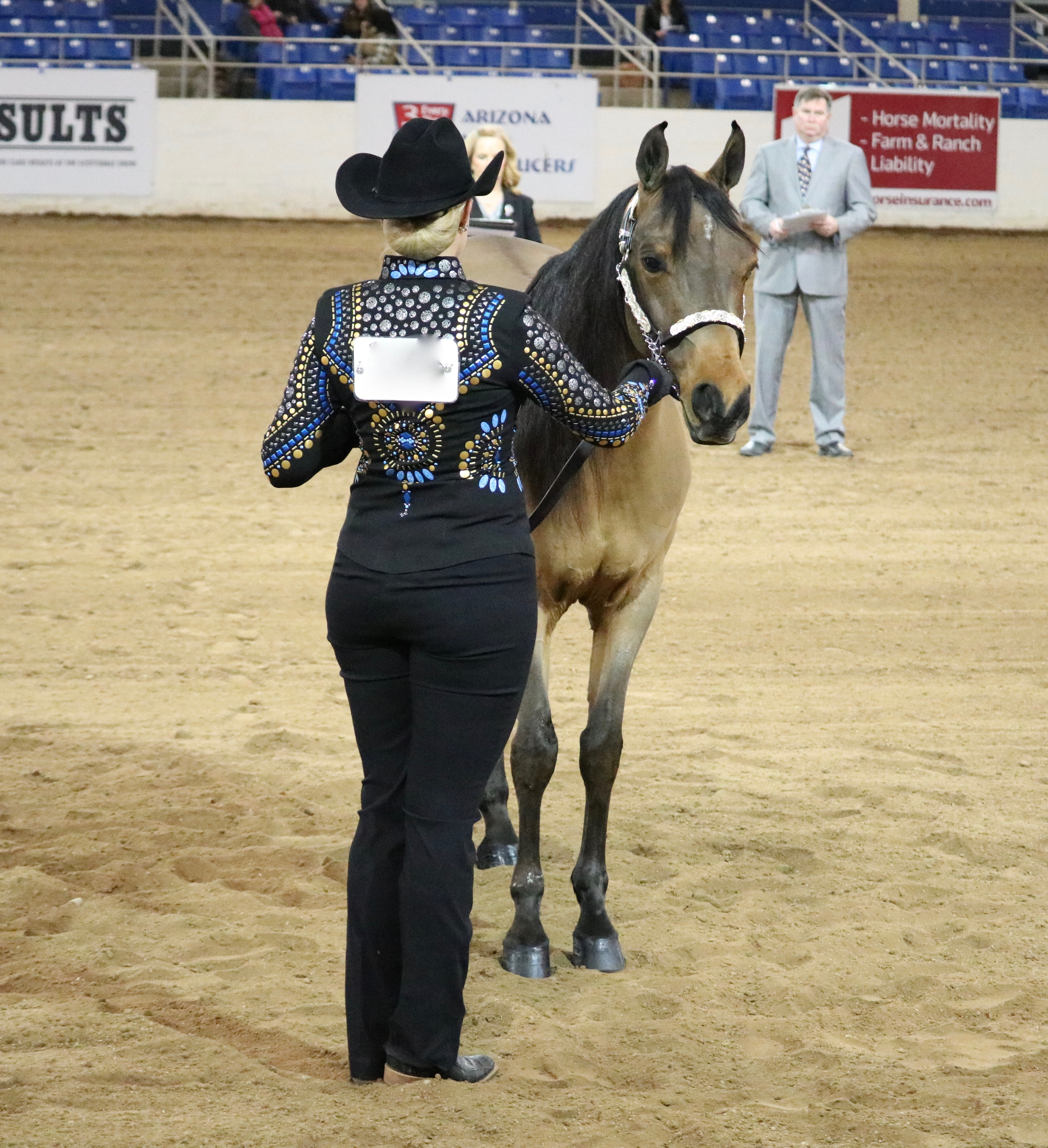
Western-style presentation

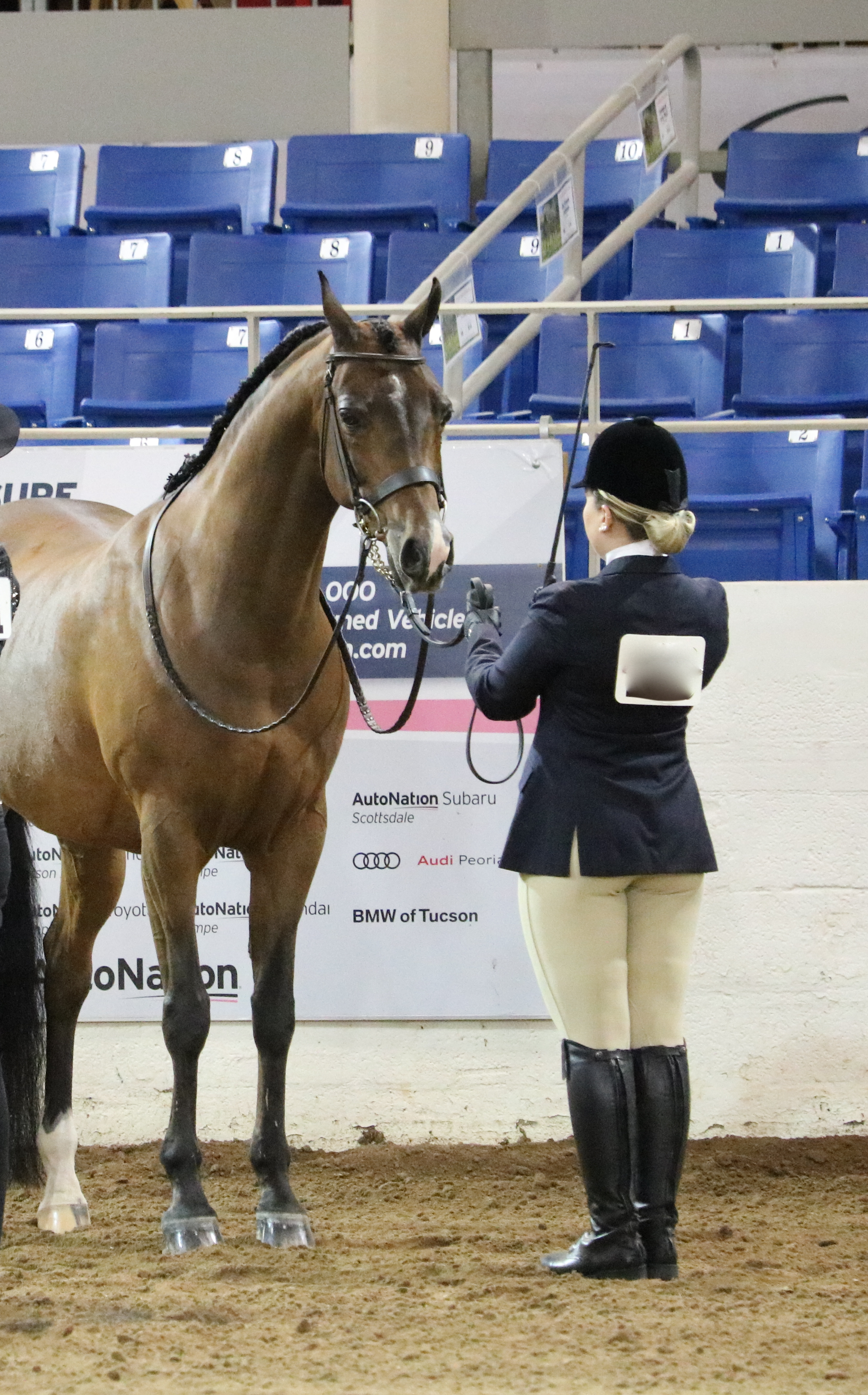
Hunt seat-style presentation

Cleanliness and a professional, polished look to horse and exhibitor is crucial. The team must next conform to the standard style for showing the given breed of the horse. If a horse can be shown under saddle in either English or Western equipment, the handler may choose their style of equipment, but it cannot be mixed between the two styles.

The horse shown western style is required to wear a halter and be handled with a lead shank. This is usually a well-fitted leather halter with a slim leather lead shank. The width of the leather straps of the halter may be quite heavy or very refined, depending on the breed of the horse and what looks best on an individual animal. Some show rules allow a chain under the jaw of the horse to provide extra control, other times it is not. The handler may carry a whip when showing some breeds, but usually whips are not allowed.

The horse shown hunter style wears a proper English style bridle, with the handler either leading the horse by the reins or with a lead shank attached to the bit. The horse shown saddle seat style may, depending on breed, be shown either in a modified form of the bridle used in riding classes or in an extremely thin, refined leather or leatherlike halter.

The exhibitor, male or female, must wear pants, a shirt with a tie or brooch, and boots. Some show rules require a hat. Gloves are optional, but usually worn by winning exhibitors because they provide a better grip on the lead shank and give a polished look. Jackets or vests are also optional, but common. If the handler is showing English style, they wear the same jodhpurs or breeches and boots as they would wear in a riding class, with appropriate hunt seat or saddle seat hats, neckwear, and jackets. In a few breeds, showmanship exhibitors, both male and female, may instead choose to wear a business suit similar to what might be worn to an office or other white collar work setting. Western handlers may wear either western riding clothing or a business-style outfit, augmented by a cowboy hat and boots

This event has evolved over time. In years past, it was a common to see exhibitors clad simply in neatly starched denim jeans, a pressed white shirt, necktie, hat and boots. The horse was originally shown in a simple leather stable halter. While simple clothing and equipment is still mandated at some levels of 4-H competition, in open competition and sanctioned events for various breeds, exhibitors usually follow the same style as seen in riding classes. Thus, it is common today to see Western-style exhibitors in very elaborate, appliqued ensembles bejeweled in swarovski crystals, showing horses in halters decorated with extensive amounts of sterling silver.

== Exhibition ==
The rules for showmanship classes are set by organizations such as 4-H, the United States Equestrian Federation and the American Quarter Horse Association. While rules vary a bit from one breed or organization to another, there are general principles that usually apply in all competitions.

The pattern the exhibitors are to perform is usually posted ahead of time. It must be memorized and riders cannot carry notes or be coached while in the ring. Horses are usually led into the ring at a walk. Depending on the breed and the pattern, exhibitors may enter and perform the required pattern one at a time, then line up in a group on one side of the ring, other times they may all enter the ring, line up first, then work the pattern.

Most patterns are deceptively simple: The exhibitor will lead the horse at a walk and trot, make one or two turns, stop at specific locations, and sometimes back up. However, all straight lines must be perfectly straight, all turns smooth and crisp, all changes of speed executed promptly. Orange highway cones are often used to designate the precise spot a horse and exhibitor are to walk, trot, turn or back. Patterns may be made more difficult by having changes of gait in shorter distances, by requiring more frequent or tighter turns, or by asking the horse to turn in place, pivoting on its hindquarters for two or three revolutions.

An exhibitor is not allowed to touch with the horse during a class. An exhibitor should treat each part of the pattern as a separate task leaving the maneuvers crisp, as opposed to sloppy and run together. An exhibitor should appear confident and happy; ultimately selling themselves and their horse to the judge by acting in a confident and professional manner.

Finally, the exhibitor has to set up the horse and the judge will walk around the animal, as if it were being judged for conformation. However, the judge is actually watching the exhibitor and evaluating the grooming, cleanliness, style and turnout of the entry. The exhibitor must move from one side of the horse to the other so that they do not interfere with the judge's line of sight, yet the horse must stand perfectly still, alert, with its ears pricked forward even when the exhibitor moves around. The handler must be particularly smooth and quiet when moving from one side of the horse to the other, yet move quickly and watch the judge at all times.

There are two standard styles used by exhibitors to stay out of the judge's way: the "half system" and the "quarter system." The half system is the simplest, used by beginning exhibitors at small shows, though technically legal even for most handlers. In the half system, the handler simply remains on the side (the "half") of the horse opposite that of the judge; when the judge is looking at the left side of the horse, the handler stands on the right, and vice versa.

The quarter system is a bit more complex but also more common. In the quarter system, the handler stands on the side opposite the judge when the judge is looking at the front of the horse, but when the judge moves to look at the hindquarters of the horse, the handler then moves to stand on the same side of the horse as the judge. The reasoning behind this method is that it is a bit safer in case the horse is startled by the judge being behind it, and it is also easier for the exhibitor to see the judge. Though technically a handler would be judged equally for using the half system or the quarter system, an exhibitor using the quarter system correctly will gain more points because it is a bit more complex.

Judges may ask exhibitors to pick up the feet of the horse, or to part the horse's lips and show the judge the "bite" of the horse's teeth. At some shows the judge may ask the exhibitor questions about the parts of the horse, horse management, the age and breed of their animal, and so on. The exhibitor is expected to provide a correct answer in a polite, confident and professional manner.

The winner of a showmanship class is usually determined by a formula that varies by the organization that sanctions the show, but usually counts grooming and cleanliness for about 40% of the score, and the pattern and handler's showmanship for about 60%.

== See also ==
- Halter (horse show)
- Horse grooming
- Horse care
- Equine nutrition
- Western riding
- Equestrianism
- List of horse breeds
- Mane (horse) for information on braiding
