= United States Equestrian Federation =

Organization and national governing body for many equestrian sports in the US

- Abbreviation: US Equestrian
- Formation: January 20, 1917; 109 years ago
- Headquarters: Lexington, Kentucky, U.S.
- Region served: United States
- Members: 200,000
- President: Tom O'Mara
- Website: usef.org

The United States Equestrian Federation (USEF or US Equestrian) is the national governing body for most equestrian sports in the United States. It began on January 20, 1917, as the Association of American Horse Shows, later changed to the American Horse Shows Association (AHSA). In 2001, the organization changed its name to USA Equestrian (USAE) and, in 2003 it merged with the United States Equestrian Team (USET). In 2017, USEF rebranded as US Equestrian. In 2019, USEF moved its laboratory services to the University of Kentucky.

Competitions governed by US Equestrian include dressage, driving, endurance riding, eventing, hunt seat equitation, hunter, jumper, para-equestrian, reining, roadster, saddle seat equitation, vaulting, and western riding competition including equitation, western pleasure, reining, trail, western dressage, and related events.

The organization also governs breed shows held in the United States for the Andalusian, Lusitano, Arabian, Half-Arabian/Anglo-Arabian, Connemara, Friesian, Hackney, Morgan, American Saddlebred, National Show Horse, Paso Fino, Shetland, and Welsh breeds.

US Equestrian keeps track of yearly points accumulated at individual horse shows throughout the year and gives awards based on these points at the end of the year. Horse shows governed under the USEF are given an AA, A, B, or C rating. Shows with an AA rating are the most prestigious and often offer the most prize money, whereas shows with a C rating are more local, usually awarding less prize money. Competitions recognized by the USEF must follow its rules and bylaws.

Governing bodies working under the USEF include:

- United States Hunter/Jumper Association (USHJA)
- United States Dressage Federation (USDF)
- United States Eventing Association (USEA)

US Equestrian Athlete Lettering Program started by the United States Equestrian Foundation offers opportunities for junior-high and high-school equestrian athletes to receive a varsity letter, just like any other varsity high-school athlete. The Program allows young equestrian athletes to be honored and recognized for their hard work and dedication to the equestrian sport.

== Board of directors ==
- President: Tom O'Mara
- CEO: William Moroney
- General Counsel: Sonja Keating
- External audit committees: Judith Werner, Thomas Brennan, Lisa Gorretta, Elisabeth Goth, Cindy Mugnier

== History ==
On January 20, 1917, representatives of some fifty horse shows met in Manhattan under the leadership of Reginald C. Vanderbilt. Their intention was to unite in order to assure clean competition in the show ring. They formed the Association of American Horse Shows, which by its first annual meeting on January 29, 1918, included the organizers of 26 well-known horse shows. The association incorporated in June 1918. Membership grew to list 35 member shows in 1919, and 67 shows by 1924. By the time of Vanderbilt's death in 1925, the organization had enrolled almost 70 shows as members of the organization.

Alfred B. Maclay was the next individual elected president. Early in his term, in 1927, the association printed its first set of rules, consisting of a six-page pamphlet. The rules were revised continually and have been added to throughout the history of the association. When Maclay's term ended in 1936, membership included 183 shows.

Maclay was followed by Pierre Lorillard as president. He served a year before Adrian Van Sinderen was elected. Under Van Sinderen, the office was relocated to 90 Broad Street in Manhattan. By the end of Van Sinderen's tenure in 1960, the rule book had grown to one hundred and sixty-eight pages.

The need for show stewards, representatives of the association to be present at and report on recognized shows, was recognized in the minutes of a 1930 executive committee meeting. It was not until the 1948 rule book that stewards were written in, however, and not until the 1960 rule book that licensing of stewards was in place and recognized in the rules.

In February 1933, the original name, the Association of American Horse Shows, Inc., was changed to the American Horse Shows Association, Inc. At the same meeting, individual members were recognized in addition to show members.

In 1935, a committee reported on their investigation of the transfer of control of the United States' membership in the International Equestrian Federation (FEI) membership from the United States Cavalry Association to the AHSA. The transfer of membership took place after the 1936 Summer Olympics, and after that, in the United States, the FEI rules applied only to international military classes. By this time, AHSA membership had grown to include 183 members and shows.

By 1937, the new rule book reflected the growth of the association by dividing the United States into five zones, each with a vice president and a five-member regional committee.

In 1939, the association began publication of the monthly magazine, Horse Show, with an initial circulation of 1,200 copies. By this time there were 187 recognized shows, and 800 individual members.

In 1960, the association began sending licensed stewards to each affiliated show to report and verify that the show was following the association's rules.

In 1999, the association moved from its Manhattan office to the Kentucky Horse Park in Lexington, Kentucky.

In 2001, AHSA changed its name to USA Equestrian (USAE) to represent the organization's role more effectively in the United States. At that time, the organization had over 80,000 individual members. There were more than 2,700 member competitions, 100 affiliate organizations, and 26 breeds and disciplines were recognized.

In 2003, USA Equestrian and the United States Equestrian Team (USET) joined together to take on responsibilities as a national governing body and became the United States Equestrian Federation.

In 2017, USEF rebranded to US Equestrian under the new President, Murray Kessler, launching the new campaign "Discover the Joy of Horse Sports."

In 2019, USEF moved its laboratory services to the University of Kentucky premises.
