= Romal =

Reins for Western horse riding

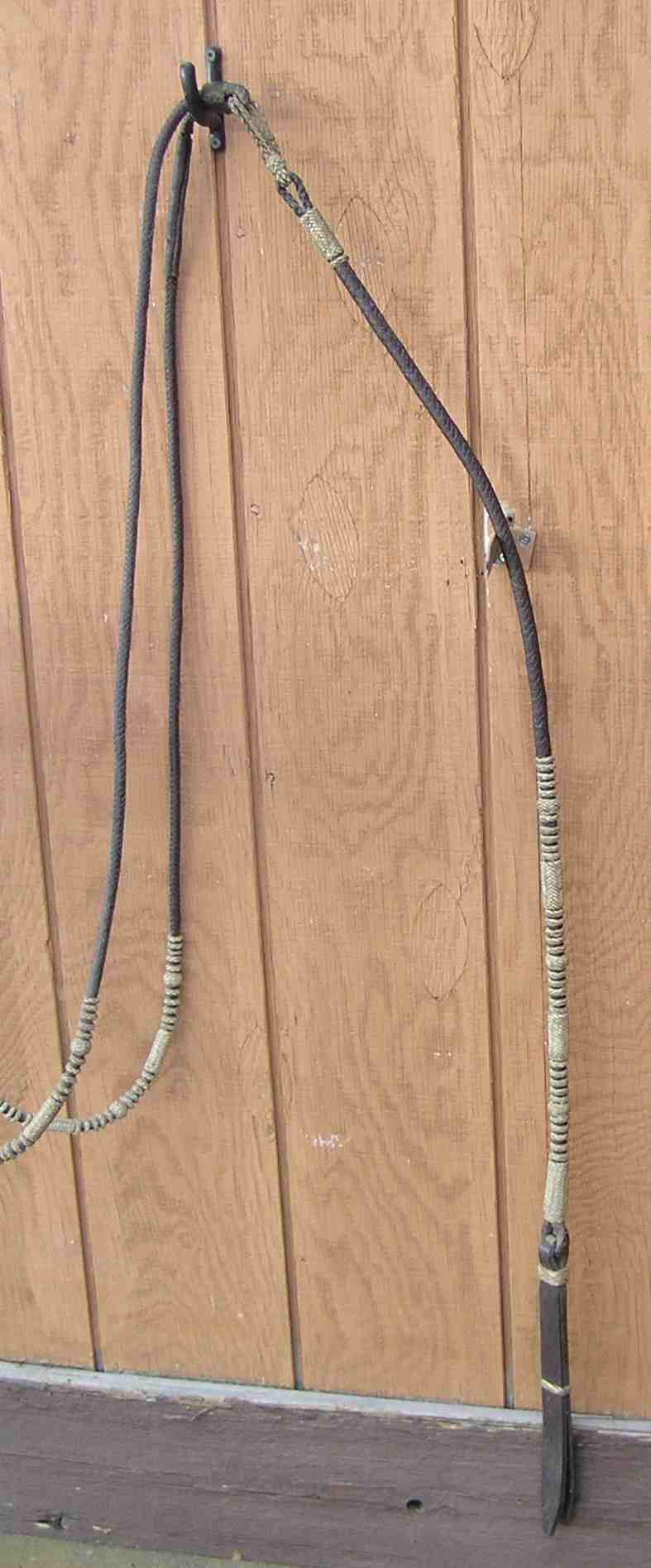
A set of reins with romal

A Romal (pronounced ro-MAHL) is a type of long quirt attached to the end of a set of closed reins that are connected to the bridle of a horse. It is not to be used to strike a horse, but rather was a tool used to assist in moving cattle.

A romal is usually made of leather or rawhide, is about four to five feet long, flexible and somewhat heavy, to prevent excess swinging and to aid control.

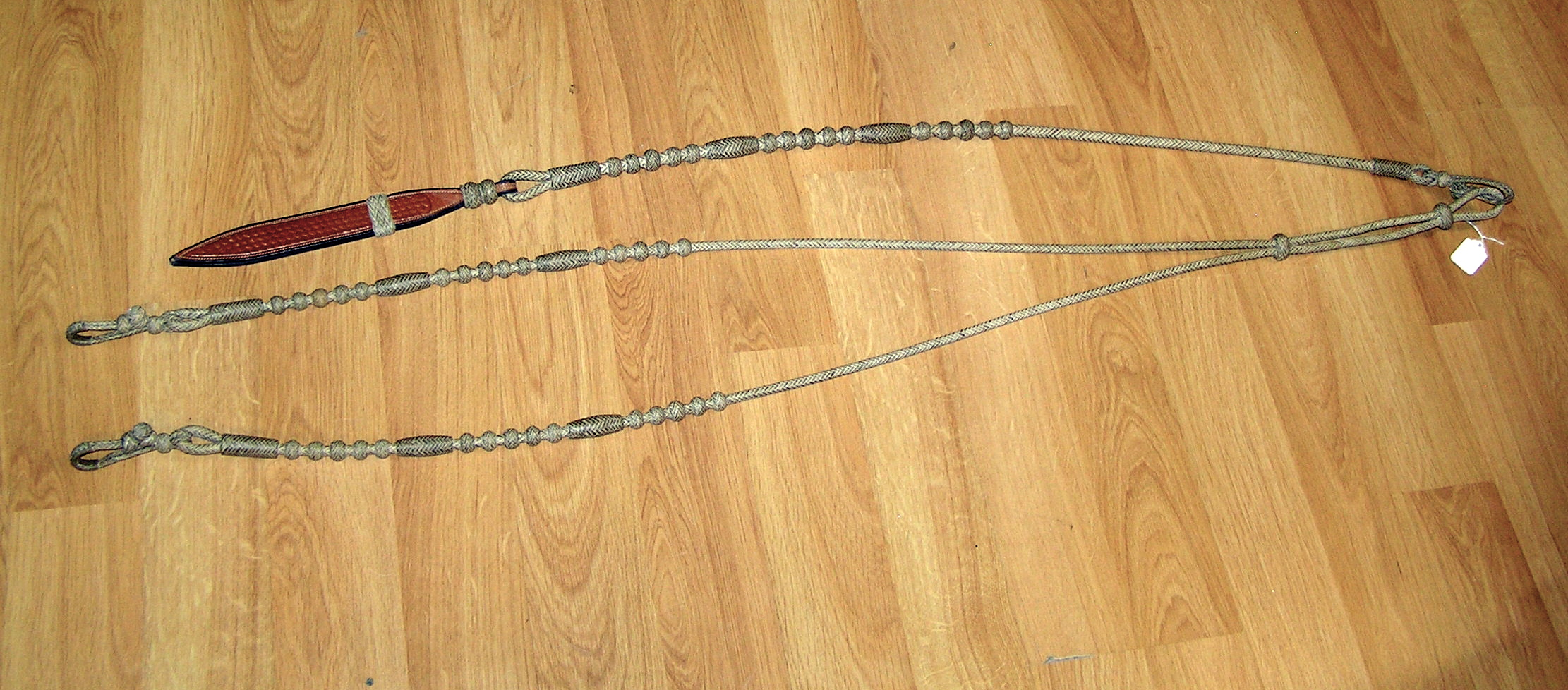
Rawhide romal rein set, from Mexico

It is historically associated with the vaquero tradition of western riding, and today is most often seen in western pleasure and equitation classes at horse shows for certain horse breeds that are shown in the "California style" of western riding, or in other western events in regions of the United States and Canada that are most influenced by the vaquero style.

== See also ==
- Vaquero
- Western riding
- Rein
- Bridle
