= Quirt =

Whip with a braided leather lash

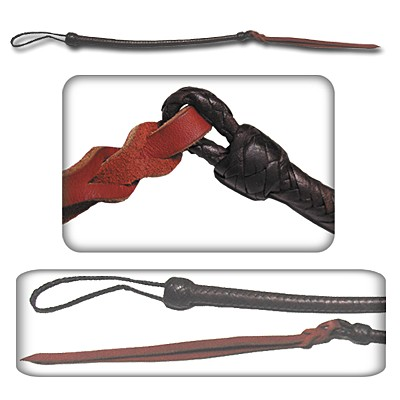

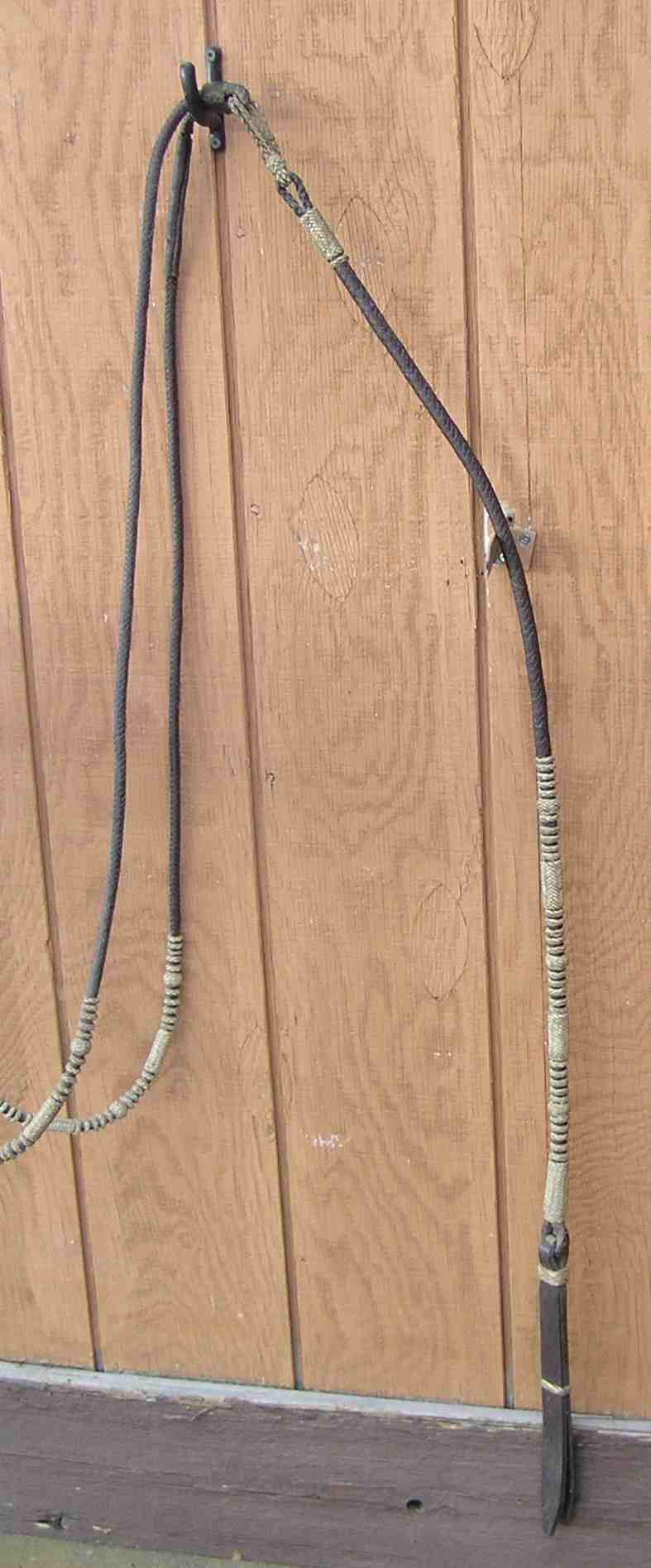
A quirt is attached to the end of a set of romal reins

A quirt is a short whip associated with the Southwestern United States. It often has a braided leather lash.

The falls on a quirt is made of leather, usually cowhide. The core of the quirt can be a leather bag filled with lead shot; the main part including the handle is often made from braided rawhide, leather, or kangaroo hide and is usually somewhat stiff but flexible.

The old-style horse quirt is still carried by some Western horsemen, and this style of quirt is seen in the early Western cowboy films.

The quirt, due to its slow action, is not particularly effective as a riding aid for horses, though at times it has been used as a tool of punishment. Rather, it is an effective tool to slap or goad cattle from horseback.

Cuerta, or quirt, used by vaqueros

In the vaquero tradition, a quirt with a long handle, known as a romal, was attached to the end of a closed set of reins. In Spanish, it is called a cuerta. The romal was primarily used as a noisemaker to slap or goad cattle. (The handle made it too slow and of the wrong length for use on the horse.) This combination of romal and closed reins, today referred to as "romal reins" or "romal-style reins", is seen primarily in the horse show ring in certain types of Western pleasure classes.

A quirt is still commonly used by horse-riding herdsmen of Mongolia. They can be highly individualized. Most are braided rawhide attached to a carved wooden handle or to a handle made from a segment of a stout tree branch. Others are only braided rawhide, with a loop at one end that serves as the lanyard.

Quirts were also used by some staff at residential schools to punish students. The severity of such beatings included broken skin on the bodies of First Nations children.

== In culture ==
The Quirt is the title of a 1920 novel by B. M. Bower.

Quirt Evans is the name of John Wayne's character in the 1947 film Angel and the Badman.

The protagonist of Cormac McCarthy's Blood Meridian is whipped with a quirt when imprisoned in Mexico.

Newt, a young cowboy in Larry McMurty's novel Lonesome Dove, is whipped with a quirt by a U.S. Army Soldier named Dixon while visiting the town of Ogallala, Nebraska.

== See also ==
- Crop
- Whip
