= Trail (horse show) =

Competitive class in horse shows

Trail is a competitive class at horse shows where horses and riders in western-style attire and horse tack navigate a series of obstacles. Contestants ride the course one at a time. Originally designed to resemble situations a horse and rider might actually encounter when on a trail in a natural habitat, modern trail classes now tend to focus more heavily on agility and manners, with courses bearing very little resemblance to real-world natural trails.

A typical trail course requires horse and rider to open and pass through a small gate while mounted; walk across a fake bridge; cross over a set of rails or logs at a walk, trot or lope; back up, often with a turn while backing; sidepass, often over a rail or log; turn on the forehand or hindquarters within a confined area; and tolerate some type of "spooky" obstacle, such as having the rider put on a vinyl raincoat. The horse is asked to perform all three gaits in the process of completing the course.

Additional obstacles or tests may include walking over a plastic tarp or through water; having the horse ground-tie (remain standing in one spot while the rider walks away); to walk, trot or lope in very tight quarters, such as traveling through a series of cones or markers in a serpentine pattern; or take a small jump (usually under 18 inches, as riders are in western saddles and cannot easily get off the horse's back into a jumping position).

Sanctioned horse shows have extremely strict, uniform rules for types of obstacles allowed, distances and sizes used for agility obstacles, and rules for time allowed for each obstacle. Course designers often add both beauty and challenge to a course by adding potted shrubs, flowers, and brightly painting various obstacle elements.

Local shows not governed by the rules of a national organization may have simpler courses that do not require all three gaits, have fewer, simpler obstacles, or easier spacing. On the other hand, unsanctioned shows may also have far more imaginative courses than do larger competitions. Obstacles not allowed at most sanctioned shows but sometimes seen at the local level may include asking a horse to load in a strange trailer; asking the horse to pass quietly by animal hides (cow hides are common, but even bear skins may be seen) or asking the horse to pass by or even lead unusual live animals (everything from goats and mules to llamas). Often, the only limit is the course designer's imagination.

Another popular event that combines elements of a trail class with actual natural conditions is the judged trail ride, where riders travel a natural trail, usually of five to ten miles, and periodically come upon obstacles where the horse's manners and performance are judged.

== See also ==
- Western riding
- Trail course
- Trail riding
- Equestrianism
- Horse show
