= Halter (horse show) =

Type of horse show class where horses are shown in hand and not ridden

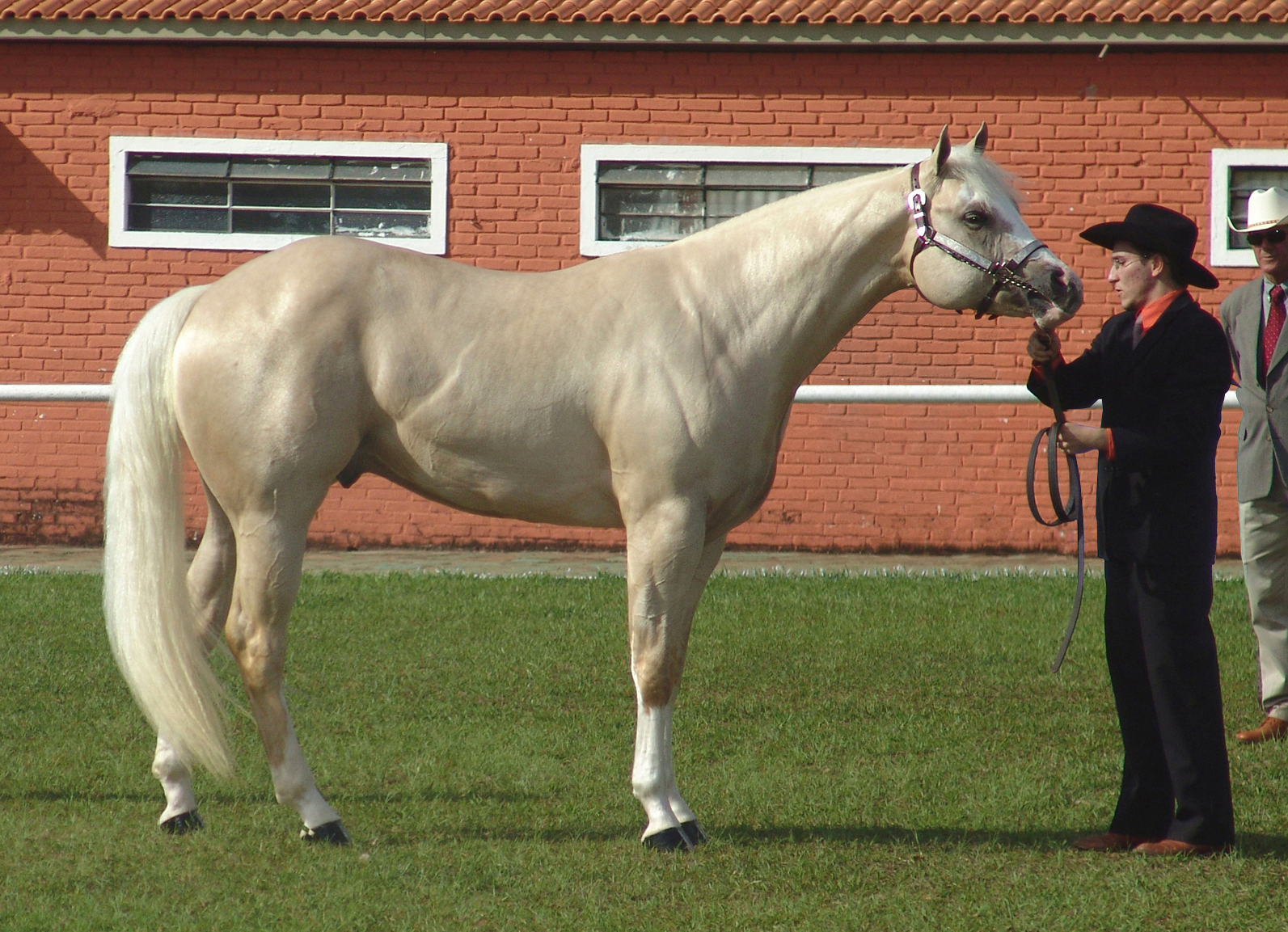
A stock-type horse being shown at halter

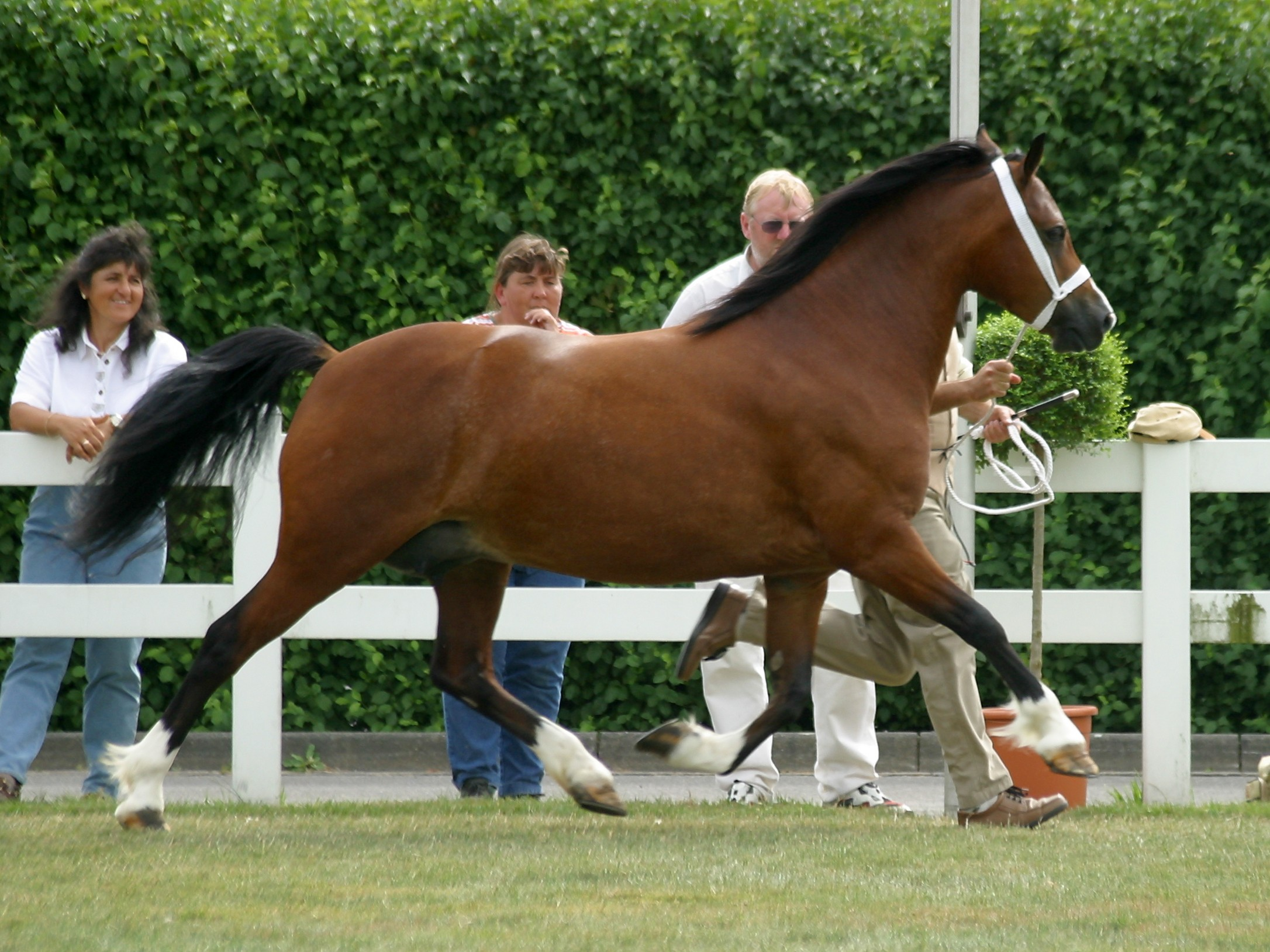
A Welsh pony shown in-hand in Europe

Halter is a type of horse show class where horses are shown "in hand," meaning that they are led, not ridden, and are judged on their conformation and suitability as breeding stock. Depending on breed and geographic region, such events may be called "Halter," "In-Hand," "Breeding," "Model," or "Conformation" classes.

An event that judges young people on their ability to groom and present a halter horse is called Halter Showmanship, Showmanship, or Showmanship In-Hand. In most breeds, the exhibitor is given a score that breaks down to be roughly 60% on showmanship or skill, 40% on grooming and preparation, though precise standards vary by breed and discipline.

Almost every horse breed has halter classes of some type. Halter classes are usually grouped by breed, sex, or age. Rules, breed standards, clipping patterns, grooming styles, use of grooming products and popularity of the halter discipline varies widely. However, all classes require that horses be meticulously groomed before entering the ring, be trained to stand correctly in the style dictated by their breed or discipline, and to walk and trot on command in a designated pattern or line. The breed of horse in the ring can sometimes be determined by grooming style and presentation alone.

== Presentation of halter horses in the United States ==
North American halter exhibitors in most breeds tend to be more fond of hoof polish, hair dressings, oils and "shine enhancers," silicone sprays and other grooming aids than their counterparts in the rest of the world. In the United States, fashion trends in grooming are often more noticeable than in Europe, where horses, while still very well groomed, are allowed a somewhat more "natural" style of preparation with less clipping and use of fewer grooming products.

Showing styles listed below are considered correct in the USA, but may differ in other countries.

== Sport horse disciplines ==
Sport horses, that is, animals of any breed who are intended to be used under saddle as show hunters, show jumpers, dressage horses, or even eventers, when shown in hand, are judged first and foremost on their potential athleticism, with soundness and quality of movement being very important. They have manes braided in a style appropriate for their discipline, and usually have their tails either braided or pulled. They are shown in a hunt seat style bridle (horses two and under may be shown in a leather halter). Other than cleanliness, braiding, and basic show trimming of legs, muzzle, ears and a short bridle path, grooming products are kept to a minimum and excessive oils and polishes are frowned upon.

The handler usually dresses neatly, but casually, often wearing a polo shirt and khaki pants, with running shoes. Correct hunt seat riding attire is also permissible. However, many people find running in field boots to be cumbersome, particularly when showing on the triangle (see below), so the more casual look prevails.

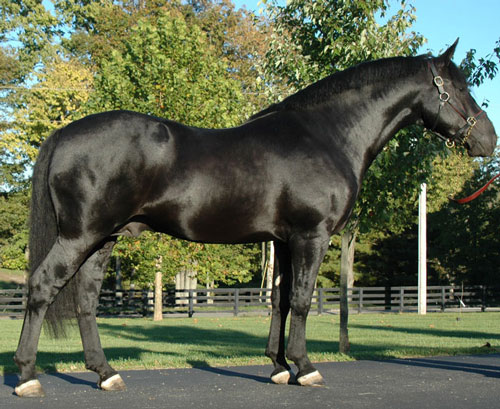
A horse in an "open" stance

The horse is stood up for judging in an "open" stance, in that the front and hind legs are not lined up squarely, but rather the two front legs and two hind legs are placed with one leg slightly in front of the other, so that all four legs can be seen simultaneously from the side. The head and neck are allowed to be held at a natural position, thought the handler may subtly raise or lower the head a bit to flatter the individual horse. Most sport horses now show on a "triangle" pattern, allowing a view of the horse going toward and away from they judge as well as a side view of the horse in motion. Horses are walked a small triangle pattern, then trotted on a larger triangle pattern before setting up for the judge to further assess them at a standstill.

Any breed may be shown in a sport horse style when appropriate, but the most common breeds shown in a sport horse style and no other include the Thoroughbred and all of the various Warmblood breeds. Due to the strong international influence on the under saddle events within the sport horse disciplines, there is less difference between the USA and Europe in this style of presentation than for other styles.

== Stock breeds ==
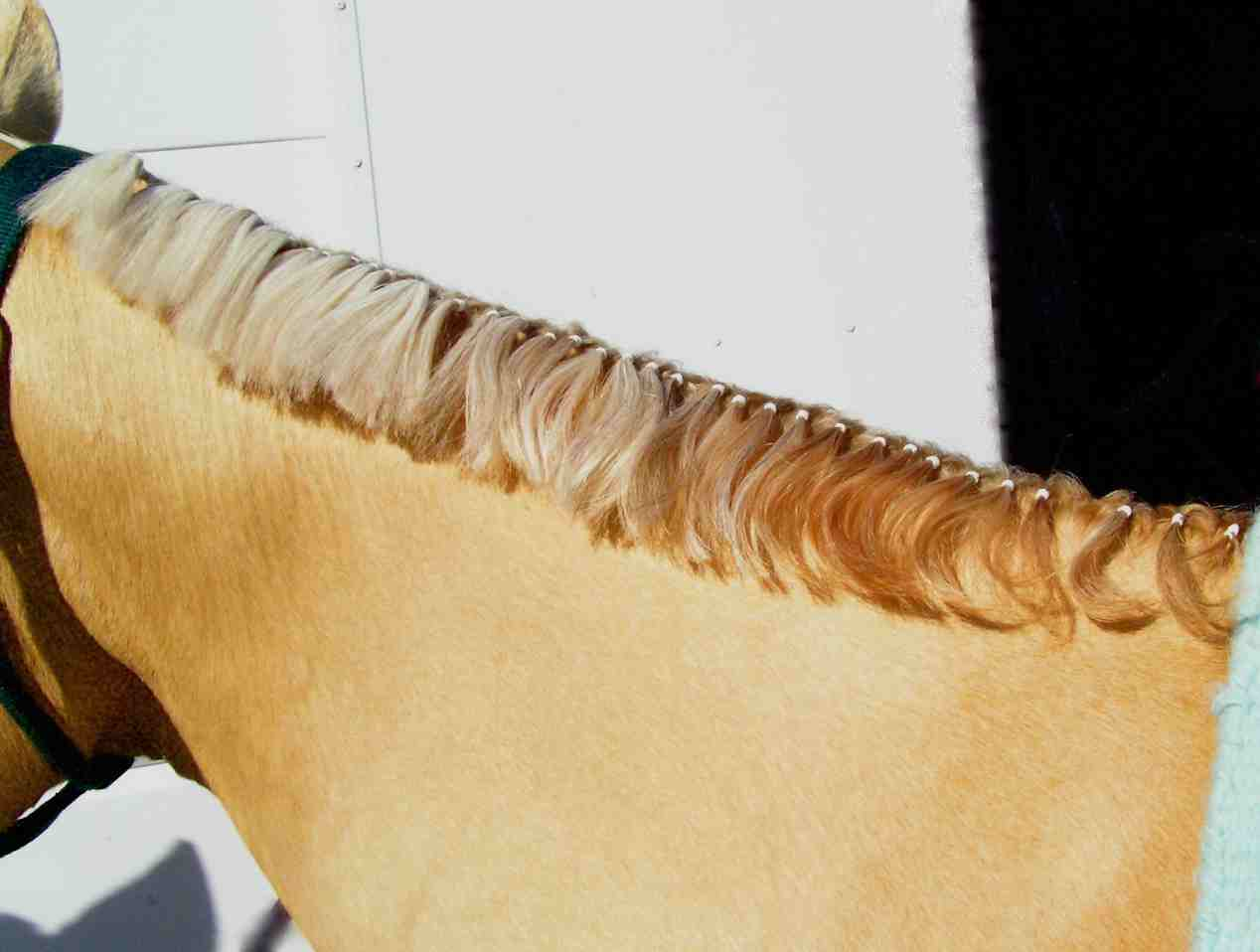
The banded mane of a stock type horse

The stock horse breeds in the United States put more emphasis on quality of conformation in the stand-up presentation, though movement is also scored. Stock breeds include the American Quarter Horse, Appaloosa, American Paint Horse and breeds of similar body type. In most classes, horses are required to walk and trot in a straight line, usually walking toward the judge and trotting away from the judge, then assessed individually from a standstill. The horse is to stand perfectly square on all four feet. The head is usually held at a natural angle that is flattering to the individual horse, not too high or too low.

Manes are shortened and pulled, then combed to lay flat, and often are "banded" with small rubber bands. Horses are given basic show clipping of ears, legs, muzzle and bridle path, polish is often used on hooves, and silicone-based sprays on the hair coat, but excess glitz and oil on the horse is frowned upon.

Most competitor wear Western style attire, usually including a jacket and a cowboy hat, and horses are presented in a flat leather halter, usually ornamented with silver.

== Action breeds and gaited breeds ==
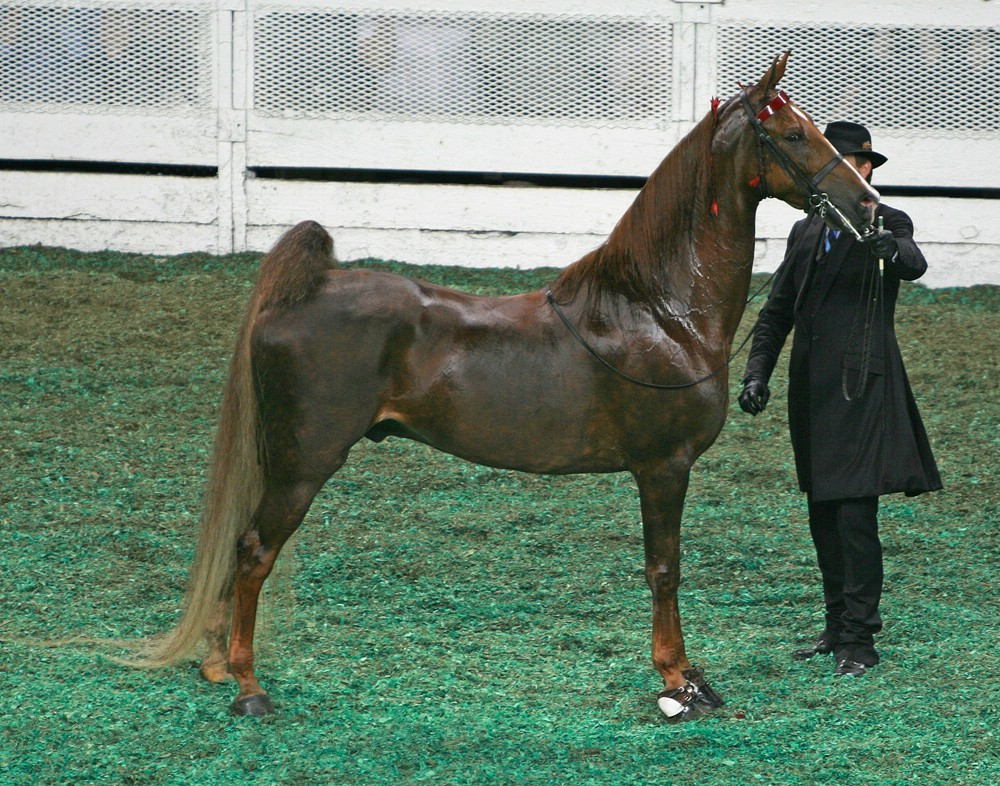
A five-gaited American Saddlebred "stripped" for conformation judging at the end of a performance class

Breeds best known for high trotting action and stylish appearance under saddle or in harness are shown at a trot along the rail as well as being asked to set up for judging in a position where the front feet are square and the hind feet square, but stretched out or "parked" a bit behind the normal, square position. Their head and neck is held high, with the head brought forward just enough to create a clean line at the throatlatch. They generally line up head to tail along the rail and are brought singly into the center of the ring for evaluation at a standstill, then are trotted away from the judge and down the rail so their action can also be viewed from the side. Conformation at a standstill is strongly considered, though the "parked out" stance also can hide a multitude of leg flaws, making the judge's observation of the horse in motion very important.

Horses are generally shown with the curb bit portion of a saddle seat style double bridle, or in a very thin, refined show halter, usually of black or patent leather with a colorful noseband (and, sometimes, browband). Usually the forelock and one or two sections of the mane has a brightly colored ribbon braided into it, and false tails are permitted. Clipping styles vary by breed and by discipline within some breeds, but proper clipping is an art form and far more extensive than for the sport horse or stock breeds. Action breeds are groomed extensively with silicone sprays on the coat, oils to add shine to the face, and hoof polish common.

Handlers usually wear either a variation on a business suit (basically a business suit that allows freedom to run, plus a full range or arm movement, does not show dirt and is easily cleaned, plus paddock boots or dark running shoes) or saddle seat riding attire, though usually without the long coat.

Breeds shown in this fashion include the American Saddlebred and Hackney. Morgans are also shown in a similar manner, but without ribbons, false tails, or any type of braiding. (Unless specifically shown as sport horses, then hunter braiding and presentation is permissible). Most ponies, including the Shetland pony, Welsh pony and Miniature horse are shown in the style of the action breeds, though a few may be shown in a stock horse style, particularly if a pony breed developed from stock horse bloodlines, such as the Pony of the Americas.

Many "Gaited" breeds, including the Tennessee Walker and the Missouri Foxtrotter are shown in a similar fashion, with their intermediate ambling gait, whatever it happens to be, substituted for the trot. Purity and form of gait is judged heavily and of great importance in gaited breeds.

== Arabians and related breeds ==
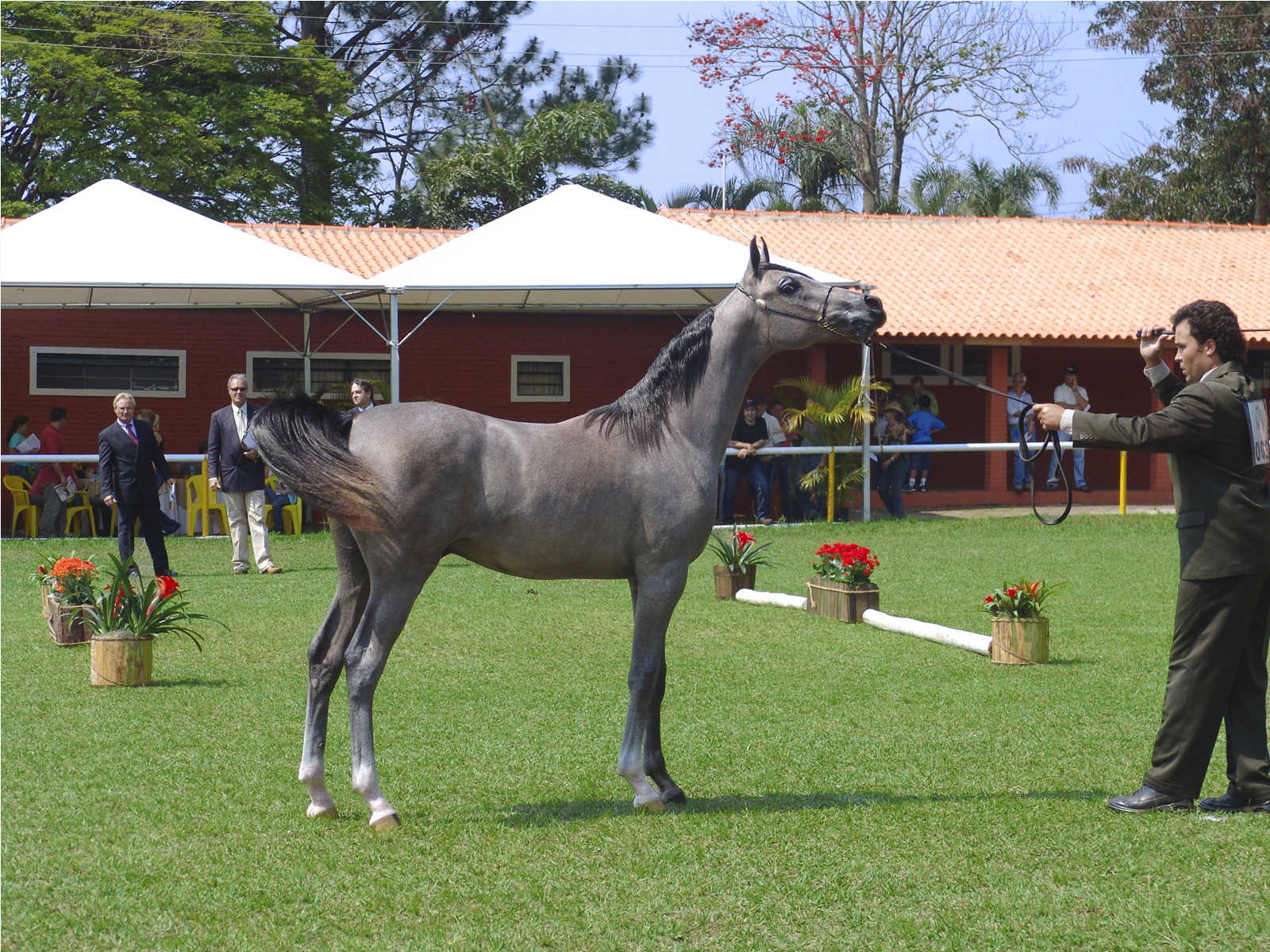
A young Arabian shown at halter

The Arabian horse and breeds directly derived from the Arabian, such as the Morab, Welara, and the National Show Horse, as well as part-Arabian pinto horses, do not have any braiding or banding that interferes with a naturally long, free-flowing mane and tail. (Unless specifically shown as sport horses, then hunter-style braiding and presentation is permissible).

Some miniature horses are also shown in the style of Arabians.

The conformation stance for the breed is to have the front feet square and the back feet parted so that one leg is set perpendicular to the ground, and the other slightly behind it, in order to tighten and flatten the relatively horizontal croup and show off the high-set tail that are breed characteristics. The head is carried high and the neck stretched out. Class procedure is similar to the action breeds, with somewhat greater emphasis on the stand-up for individual presentation.

They are presented in a very fine, thin show halter with minimal decoration, designed to show off the refined head that is a characteristic of the breed. Handlers usually wear similar attire to those showing action breeds, though some instead choose to wear Western-style attire. They are as extensively groomed as the action breeds, though manes and tails are never clipped or artificially enhanced, other than the clipping of a bridle path.

Judging of Arabian horses is in flux, with a new judging system set to go into effect in early 2008. Under the new system, breed type, movement, head, neck and shoulder, body and topline, and feet and legs will each be given a numerical score with all components equally weighted.

== See also ==
- Horse show
- Horse showmanship
- Horse grooming
- Mane (horse)
- Halter
- List of horse breeds
