= Western pleasure =

Competition at horse shows

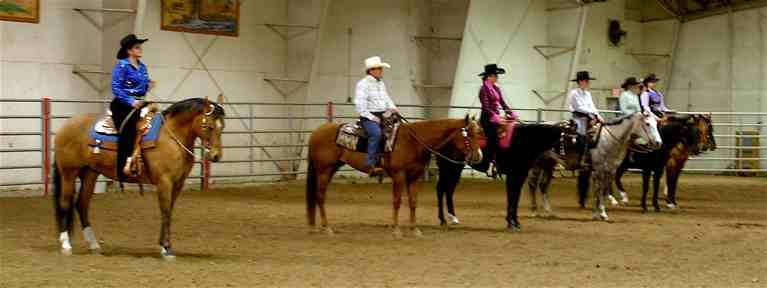
Horses lined up in a western pleasure class

Western pleasure is a western style competition at horse shows that evaluates horses on manners and suitability of the horse for a relaxed and slow but collected gait cadence, along with calm and responsive disposition. The horse is to appear to be a "pleasure" to ride, smooth-moving and very comfortable. Most light horse breeds in the United States and Canada may compete in western pleasure classes, either in open competition or at shows limited to a single breed. However, horse conformation and temperament play a role in this event, and hence animals of stock horse breeds that are calm, quiet, have collected, soft gaits and the strong muscling required to sustain slow, controlled movement are the most competitive.

== Breeds ==
Nearly any breed can be exhibited in western pleasure classes. The highest levels of competition are usually in shows restricted to a single breed, but at lower levels, there are open classes where multiple breeds may compete against one another. Regardless of breed, horses are generally expected to move in a slow, light, calm, and relaxed manner, with minimal rein contact. The desired "frame" or style of the horse may vary from breed to breed.

In open or all-breed competition, stock horse breeds such as the American Quarter Horse, American Paint Horse and Appaloosa tend to be favored by the judges, though quality individuals from other breeds such as the Morgan horse and Arabian horse can be competitive if not penalized for their natural conformation that gives them a somewhat higher-set neck. "Gaited" breeds such as the Missouri Fox Trotter and the Tennessee Walker often have their own Western Pleasure classes with standards adapted to evaluate their use of intermediate gaits other than the jog trot. Even breeds that are traditionally shown mostly in English riding disciplines, such as the American Saddlebred or the Friesian, may offer western pleasure classes with judging specifications that are adapted to the conformation and way of going of those breeds.

=== Stock breeds ===
Most stock horse breeds are shown with a style referred to as a "level top line." Their movement is described as "daisy cutting," as they have very little knee action, but their hindquarters are actively engaged and their hocks reach well under the body. They carry their neck nearly level with their withers, and head just slightly in front of vertical, but are to be penalized if their poll is carried lower than their withers. The head and neck move very little at any gait. They are exhibited with little to no bit contact and a loop in the rein. The style used to show these horses is derived from the "Texas" cowboy tradition.

=== Saddle type breeds ===
"Saddle type" horses encompass a large group of horse breeds of many sizes and body types that have an arched and high-set neck and naturally greater knee action. They are shown in a style derived from the "California" vaquero cowboy tradition, particularly that of the finished spade bit horse. They are to show with a lightly arched neck, their heads relatively low and tucked to be almost exactly perpendicular to the ground, with horses overflexed or going "behind the bit" to be penalized. Though a self-carried horse is desired, with minimal bit contact and a draped rein visible, this effect is often achieved by use of weighted reins, as by nature they are ridden with somewhat more contact and have more forward motion than the stock type.

Arabian and Morgan horse breeders produce horses specially bred for the western disciplines and offer western pleasure classes that draw large numbers of competitors. Breeds such as the American Saddlebred or Friesian have smaller numbers competing in western competition than other events, but classes are available. Most gaited horses fall into the saddle type category in terms of desired frame and style, though judging criteria for their gaits differs significantly from that of non-gaited breeds.

== Equipment ==
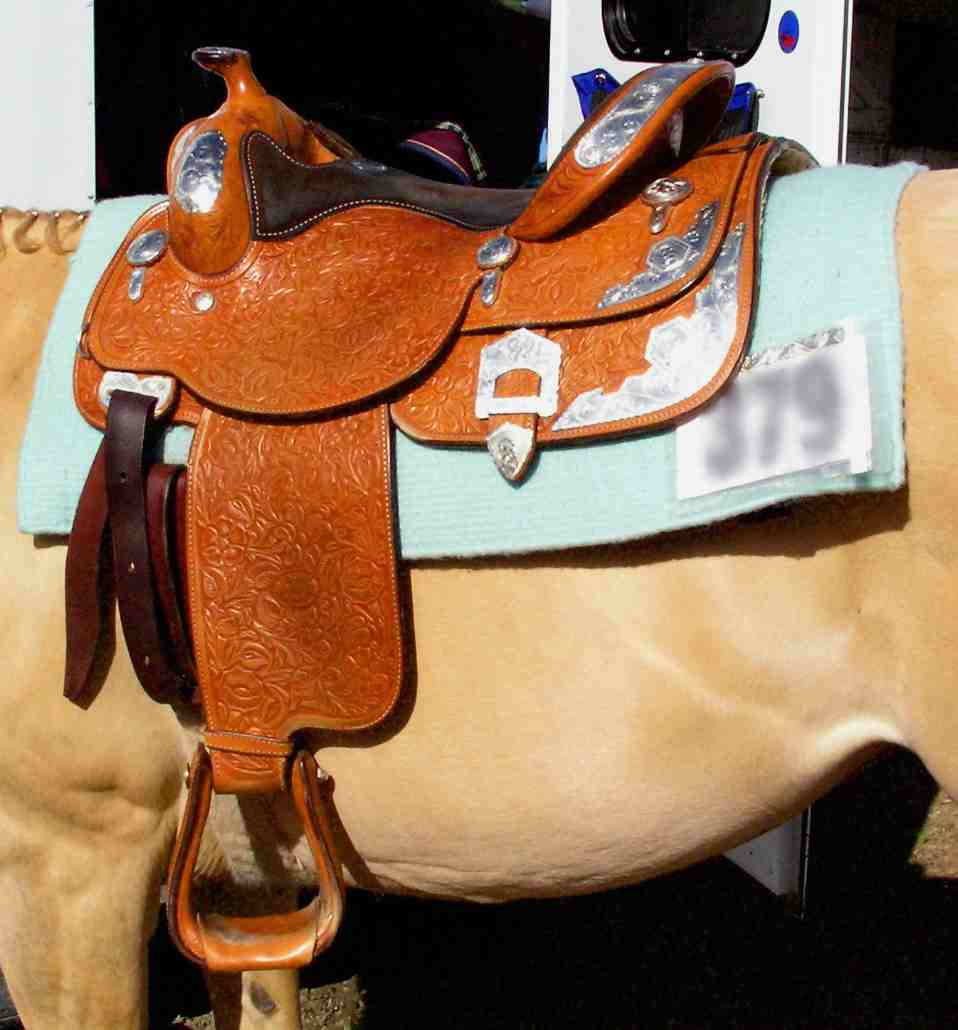
A western saddle suitable for show.

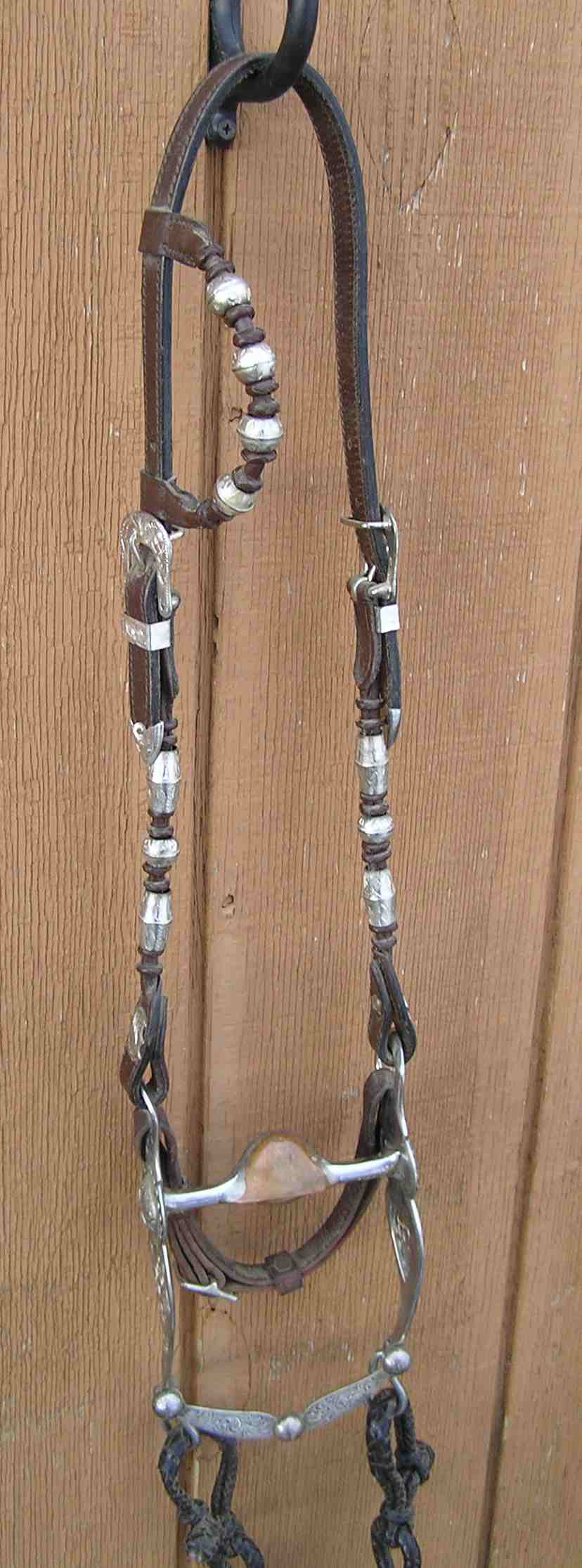
A western show bridle with silver ornamentation on headstall and bit.

Horses and riders show in western tack and attire. The horse carries a western saddle, and wears an open-faced bridle without a noseband. The rider wears a long-sleeved shirt, sometimes with a vest or jacket, chaps, a cowboy hat, and cowboy boots. Gloves and spurs are optional. Shirts and vests or jackets are often brightly colored and sometimes elaborately decorated to mimic popular styles in western wear. Riders at smaller shows usually wear denim jeans under their chaps, while at regional and national competitions, western-styled polyester dress pants that match the rider's shirt or chaps are worn by women, while men tend to stick to jeans. Men usually wear a neckscarf, often of silk, and women may too wear a neckscarf, but in recent years as rules have been relaxed, brooches and necklaces are now also seen on female riders.

== Show grooming ==
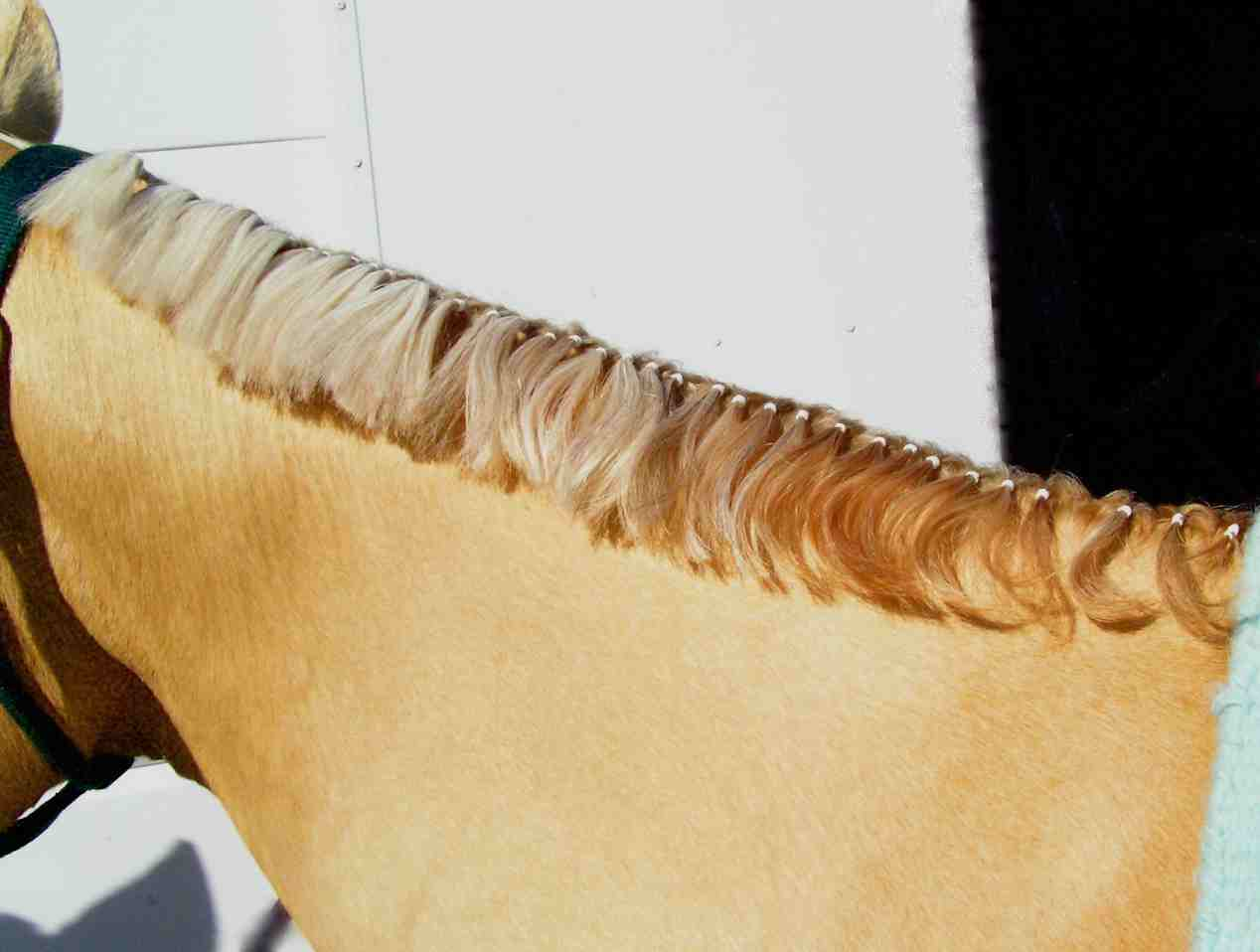
A mane that has been banded for western classes at a horse show

While all western pleasure horses are to be clean (generally bathed prior to a show) and well groomed, with legs, bridle path, ears, muzzle, and other areas neatly clipped, grooming details vary by breed. Length of bridle path is usually determined by breed, with longer-necked breeds usually sporting a longer bridle path than the stock horse breeds.

Casual observers will mostly notice breed differences in the style of the horse's mane. Though fads vary a bit from year to year, in the stock horse breeds, the mane is usually shortened and thinned, often "banded," in that the mane is divided into many small segments and small rubber bands are placed around each segment in order to make the overall mane lay flat and neat. However, in some years, long manes have been "in," and in other years a thinned mane with a braided forelock or a few small braids in the front of the mane has been popular. Arabians and Morgans are less prone to fads as they have long been required to show with "natural" long, unthinned, unbanded, unbraided manes. Gaited breeds and Saddlebreds usually sport the same mane style in both English pleasure and western pleasure classes, long and flowing but with a colorful ribbon braided into the forelock and into the front section of the mane.

Tails are usually kept relatively long and flowing for nearly all breeds. Artificial tails or tail extensions are often allowed, though are banned for Arabians and Morgans, where a full tail is a breed trait.

== Class procedure and requirements ==
The riders compete as a group at the same time, traveling around the outer edge of the arena. All contestants, at the command of the event's judge, are asked to have their horse walk, jog (a slow trot), and lope both directions in an arena, as well as to stand quietly and back up readily. In addition, many judges will ask for extended gaits, particularly an extended jog and, in some breeds, the hand gallop.

Winning horses are decided on their quality of movement, proper behavior, form in motion, and calm manner. As stated in the show rules of the American Quarter Horse Association (AQHA), "maximum credit should be given to the flowing, balanced and willing horse which gives the appearance of being fit and a pleasure to ride." The Western Division of the United States Equestrian Federation (USEF) has similar requirements. Faults are assessed on infractions such as excessive speed or slowness, breaking gait, or incorrect head position.

According to the American Paint Horse Association rule book, in judging western pleasure, credit is to be given to the horse that under light control and without intimidation goes forward with comfort, self-carriage, confidence, willingness, and a balanced, fluid stride. To evaluate these things a judge should look for these six characteristics: cadence and rhythm, top line and expression, consistency and length of stride, in that order. Cadence is defined as: The accuracy of a horse's footfalls at any given gait. Rhythm is defined as: The speed of those footfalls at any given gait. The Topline: The head and neck should be carried in a relaxed natural position, compatible with the horse's conformation. The head should not be carried behind the vertical, giving the appearance of intimidation or be excessively nosed out, giving a resistant appearance. Expression should have a pleasant look with clear, bright eyes and a willing attitude. Consistency is defined as the ability to maintain the same top line, cadence and rhythm in each gait throughout the class. Length of stride should be of a reasonable length in relation to that horse's conformation with a full extension of the limbs. The winner of any western pleasure class should be the horse that best combines these six characteristics. Cadence and rhythm should always be first and most important in evaluating a western pleasure horse.

The Western Pleasure rider's seat is deep, with a long stirrup, to assist the horse in driving deeply from the rear and elevating the shoulders. Reins are kept loose and relaxed, though quiet and subtle rein signals are still used. While equitation of the rider is not judged in a pleasure class, a properly positioned rider will obtain a better performance from the horse.

== Controversies ==
Western pleasure competition, like any event, has controversies and situations where fads become so extreme as to possibly constitute abuse. Therefore, most organizations that sanction horse shows have strict rules to prevent the worst problems. Nonetheless, it is hard to regulate fads, and horse show sanctioning organizations usually tout education of judges as the best method available to prevent fads from escalating into more serious problems.

Because western pleasure emphasises calmness and manners, some individuals attempt to circumvent good training by using tranquilizers to steady their horses. However, drug rules of both the AQHA and USEF are strict, and both owners and trainers of horses that test positive for drugs are sanctioned heavily.

=== Tail deadening ===
Another abusive practice that is penalized if discovered is the process of "nerving" the horse's tail. If a horse is bored and irritable, it will express its displeasure by swishing its tail vigorously. Horses who are shown too long and schooled too repetitively can become "ring sour," a term used to describe a horse with a bored, unhappy and irritable manner, and often a ring sour horse will flatten its ears and swish its tail every time it is given a command. Because tail swishing is penalized, some competitors resorted to cutting the nerves in a ring sour horse's tail to prevent the tail from moving. Because this also keeps the horse from brushing away flies, leaving it helpless against biting insects, the practice was quickly banned, and horses with nerved tails are no longer allowed in the show ring. However, some competitors still resort to temporarily numbing the tail with drugs, alcohol injections, or by mechanical means. All methods are illegal if discovered but, as no scars remain, can be difficult to spot. The practice of nerving the tail was less of a problem in breeds where a high-carried tail is a breed trait, though temporarily numbing the tail is not completely unknown even in these breeds.

=== "Headset" trends ===
The sport of western pleasure has been criticized on account of an extremely low head position many judges were favoring in the stock horse breeds, known as the "peanut roller." In this head set, horses carry their heads with the poll far below the level of their withers. This is a problem because it also forced the horse to travel at an extremely slow pace on the "forehand" (carrying too much weight on their front legs instead of rocking it correctly back onto their hind legs). Over long periods of time, moving in this highly artificial frame can cause soundness problems in some horses, and even a sound horse cannot properly bring its hindquarters under its body when traveling forward. This fad and its problems created a poor view of the discipline as a whole, especially by competitors in other equestrian sports.

The industry has adjusted its rules to penalize the "peanut roller" fad, though excessively low head positions are still seen at times. In the USEF, included a requirement that a horse must have its poll no lower than the height of its withers, or, in the case of the AQHA, a rule stating that the ideal gait shall be performed with a "level topline." Additional rules make an extreme headset more difficult by asking exhibitors to extend gaits during a class. In the case of the AQHA, videos were sent out to all licensed judges to demonstrate what was and was not correct, and the materials also made available to the general public.

=== Spur stop controversy ===
A current trend seen in nearly all breeds requires a horse to perform with an extremely loose, draped rein at all times. Western pleasure horses have always traveled on a fairly loose rein, but in recent years the visible "drape" in the rein has become exaggerated. However, it requires time, good riding ability, and careful training to correctly teach a horse "self carriage," particularly to slow or stop by responding to only a rider's use of seat position (and sometimes voice) without tightening the reins. Thus, an alternative method of training to slow a horse down without the use of the reins gave rise to a new, highly controversial, technique known as the "spur stop," an unconventional method used by some trainers to train horses to slow down and stop when spur pressure is applied.

Because spur, heel or leg pressure is generally used to ask a horse to go faster, this technique is sometimes referred to by its critics as "riding the brake" and is frowned upon by several major western pleasure sanctioning organizations since at least 2003, when AQHA put out a series of videos on correct and incorrect style and way of going for western pleasure horses, showing a "hit list" of undesirable traits not to be rewarded in the show ring, with the spur stop leading the list.

This controversy in Western Pleasure circles resembles the debate over Rollkur in the field of dressage, particularly over the question of whether the practice constitutes animal abuse.

Experts differ on the validity of the spur stop. As stated by trainer Bob Avila: "the spur stop is “the worst thing ever invented. If I were to get a horse in for training that had a spur stop on him, I could do one event on him, period: Western pleasure.” Taking the opposing view, Mark Sheridan, an AQHA judge and trainer, has said: "You should not have any problems with the spur stop, and the transition to whatever events you decide to do with [the horse]. Personally, I put a spur stop on just the stop and back, on my western riders."

A less extreme method is referred to as putting "buttons" on the horse. A "button" is simply a leg or spur position that is trained by operant conditioning that tells the horse to travel at a particular gait or speed. These are often highly customized to an individual horse and rider team. While less extreme than the spur stop, such techniques still take the horse away from traditional responses to the riding aids of seat, hands, weight and voice, which can also lead to an excessively artificial way of going by the animal.

== See also ==
- Horse show – Judged exhibition of horses
- Western riding – Style of horseback riding which evolved from the ranching and warfare traditions
- Western saddle – Horse riding equipment
