= Rein-back =

Dressage technique

"Rein-back" is a dressage term to indicate the two-beat movement in which a horse is asked to back up. The horse picks up and sets down its feet almost in diagonal pairs, and moves straight backwards with the line of his forelegs following those of his hind. The horse should remain on the aids during the rein-back.

The rein-back should be practiced sparingly, as it can easily over-stress the horse's back and joints. This is especially true if the rider tries to force the horse into the movement.

== Asking for the rein-back ==
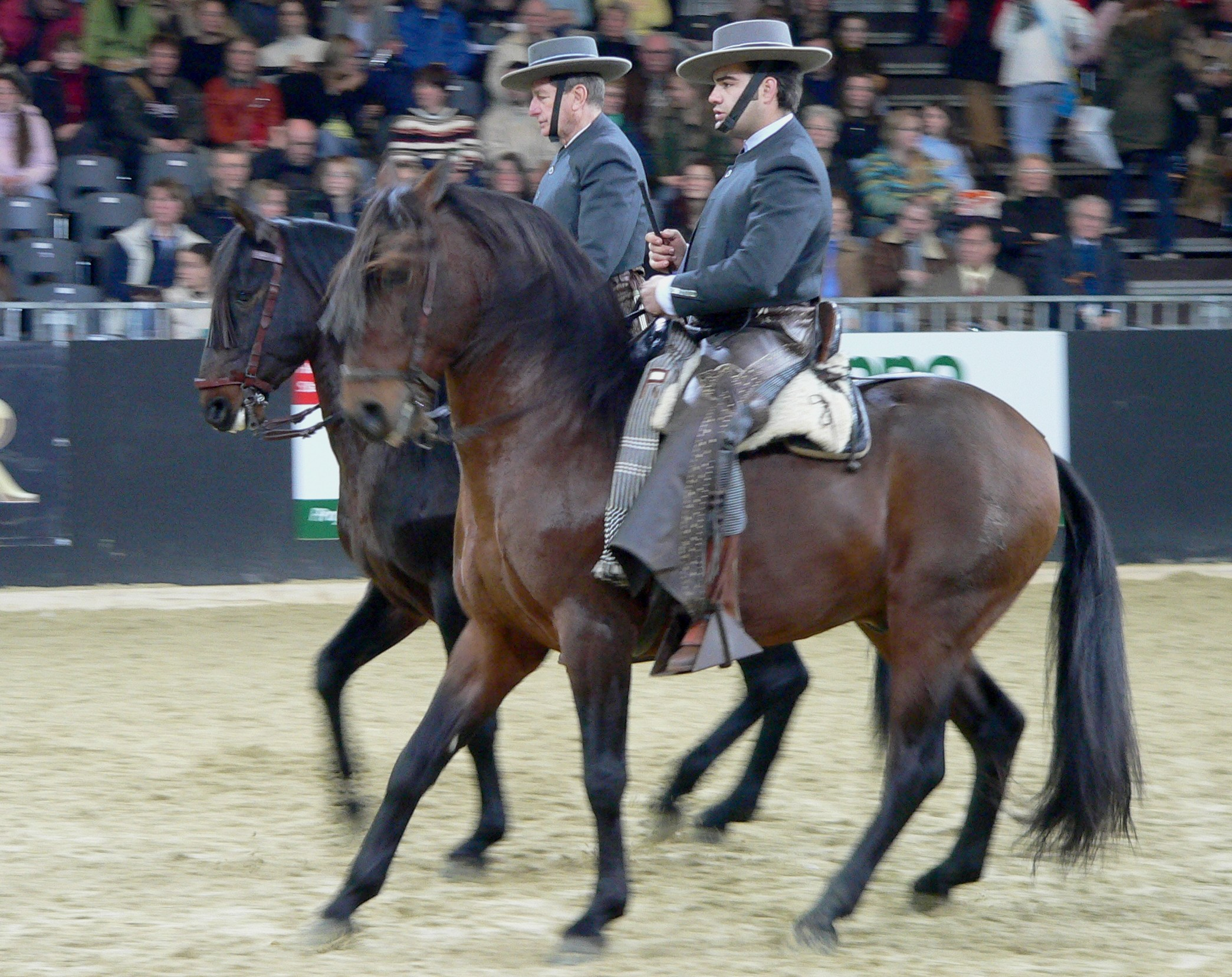
The reinback, clearly helping to engage the horse's hind end.

To perform the rein-back, the rider applies both leg aids and a resisting hand. The leg asks the horse to move, but the hand prevents the horse from going forward, so it instead releases that energy in a step back. As soon as the horse begins to step back, the aids are released. The rein-back should be performed in a straight line, with the rider's legs used softly behind the girth to keep the hindquarters straight.

The upper body of the rider stays upright, leaning neither forward nor back. Leaning back is especially bad, as it drives the seat bones of the rider into the horse, causing the animal to hollow its back.

It is sometimes useful to transfer the weight of the seat onto the thighs when asking for the rein back, so that the horse may easily round up through its back and engage its hind end.

When the rider wishes the horse to stop moving back, the rider sits deeper into his seat, adds more leg, and lightens his contact with the horse's mouth.

== Common faults ==
One of the most common faults in the rein-back is resistance by the horse. Instead of remaining on the aids, the animal tenses up and throws his head up or does not soften to the bit. This is usually the case if the rider tries to pull the horse backwards rather than asking with the legs aids or if the rider sits too heavily on his mount's back.

Other faults may include crookedness, laziness (horse is inactive and drags his feet), or rushing.

== Uses ==
The rein-back is occasionally asked for in equitation classes, in dressage tests (Grand Prix, eventing, and combined driving), reining competition, and is also on the trail, as it can be used to maneuver out of a tight situation.

The rein-back is a training tool. The movement requires the horse to engage and move his weight to his hindquarters.
