= Liverpool bit =

Bit for driving horses

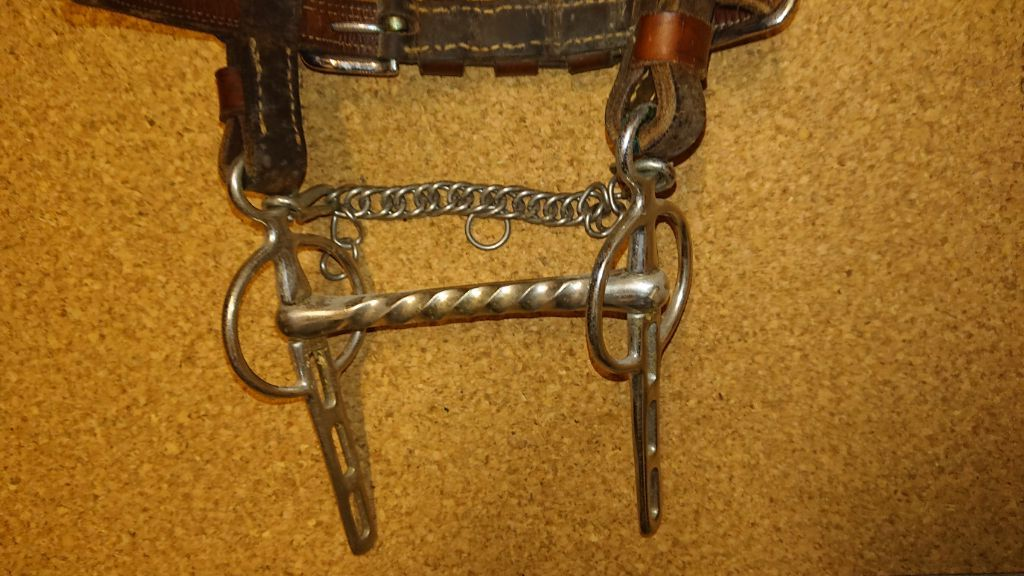
A Liverpool bit

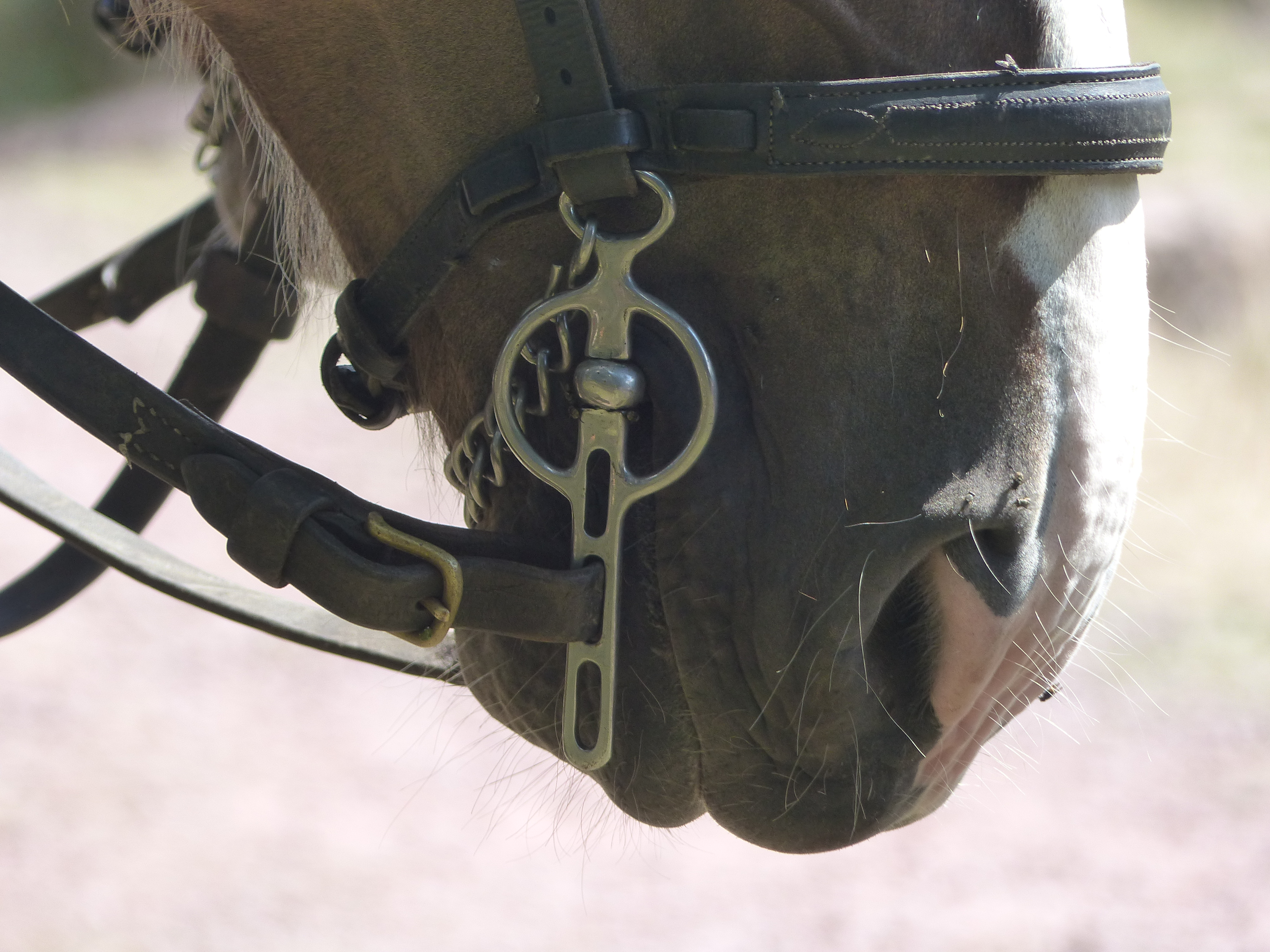
Liverpool bit with reins attached in the middle slot

A Liverpool bit is a type of bit mainly used on driving horses. The Liverpool is characterized by its circular ring and the straight side piece with three slots, offering several positions for attaching reins. Different positions change the severity of the bit through its pivoting action. The lower the reins are attached, the more severe the bit acts on the horse's mouth.

== History and naming ==
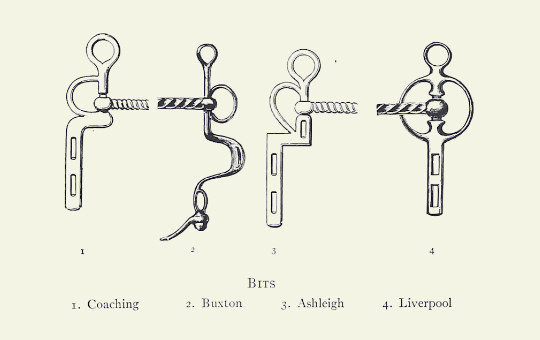
Four carriage bits, including the Liverpool (right)

The Liverpool bit is, as its name suggests, an English-designed bit invented in the United Kingdom in the 19th century. However, its principle of action and operation seems to have been known before that time, and applied to other bits of different shape and design. It was specifically designed for use in double harness, as other bits tended to pinch the horse's cheeks. Some varieties of Liverpool bits were better known as Manchester bits.

In French, this bit is commonly called Mors Liverpool. It was first used in France in the early 20th century. A 1905 issue of the Journal des Éleveurs recommended using the Liverpool bit when driving in pairs.

== Description ==
The Liverpool bit is considered to be in the curb bit family. It is made of metal and features a circular bit ring, topped by a smaller ring used to attach the bridle leather, and with two straight shanks with three places for attaching reins, which can create a powerful leverage effect. The mouthpiece, which passes through the horse's mouth, can take a variety of shapes such as straight or curved, but is not articulated (jointed). Bits with straight mouthpieces can be flipped to use the smooth side or the rough side in the horse's mouth.

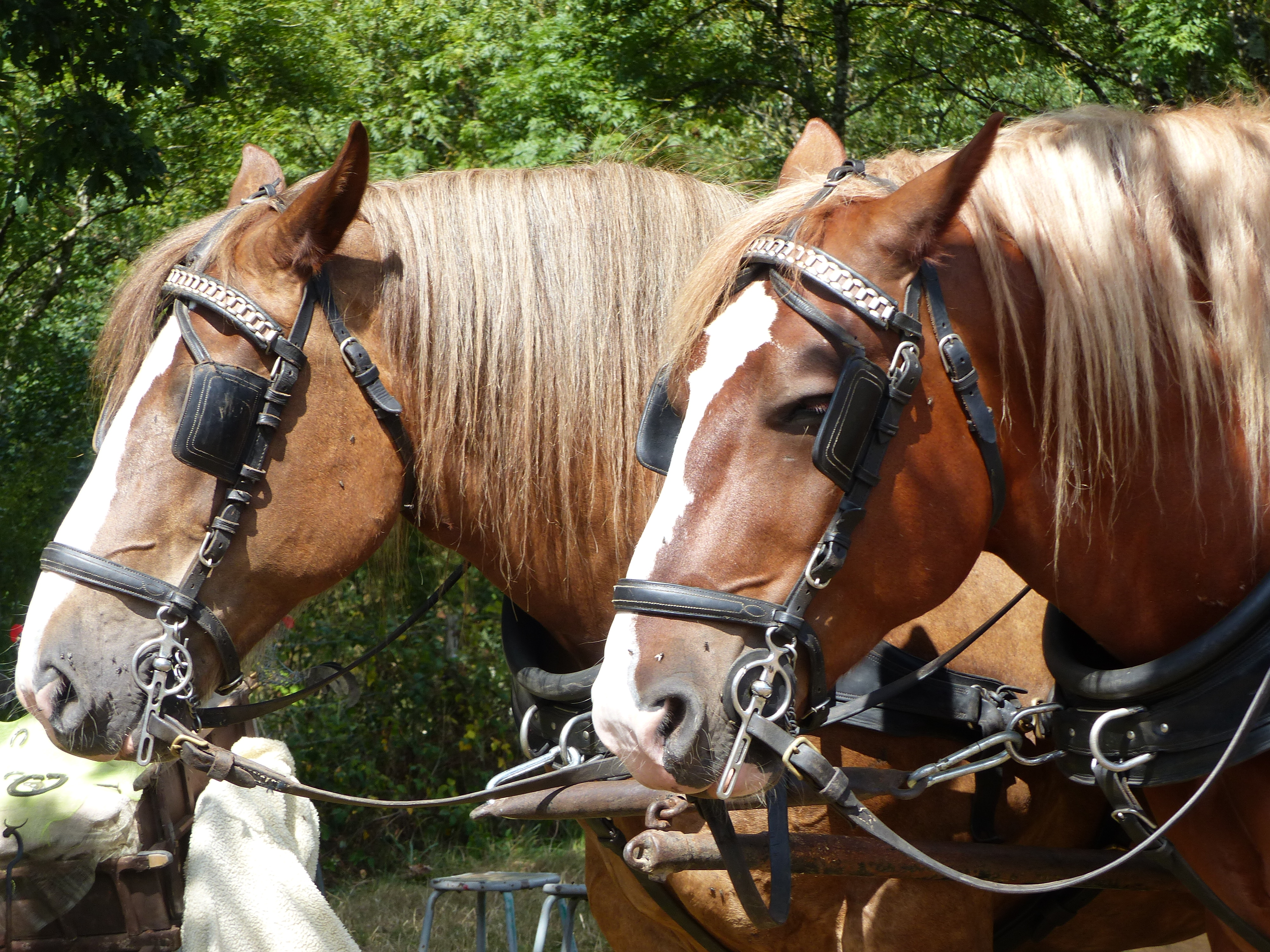
This pair are wearing identical Liverpool bits, but the nearest horse's severity is set at rough cheek, and the further horse is set at the more severe half cheek

Like all curb bits, the Liverpool operates with a pivoting lever principle, applying pressure on the horse's jaw, which is transmitted by the curb chain, a small metal chain passing under the jaw. Two anchoring points are designed to receive the curb chain. The use of a curb chain is not mandatory.

The severity of this bit on the horse depends on three factors:

- the positioning of the reins among the four available attachment points;
- the experience of the rider or driver holding the reins;
- the tightness of the curb chain.

The lower the reins are attached to the bit, the greater the leverage created, and the more severe the bit. The first possible attachment position, known as smooth cheek, is located in the bit ring. The second position is the top slot of the shank, and is called rough cheek. The second slot is half cheek or middle bar. The last slot is known as full cheek or bottom bar or full curb, and is the most severe setting.

== Usage ==
The Liverpool bit is frequently used in combined driving, and draft horse showing. It is useful for training young driving horses, and for tempering headstrong horses. It is reputed to make horses more responsive to the driver, and most driving horses seem to tolerate this bit well.

== See also ==
- Bit (horse)
- Driving (horse)
- Horse harness
- Pelham bit
