= Kimblewick bit =

Horse tack

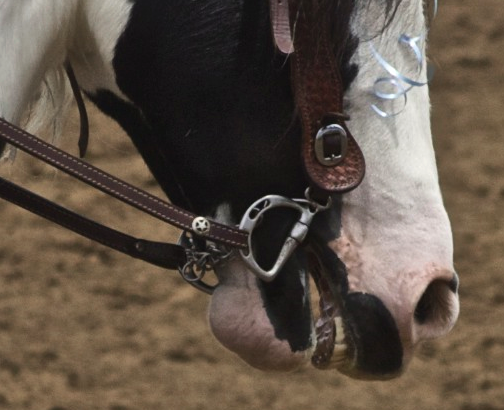
An Uxeter or slotted Kimblewick, with the rein on the lower slot, making the action stronger

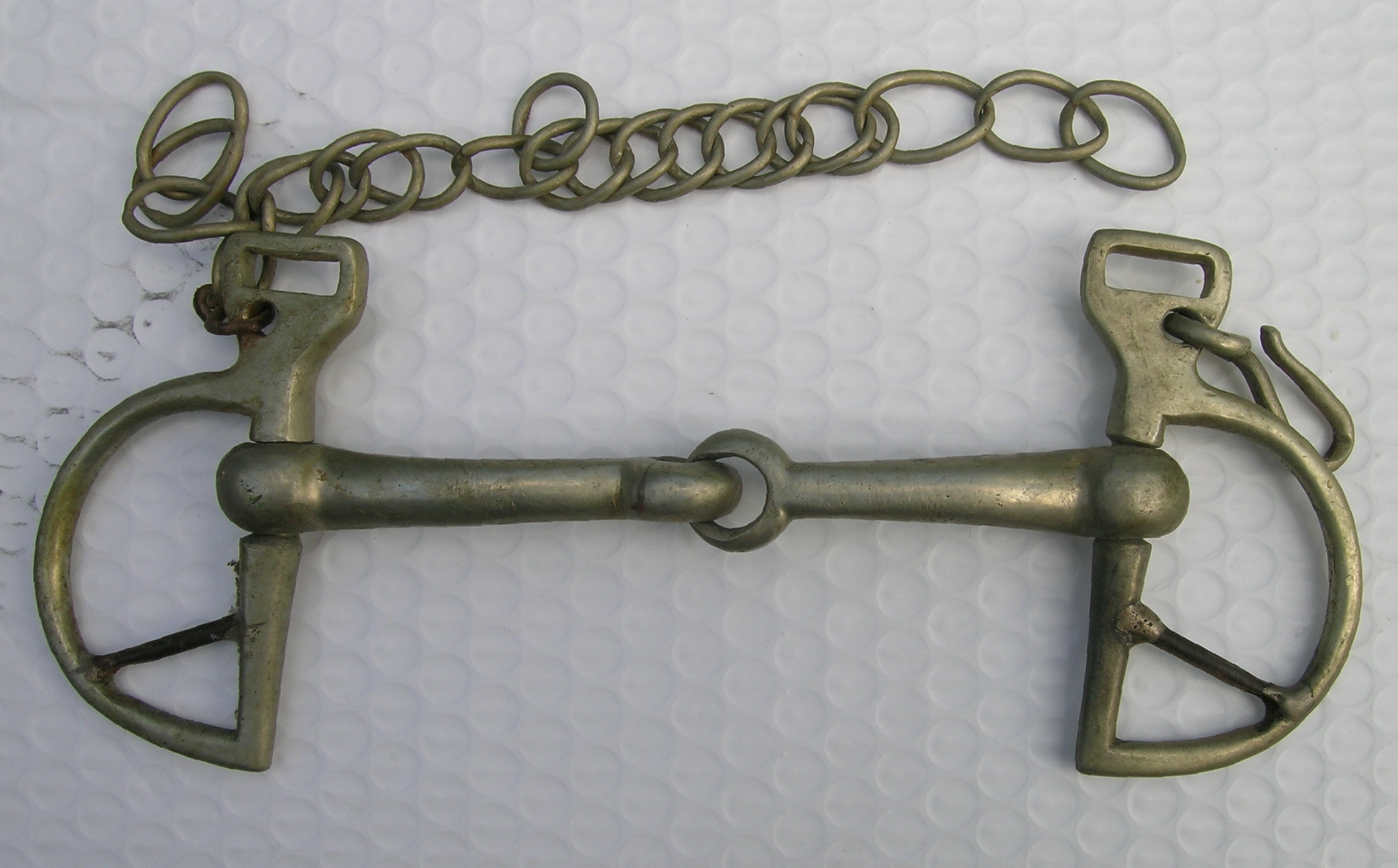
An old solid nickel Kimblewick bit.

A Kimblewick, Kimberwicke or Kimberwick is a type of bit used on a horse and named after the English town of Kimblewick, where it was first made. The bit has bit shanks, D-shaped rings and a curb chain. Owing to its shanks it is regarded as a type of curb bit. The curb action is minimal to mild, however, because the shanks have short purchase arms and no lever arms (see Lever). Some variations increase the curb action. A Kimblewick is used with one set of reins.

== Design ==
This bit was originally called the Kimblewick after the English town where it first appeared. It was invented by show-jumper, horseman and farmer Felix Oliver (aka Phil). Oliver & his family lived at Meadacre Farm, Kimblewick, and started a partnership with Harry Payne, from Bushey, that was to make his reputation with such horses as Red Admiral, Red Star, Sheila, Galway Bay and Planet. Oliver rode the horses himself at that time, including many winners of point-to-pointing. His eldest son, Alan, began show-jumping as a schoolboy and, schooled by his father, became one of the top names in show-jumping. With his second son, Paul, Oliver produced many successful ponies. His daughter Vivien was also a very successful rider. In 1967, after the death of Payne, he formed a partnership with Leonard Crawthraw. After his retirement farming in 1974 he lived in Longwick, where he schooled and advising young riders. However in its early years of use it was also known as the Spanish jumping bit. The D ring is offset, so the bit mouthpiece is on the upper part of the flat side of the D, creating a small amount of leverage, supported by a curb chain. This allows the Kimblewick to have a mild curb bit effect.

Like the pelham and curb bits in general, the Kimblewick has bit shanks with purchase arms. However unlike those other bits its shanks have no lever arm. Owing to the purchase arm and geometry of the rings, the rings may function as very short lever arms and create a small amount of leverage, which puts this type of bit into the pelham or curb bit family. The curb function varies with the style of bit: slotted Kimblewicks provide the option of more curb action whereas unslotted Kimblewicks are very close in function to the Baucher bit, which most users regard as a snaffle bit, and to the pelham bit when the snaffle rein is used.

Depending on the position of the rider's hands, the standard Kimblewick has different effects when the rein is allowed to slide freely along the curved portion of the D-ring. If the rider's hands are held high there is no leverage effect. If the rider's hands are low the slight leverage effect can be used. However one popular design, the Uxeter Kimblewick, has slots in the curved portion of the ring so that the rein may be fixed into one position. This increases the curb effect, especially when the rein is fastened in the lower of the two slots.

Kimblewick bits have a variety of bit mouthpieces. The original design has a ported mouthpiece but it is now also manufactured with others, including a solid, unjointed mullen mouth, and a single-jointed mouthpiece.

== Use ==
Kimblewicks are not as widely used as snaffles and pelhams and are banned in some horse show competition classes, notably dressage and show hunter. Kimblewicks are regarded by some people as unconventional or non-classic and the design, which combines snaffle and curb features, may lead some horses to either overflex in the bit or learn to lean on it. However they do offer the rider a slight curb effect without the risk of a shank getting caught on something, which is useful for contact sports such as polocrosse and provide a bit more control than a snaffle, which can be helpful for smaller riders on strong horses. They are commonly used for ponies and stronger horses.
