= Bit ring =

Ring on the side of a horse's bit

The bit ring is the ring on the side of a horse's bit, particularly on a snaffle bit. It is used as a point of attachment for the cheekpieces of the bridle and for the reins. It also has an effect on the action of the bit. Therefore, the design of the ring is something to consider when choosing a bit for a horse, even though the bit mouthpiece generally has a greater effect than the ring.

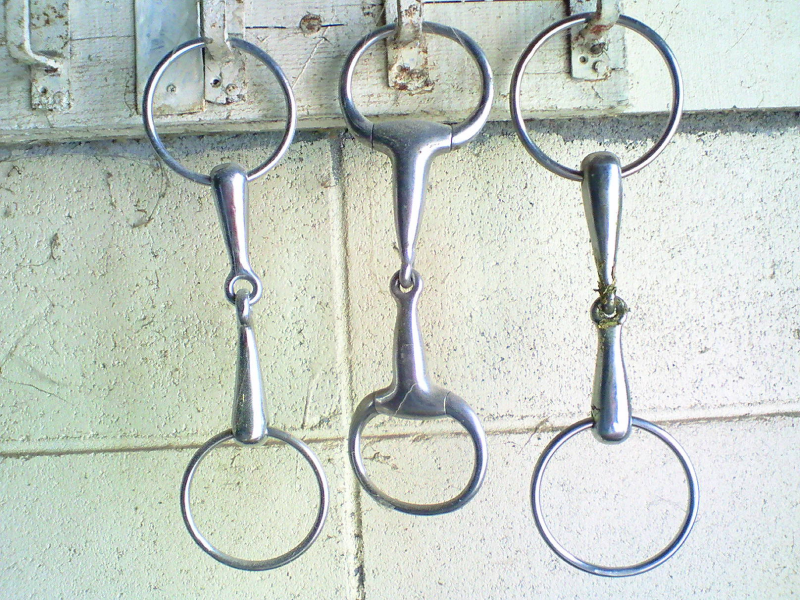
Loose-ring (either side) and eggbutt (middle) snaffles.

Choices in bit rings can be found in direct pressure bits such as snaffle bits or bradoons. Leverage bits such as the pelham, and curb bit have a bit shank rather than a bit ring. (see bit shank). The Kimblewick has a unique design in that the side of the bit resembles a bit ring, but actually is a very short bit shank, as it applies leverage pressure to the mouthpiece.

Bit ring designs also are subject to fads. The loose ring is currently one of the most popular overall designs, but several years ago the eggbutt and dee-ring were quite common. There are also differences in the popularity of a given design from one discipline to another and from geographic region to the next.

== Loose ring ==
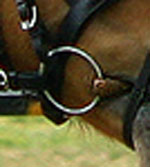
Loose-ring snaffle.

Types of Bits: Found on snaffles, gag bits, and bradoons.

Action: The loose ring is a circular ring which may rotate around on the mouthpiece. The sliding makes it more difficult for the horse to tighten against it, promoting relaxation and chewing from the horse. The loose ring therefore keeps the bit more mobile than any other ring type. The ring will also rotate slightly before the bit mouthpiece adds pressure to the mouth, thus allowing it to give more signal than a more fixed bit.

Disadvantages: the loose ring may pinch the corners of the lips as it rotates, causing pain to the horse. This is especially a problem if the bit mouthpiece is too small. If this occurs, a bit guard may be used. The bit mouthpiece should be slightly wider (to accommodate the bit guard) should one be used; it is best if it is at least 1/2 inch wider than required by the horse's mouth. There are some horses that dislike the rattling noise of the loose ring. Additionally, the loose-ring is more easily pulled through the mouth than a bit with cheeks.

Size and Thickness of the Rings: Rings are generally 2–5 inches in diameter, most commonly ranging in the 2.5–3 inch range that is legal for horse show competition. Rings for bradoons are smaller than those used on a plain snaffle. Rings may be larger on gag bits, especially if the rider wishes to increase the severity. Thickness ranges from 10 to 23 mm, with most found at 15 mm.

Mouthpiece: comes in many mouthpiece sizes, with 5" being the most standard size for the average horse, with a range from 3" for miniature horses to over 6 inches for a large warmblood or a draft horse. Various metals are used, and mouthpieces may be made in almost any type (see bit mouthpiece).

Uses: One of the three most popular designs, loose rings are often used for training young horses, as the action is mild and the loose movement of the ring provides warning prior to rein pressure. The loose ring is the most common bit seen at the lower levels of dressage and on junior horses in western riding disciplines. It is also seen through all the levels of eventing (especially in the dressage phase), and is a common bit for race horses and some show jumpers.

== Eggbutt/Barrel head ==
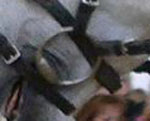
Eggbutt ring.

Types of Bits: Found on snaffles, gag bits, and bradoons. Pelham bits also usually have an eggbutt design for the snaffle ring on the shank.

Action: the eggbutt has a slightly oval (egglike) shape, and consists of a round outer ring attached to a more upright, straighter cheek which is fixed to the mouthpiece. The ring can move back and forth where it attached to the cheek, but does not rotate like the loose-ring, and so is more stable in the horse's mouth, and not as fixed as the other types of rings.

Advantages: This is a mild bit and will not pinch like the loose ring.

Disadvantages: It is more easily pulled through the mouth than a bit with cheeks.

Size and Thickness of Rings: The rings range from rounder and thinner to wider and flatter in shape. Their thickness varies from 10-23mm, and most are about 3" across.

Mouthpiece: This is also a popular bit that comes in many sizes, ranging from 3–6.5 inches. The mouthpiece is usually solid, but may be hollow mouthed.

Uses: Eggbutts are overall one of the most popular ring designs, less common in the dressage arena than loose-rings, more often seen in show hunter disciplines. They are popular for riding schools, and sometimes in horse racing. Eggbutts are sometimes seen in eventing, show jumping, and equitation riding. They are occasionally seen in western riding. Eggbutts are also useful as a gentle design with which to start young horses.

== Dee-ring/Racing snaffle ==
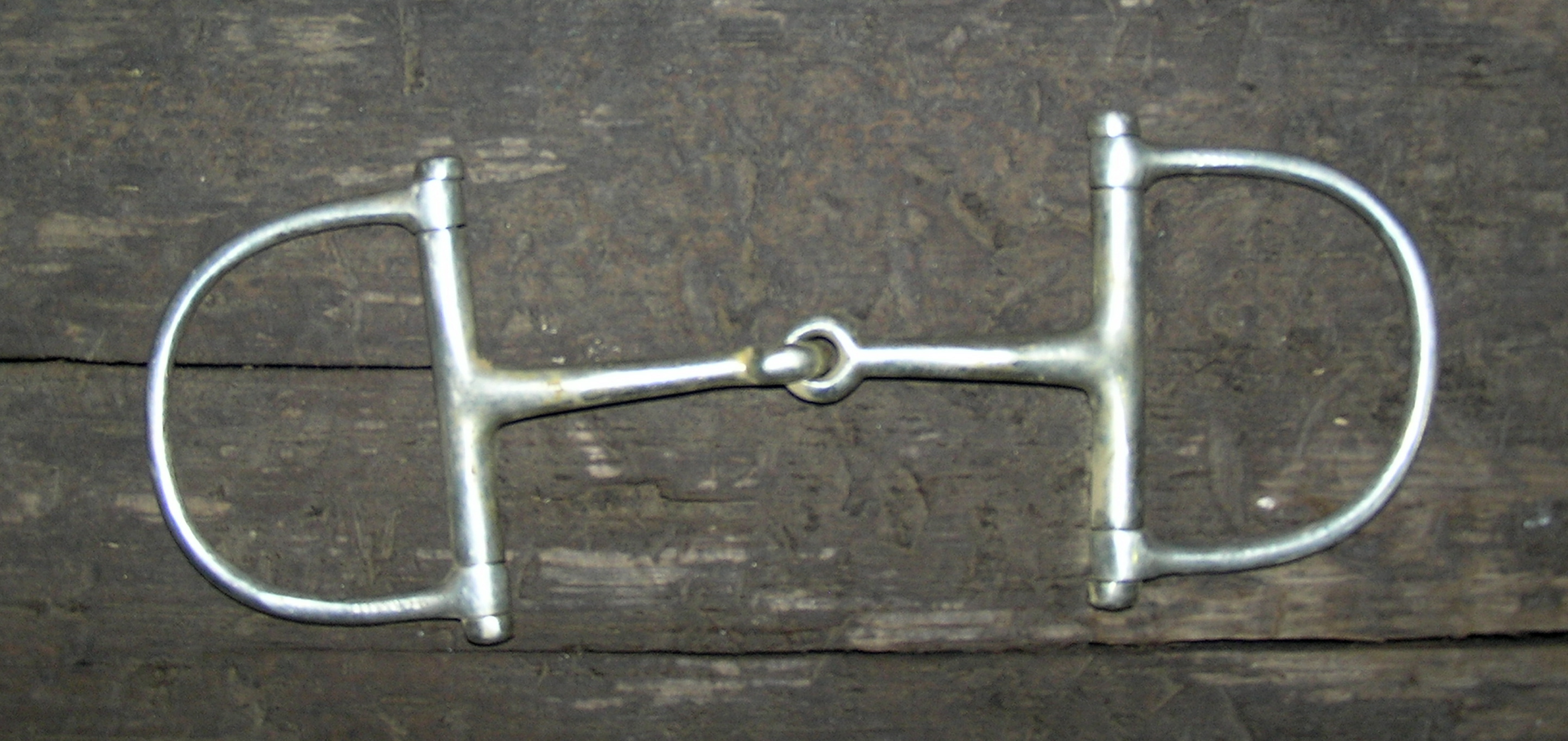
Dee-ring.

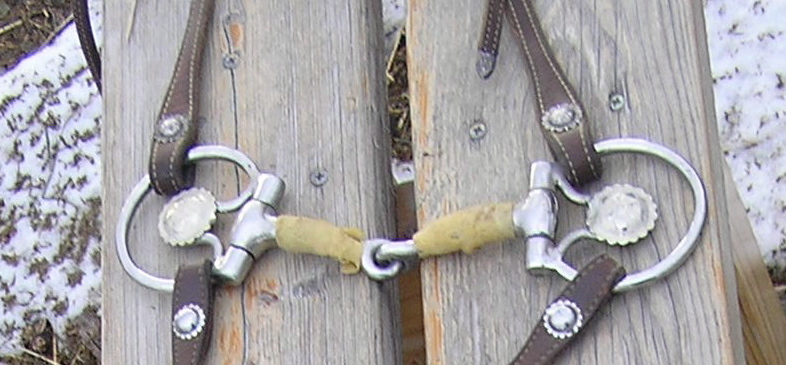
Pinchless Dee-ring variation with decorative conchos added

Types of Bits: snaffle. The Kimblewick shank has a modified Dee-ring design.

Action: the Dee-ring, as its name suggest, has a ring shape like a "D" with the cheek side of the "D" attached to the mouthpiece of the bit. The straight bars of the Dee-ring provide a slight lateral guiding effect. This is because the bit ring is pulled against the side of the mouth opposite the rein that is activated, pushing the sides of the Dee against the horse's mouth, encouraging a turn. The Dee-ring is fixed in the horse's mouth, because its shape does not allow the bit to rotate. The Dee-ring is most similar to the full cheek.

Advantages: does not pinch like the loose ring, and is not as likely to be pulled through the mouth as a loose ring or eggbutt. Otherwise is fairly mild, but acts quickly on the mouth of the horse.

Disadvantages: Has little loose movement and thus provides less warning to the horse.

Size and Thickness of the Rings: The ring is usually about 3" in width, although they may reach 5" (a popular size for race horses, but illegal for horse shows). The larger the ring size, the more lateral guiding effect it has.

Mouthpiece: varies in thickness, and may be hollow or solid. Generally comes in a variety of sizes and a wide variety of mouthpieces.

Uses: Another very popular design, the Dee-ring was the traditional bit used in hunt seat riding, and is still seen in that discipline. It is also one of the most popular designs in horse racing. The D-ring is not seen as often in dressage, eventing or show jumping. A modified Dee-ring design with the straight side and a rounder ring is sometimes seen in western riding.

== Full cheek ==
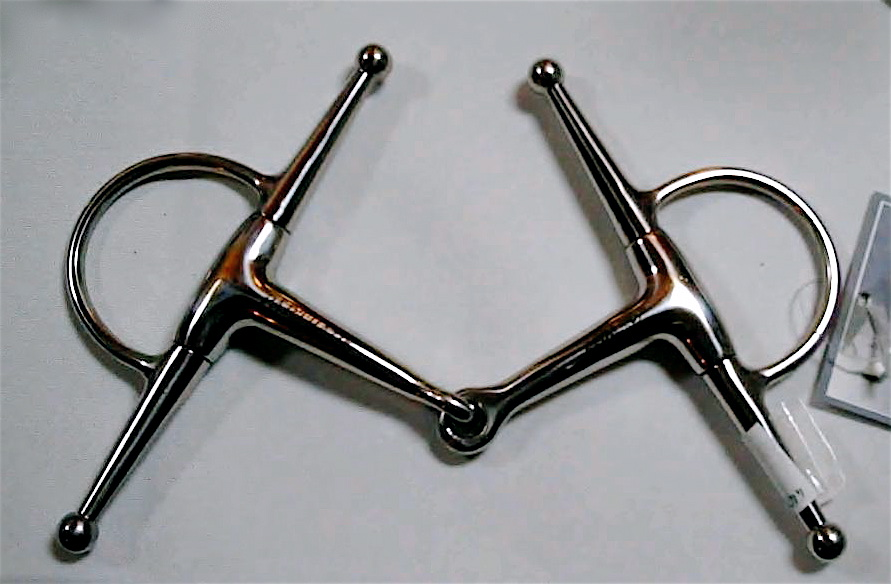
Full-cheek bit

Types of Bits: snaffle

Action: The cheeks of these bits extend both upward and downward, tapering as they get farther away from the mouthpiece, with a half-moon ring similar in shape to the Dee-ring or eggbutt (depending on the design). The long sides provide a great deal of lateral guiding effect. The full cheek without bit keepers is more fixed in the mouth than a loose ring, and thus has a similar action to the eggbutt or Dee-ring. Use of bit keepers, however, makes the full cheek even more fixed than the Dee-ring, concentrating bit pressure on the bars and tongue.

Advantages: The full-cheek is not as likely to be pulled through the mouth as a loose-ring or eggbutt and gives considerable lateral commands.

Disadvantages: The full-cheek can easily jab or be caught on something if bit keepers are not used. In some cases, a young horse may be scared by the strong lateral pressure of the full cheek. Bit guards can help this problem.

Adjustment: The full cheek should be adjusted like any normal snaffle, although it may be placed slightly lower in the mouth when bit keepers are used. When choosing this bit, it may be best to test ride with and without bit keepers, depending on the needs of the horse.

Mouthpieces: Range in all sizes and thickness (10–21 mm). Usually in solid mouths, although hollow mouths are available.

Uses: The full cheek is becoming more popular and is now seen in many disciplines, including dressage, eventing, show jumping, western riding and hunt seat. Additionally, the guiding effect makes it popular for use on young horses.

== Half-cheek/Half-spoon ==
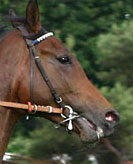
Half-cheek bit ring shown on a Dexter bit (also called a ring bit)

Type of bit: snaffle

Action: As the name suggests, the half-cheek has only a lower cheek, though occasionally the bit is put on upside down, with the half cheek pointing up. The cheek is generally flat and spoon-like, as opposed to the long, cylindrical shape of the full cheek. The bit provides some lateral guiding effect, and is more fixed in the mouth than the loose ring.

Advantages: This bit is not as likely to be pulled through the mouth as a loose-ring or eggbutt. Additionally, it is not as likely to be caught on something, which may happen with a full-cheek used without keepers.

Mouthpieces: Size varies, Mouthpieces come in all types, except waterfords are rare.

Uses: The half-cheek is most commonly seen in driving classes, because it is less likely to be caught on the harness. It is also frequently used on young horses in saddle seat disciplines. It is sometimes seen in horse racing.

== Fulmer/Australian loose-ring ==
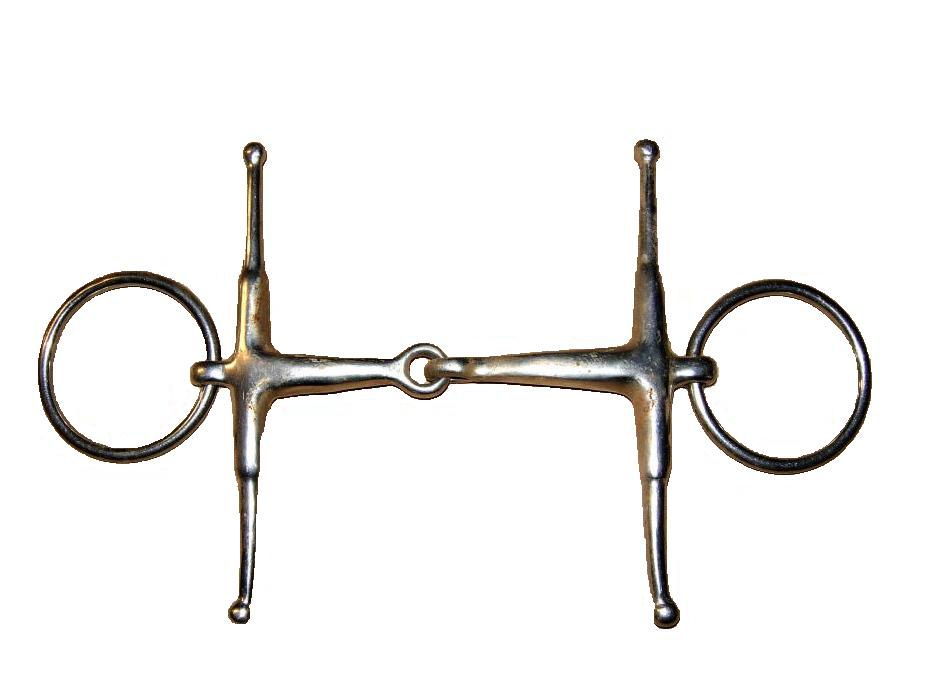
Fulmer snaffle.

Type of Bit: snaffle

Action: The fulmer is similar to the full cheek in that it has an upper and lower cheek, which taper off as they move from the mouthpiece. However, the ring to which the bit is attached is not an eggbutt or Dee-ring design, but a loose ring. This bit therefore gives the lateral guiding effect of the full-cheek, without the rigidity of many other bit rings.

Advantages: Provides the rotation of the loose ring without as great a chance that the ring will pinch. Also prevents the bit from being pulled through the mouth like an eggbutt or loose ring.

Mouthpieces: Usually seen in smooth single- or double-jointed mouthpieces

Uses: not as common in the United States as other bit rings, but seen in a variety of disciplines

== Baucher/Fillis/Hanging cheek/Drop cheek ==
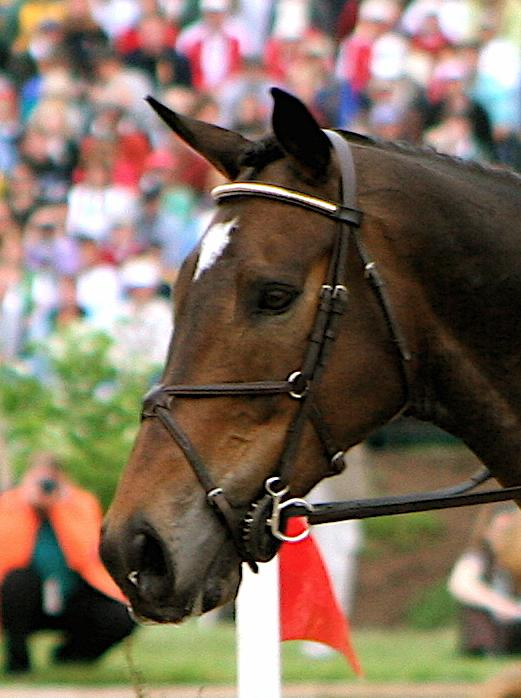
The correct position of the baucher, with the smaller rings attached to the cheekpieces of the bridle.

Type of Bit: snaffle, named after François Baucher, a 19th century French riding master whose theories are still widely followed.

Action: The Baucher has an eggbutt-like ring at the mouthpiece for the rein, with an upper cheek that has a ring at its end, to which the cheekpieces of the bridle are attached. The mouthpiece of a true Baucher does not slide on its ring, though there are Baucher-like designs that do. This bit lies flat against the horse's face, is fixed in the mouth and concentrates pressure on the bars. Contrary to common belief, the bit does not exert poll pressure unless it is put onto the bridle upside-down.

This bit is usually falsely described as creating poll pressure. Most baucher bits don't. In order for it to put pressure on the poll, the ring which the rein attaches to, needs to have a drawn-out oblong shape so that the rein stays at a certain position on the ring. If the ring is oblong, the rein will want to stay at one end, and thus pulls this end up towards the hand/rein. If the ring is round, so that the distance from the mouth bars to the rein is constant at all angles, the rein will slide.

Advantages: will not be pulled through the mouth.

Mouthpieces: All types. The Baucher however is traditionally just a single jointed bit, so you could not technically have a "waterford baucher".

Uses: Not a common design, most often seen in eventing, during the dressage or show jumping phase. Also sometimes used by dressage riders. May be used in preparation for the curb bit. Is never seen in western riding, where it is illegal for show.

- NOTE: the Baucher can be misused in an upside-down position, with the cheek containing the smaller ring hanging below the bit, as if the reins were supposed to attach at that point. Such positioning makes the cheek into a short bit shank, but without a curb chain, there is no poll pressure, merely a rotation of the mouthpiece onto the bars. This fitting is illegal in competition.

== Other ==
- Full-spoon: similar to the full-cheek, except the cheeks are flat and spoon-like instead of round and cylindrical. The cheeks are generally shorter than those found on a full-cheek.
- Flat-ring: Similar to the loose-ring, but the circular ring has been flattened so it has edges. Generally more common in western riding. Has similar action as the loose-ring, though is a little more stable in the horse's mouth and the rings may be less likely to pinch.
- Tubular Butt: Similar to the eggbutt but with a sliding loose-ring and is suitable for use with reins that are connected with various knots.
- Wing Cheek: A relatively recent innovation in snaffle cheeks, the wing bit offers extensive protection at the corners of the horse's mouth by having winged plates on the ends of the mouthpiece that curve around the side of the mouth. Essentially acting like a bit guard, these metal plates ensure that the rings of the bit do not rub or pinch against the sides of the horse's mouth.

== See also ==
- Bridle
- Bit (horse)
- Bit shank
- Horse tack
- Liverpool bit

== References and external links ==
- The Bit Gallery
