= Bit converter =

Horse tack

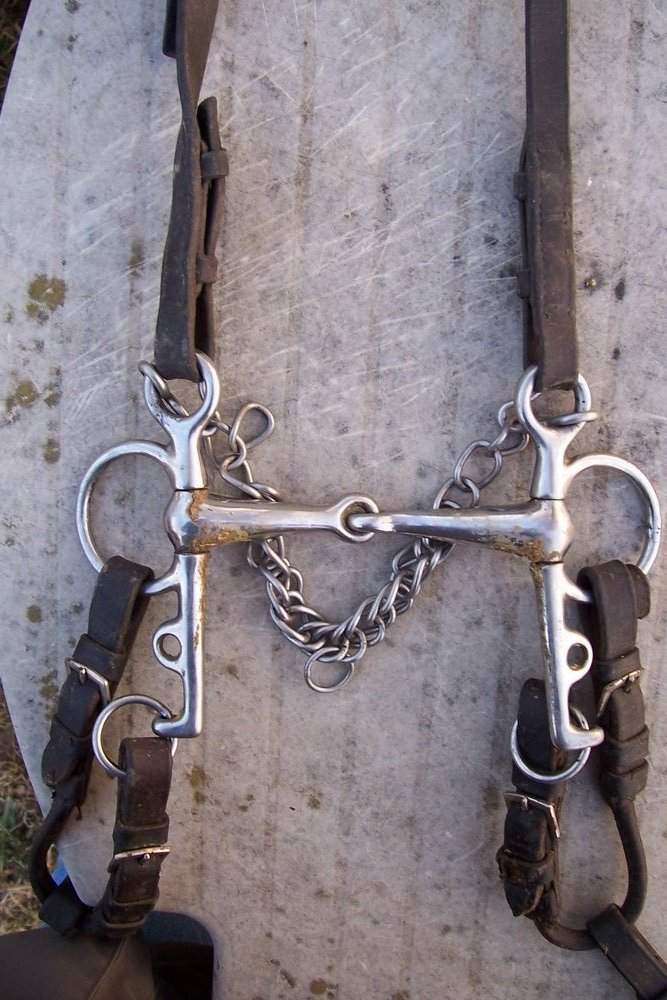
Bit converters/pelham roundings are used on this pelham bit

In horseback riding, bit converter, also known as a pelham rounding, is used on pelham bits to change them from two-rein bits to one-rein bits. It is a leather strap that attaches from the snaffle ring to the curb ring, onto which the rein is then attached to the loop made between the two rings. A bit converter is very helpful when riding the cross-country phase of eventing, so that a rider using a pelham does not have to keep track of two reins— especially helpful when riding drop fences, which require the rider to slip the reins and then gather them back up on landing. It is also commonly used by children, who may have not yet become skilled enough to handle two reins with ease. However, the bit converter diminishes the rider's ability to apply the curb and snaffle functions of the pelham independently and discriminately, and thus is usually considered unsuitable for other types of riding; it is illegal in hunt seat equitation, for example.

A bit converter is also known in some places as 'roundings' or 'pelham roundings'.
