= Bit guard =

Flexible washer used in a horse bit

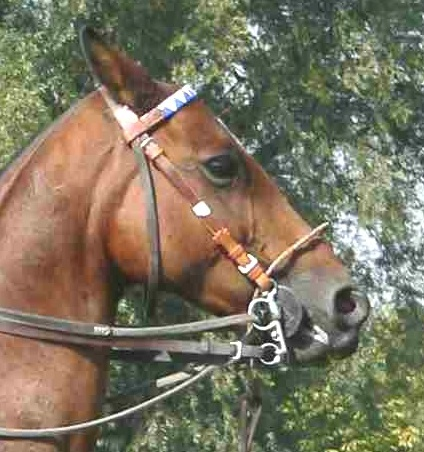
Polo pony wearing a Pelham bit with bit guards

A bit guard (cheek guard in Australia) is a specialty piece of horse tack: a washer, usually made of flexible rubber, that is sometimes used in pairs on a bit.

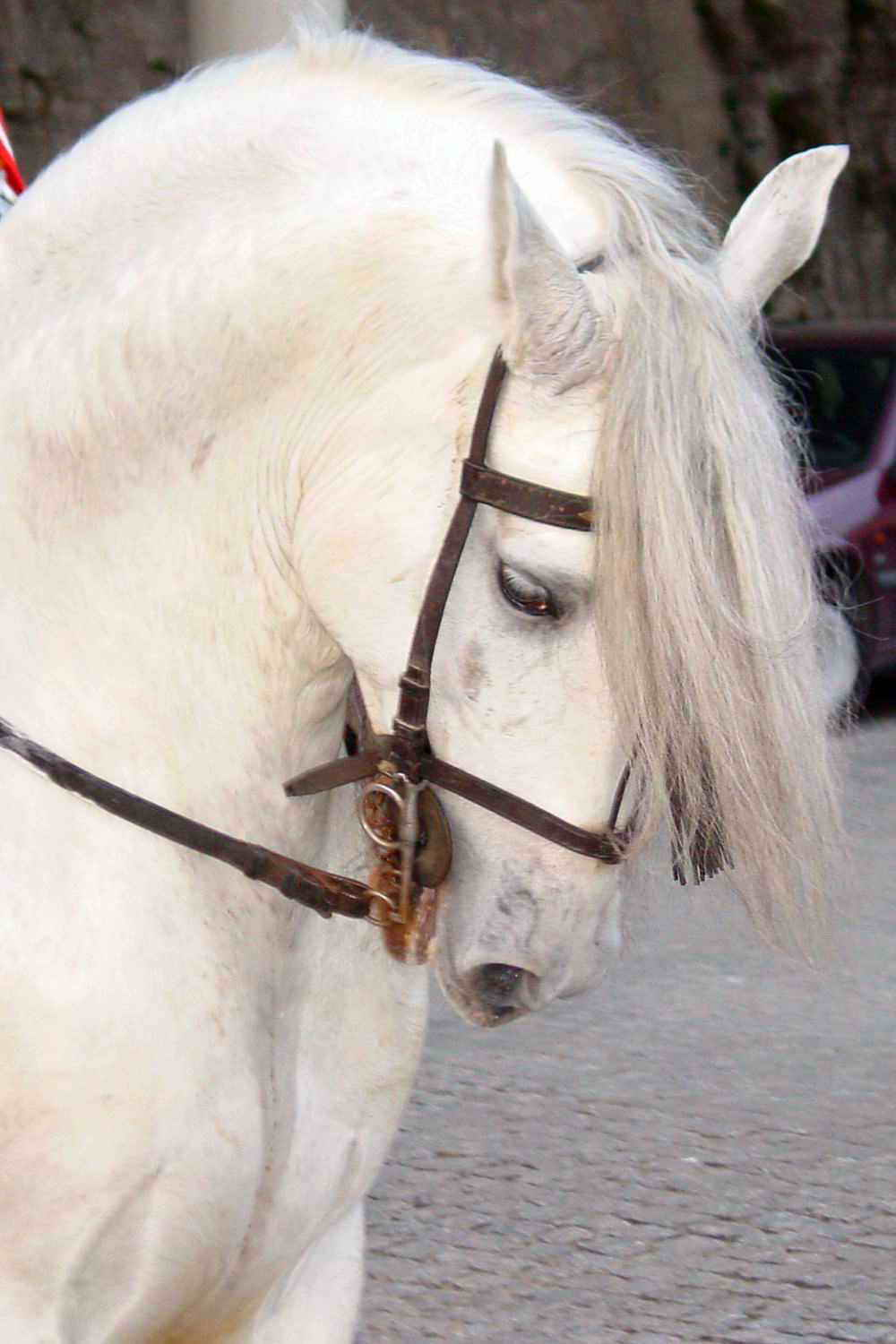
Bit guard on pelham bit

Reasons for using a bit guard include:

- to protect the horse's lips from chafing or pinching by the bit rings
- to provide a better fit when the bit is too wide for the horse's mouth
- to prevent the bit rings from being pulled through the horse's mouth

A pair of bit guards is placed on a bit by stretching them to pass over one bit ring. Then the bit is attached to a bridle. The bridle is then put on a horse so that the bit guards lie outside of the horse's mouth. Bit guards are used with loose ring snaffle bits, gag bits, and pelham bits. Bit guards are used more often in jumping events, such as eventing and show jumping, and in polo. They are not permitted in competitive dressage, and are not used in horse show hunt seat competition.

A pair of bit guards with an integral forked strap, to suspend them from the browband or crownpiece of the bridle, are known as cheekers (see Frentera).

== Bit burr ==
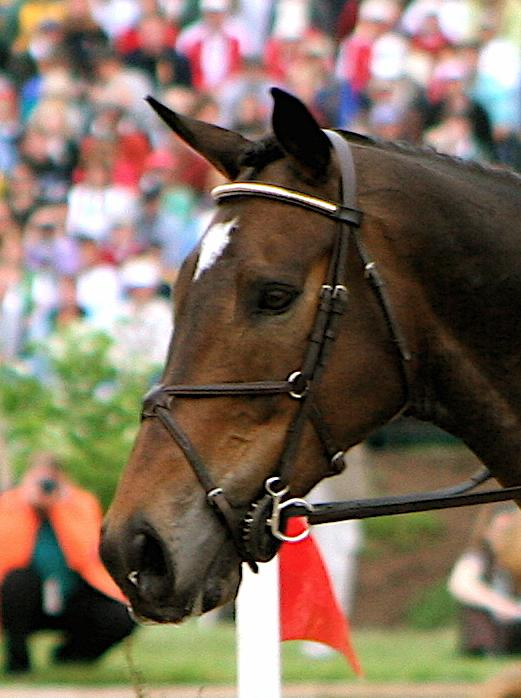
Bit burr

Resembling a bit guard is a bit burr (sometimes burr bit, also bubble cheeker in Australia), which has teeth laid against the horse's cheek. The burr bit was for a time widely used on coach horses in New York City, until the use was stopped in part through the efforts of Henry Bergh circa 1879. Bubble cheekers are approved for use in thoroughbred racing in Australia.
