= Curb bit =

Horse tack

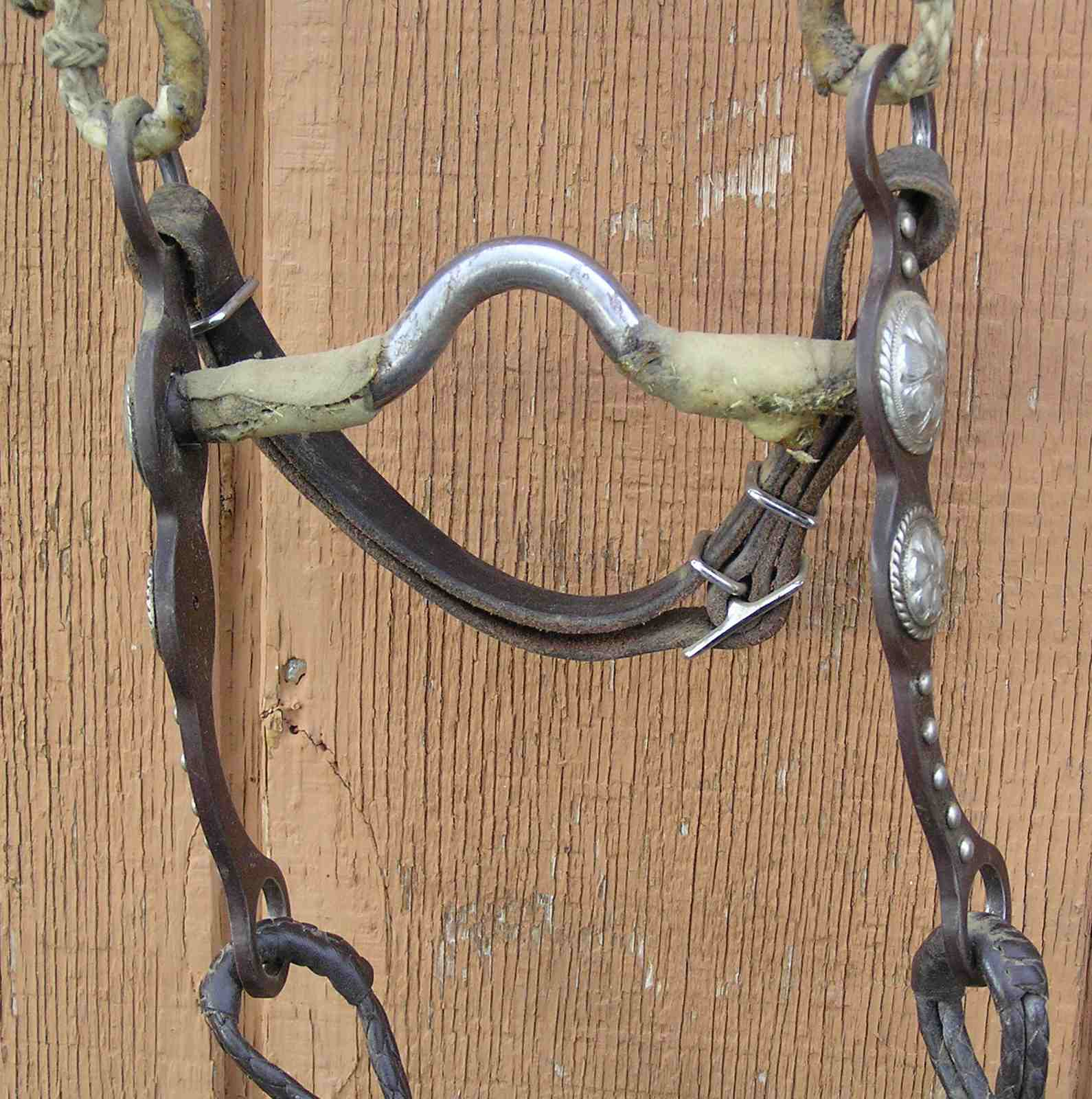
A Western style curb bit with leather curb strap

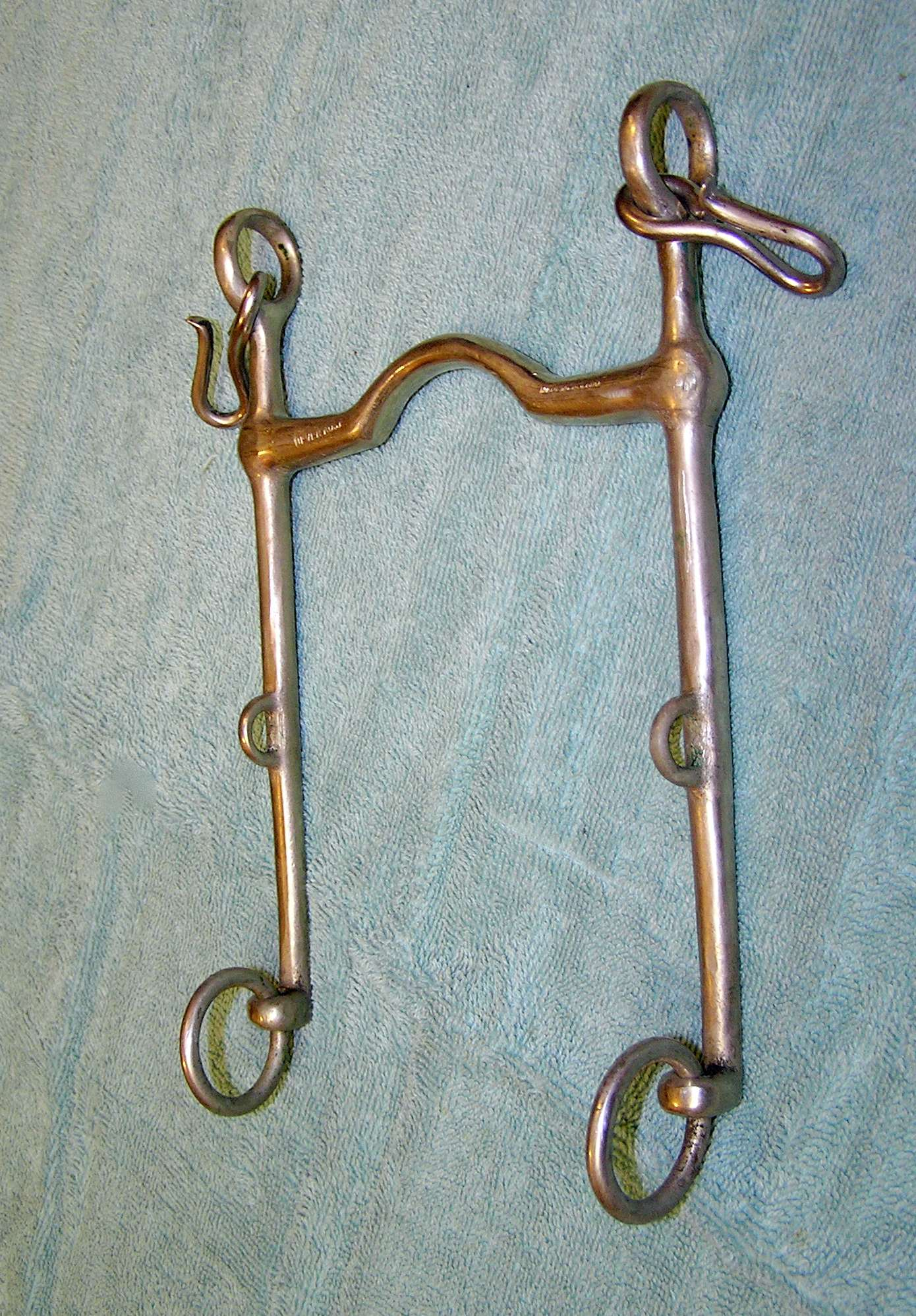
An English style Weymouth curb

A curb bit is a type of bit used for riding horses that uses lever action. It includes the pelham bit and the Weymouth curb along with the traditional "curb bit" used mainly by Western riders.

Kimblewicks or "Kimberwickes" are modified curb bits, and a curb bit is used in a double bridle along with a bradoon. A curb bit is, in general, more severe than a basic snaffle bit, although there are several factors that are involved in determining a bit's severity. Liverpool bits are a type of curb bit commonly used for horses in harness.

== The curb bit ==
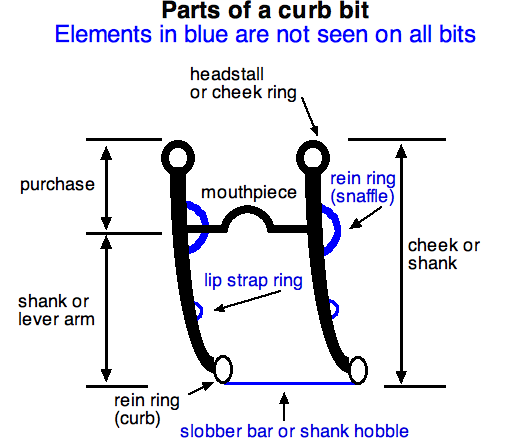
Parts of a curb bit

The curb bit consists of a mouthpiece, curb chain, and a shank, with one ring on each side of the purchase arm of the shank, and one ring on the bottom of the lever arm of the shank. Pelham bits add a ring for a snaffle rein, next to the mouthpiece.

=== Action ===
A curb bit works on several parts of a horse's head and mouth. The bit mouthpiece acts on the bars, tongue and roof of the mouth. The shanks add leverage and place pressure on the poll via the crownpiece of the bridle, to the chin groove via the curb chain, and, especially with a "loose jaw" shank, may act on the sides of the mouth and jaw.

== The shank ==
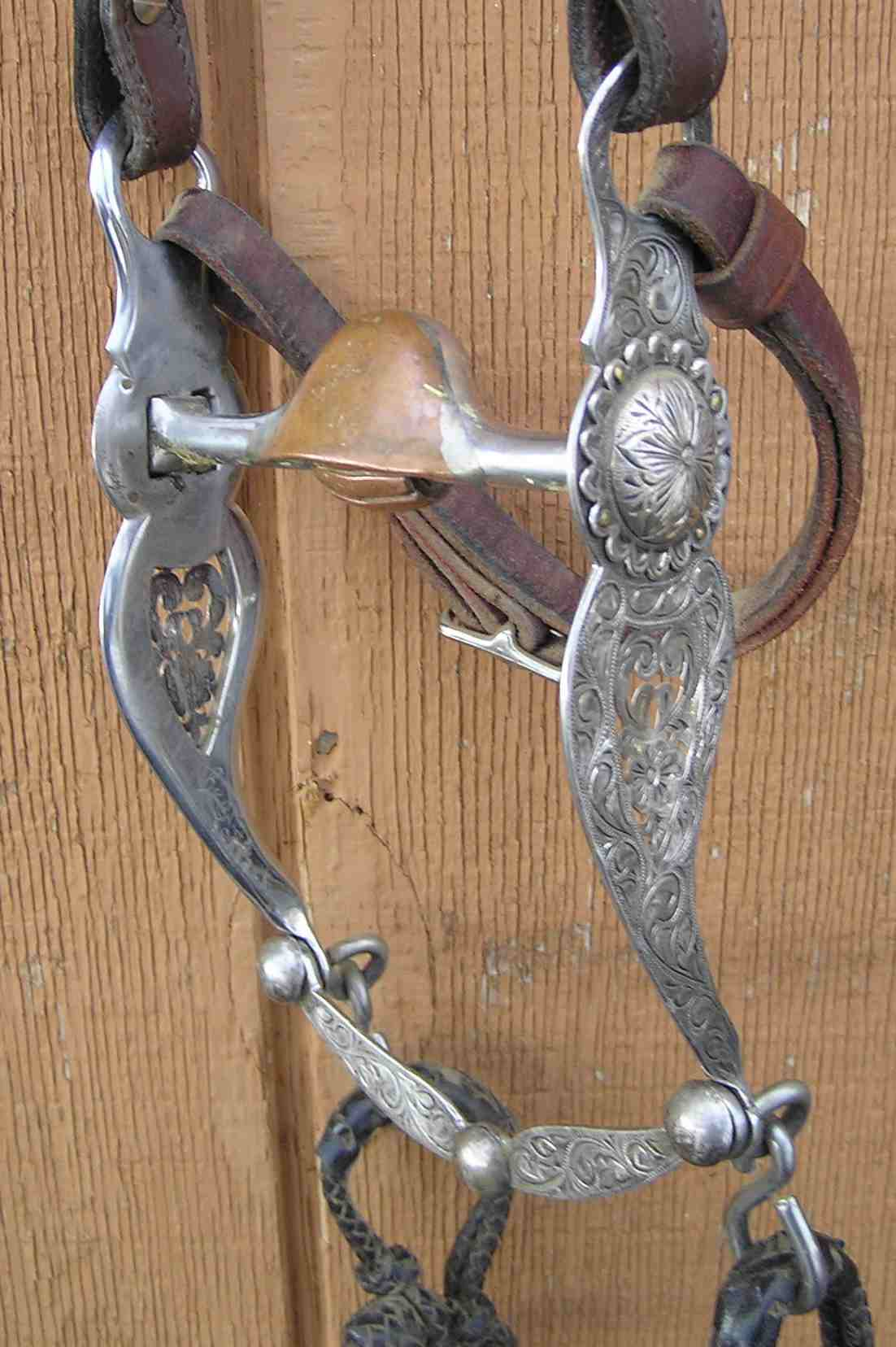
A decorative fixed shank on a western Salinas-style curb bit

A curb bit is a leverage bit, meaning that it multiplies the pressure applied by the rider. Unlike a snaffle bit, which applies direct rein pressure from the rider's hand to the horse's mouth, the curb can amplify rein pressure several times over, depending on the length of the curb's bit shank. Shank sizes vary from the Tom Thumb (2 inches long) to more than 5 inches. The longer the bit shank, the more powerful its potential effect on the horse. For this reason, overall shank or cheek length, from the top of the cheek ring to the bottom of the rein ring, usually cannot exceed 8 1/2 inches for most horse show disciplines, as the moment even light rein pressure is applied, it is amplified and the horse feels the pressure as much as it would if the rider was pulling on the reins quite hard.

=== Leverage principles ===
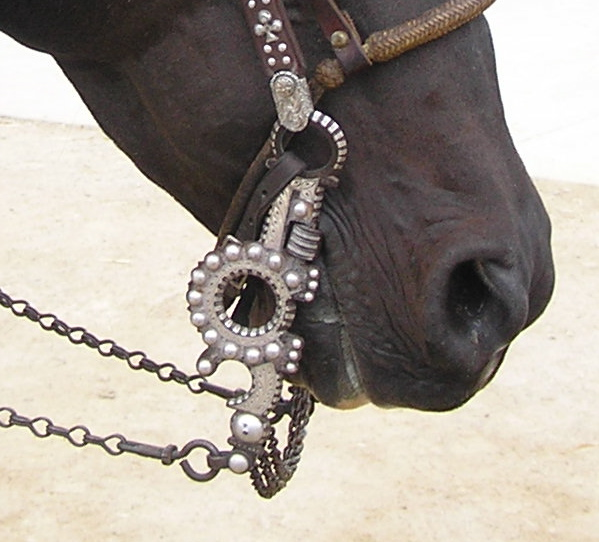
Bit shanks, such as those on this spade bit, work as a lever

The relation of the upper shank (purchase)—the shank length from the mouthpiece to the cheekpiece rings—and the lower shank or lever arm—the shank length from the mouthpiece to the lowest rein ring, is important in the severity of the bit. The standard curb bit has a 1 1/2" purchase and a 4 1/2" lower shank, thus producing a 1:3 ratio of purchase to lower shank, a 1:4 ratio of purchase to full shank, thus producing 3 lbs of pressure on the chin groove and 4 lbs of pressure on the horse's mouth for every 1 lb placed on the reins (3 and 4 newtons respectively for every newton).

Regardless of the ratio, the longer the shank, the less force is needed on the reins to provide a given amount of pressure on the mouth. So, if one were to apply 1 lb of pressure on the horse's mouth, a 2" shank would need more rein pressure than an 8" shank to provide the same effect.

A long lower shank in relation to the upper shank (or purchase) increases the leverage, and thus the pressure, on the curb groove and the bars of the mouth. A long purchase in relation to the lower shank increases the pressure on the poll and chin, but does not apply as much pressure on the bars of the mouth. A longer purchase will also lift the cannons up and cause significant lip stretch, with an increased danger of dragging the cannons of the bit into the premolars.

A horse has more warning or pre-signal, in a long-shanked bit, allowing it to respond before any significant pressure is applied to its mouth, than it would in a shorter-shanked bit, but ultimately it is the straightness or curve of the shank which translates to the abruptness of response. A straight shank, following the line of leverage, will produce a faster response in the mouth and curb than a shorter curved shank. In this way, a longer shank can allow better communication between horse and rider, without increasing severity. This is also directly dependent on the tightness of the curb chain. Pre-signal is everything that happens before the curbstrap engages, so a properly adjusted curbstrap is paramount in determining the amount of rotation and the timeframe a horse has to prepare for the bit to engage. Too tight and the action is abrupt and severe, too loose and the action is slower, but the bit rotates further, causing it to lift in the mouth and hit the premolars.

=== Types ===
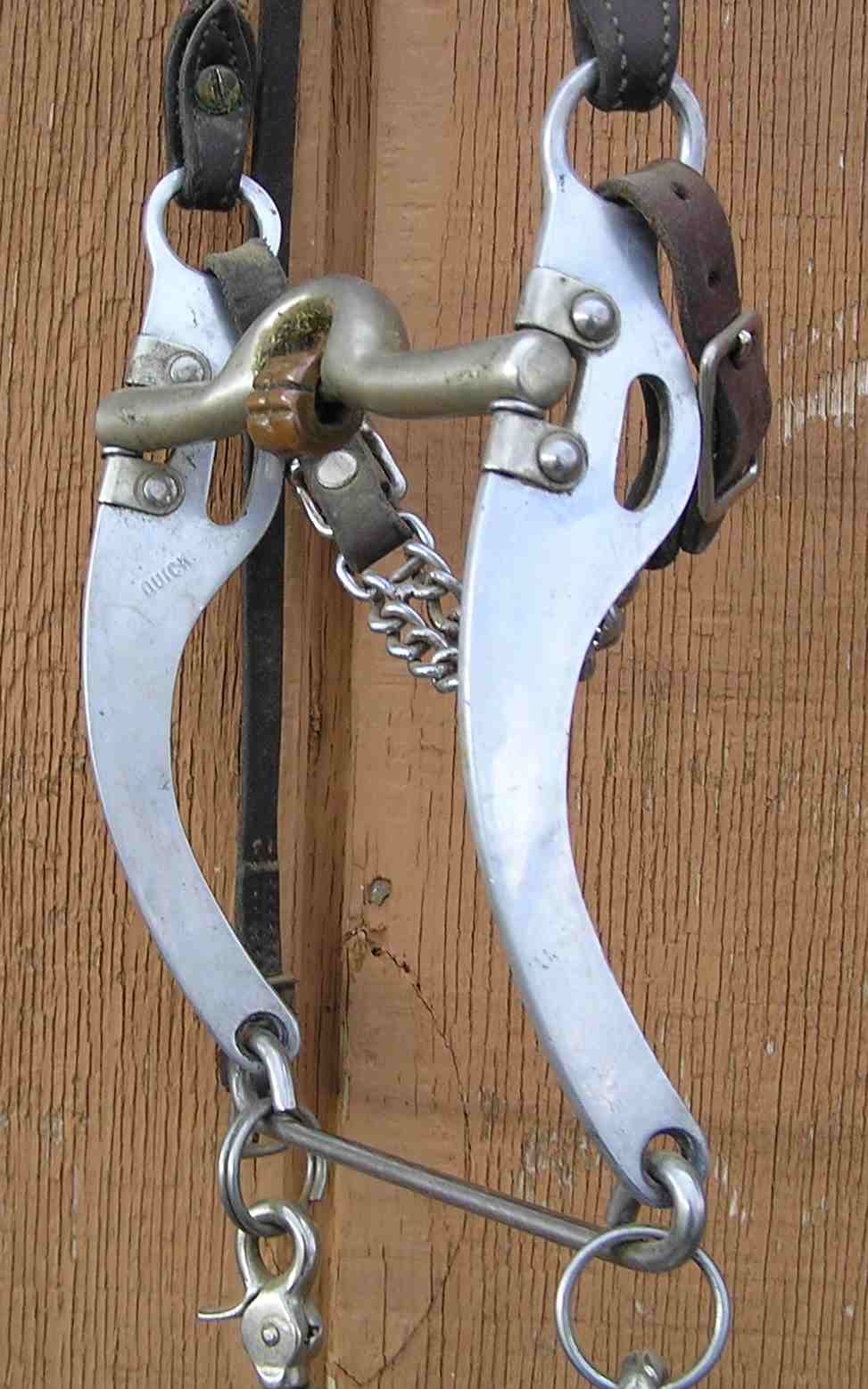
A western curb bit with a loose-jawed shank

Shanks come in a variety of types, which may affect the action of the bit. Some shanks are loose-jawed, meaning they swivel where the mouthpiece attaches to the shank. Others have a loose, rotating ring at the bottom of the shank for rein attachment. Both of these functions allow slight rotation before the bit engages, again providing a "warning" to the horse before the bit engages fully and allowing him to respond to the slightest pressure, thus increasing communication between horse and rider.

The cheek-shank angle also varies, with some straight up and down, others with the shanks curving backward, and some with an S-curve in the shank. The straighter the cheek-shank line is, the less signal is provided to the horse before the bit engages. Those that curve backward provide more of a signal to the horse. Therefore, the type of shank needs to be considered according to the use of the horse. Horses that maintain a more vertical head position, such as dressage horses, generally use a curb bit with straight shanks. Those that have a nose-out head position when working, such as cutting and roping horses, more commonly use a curved shank.

== Mouthpiece ==
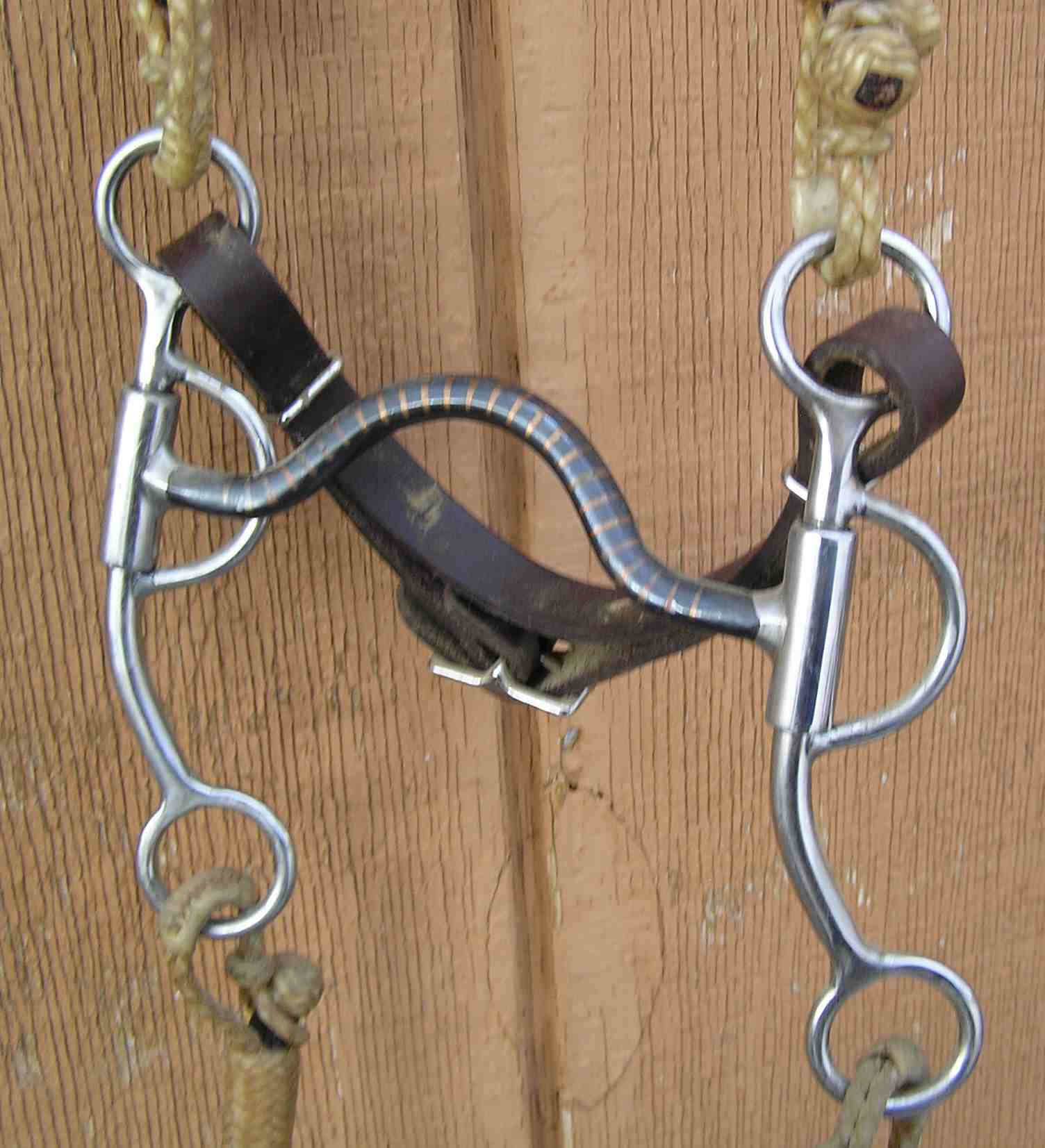
A medium port curb offers considerable tongue relief. The addition of loose-jaw short shanks make this a relatively mild bit.

The curb bit's mouthpiece controls the pressure on the tongue, roof of the mouth, and bars. A mullen mouth places even pressure on the bars and tongue. A port places more pressure on the bars, but provides room for the tongue. A high port may act on the roof of the mouth as it touches. Some Western style curbs, particularly the spade bit, have both a straight bar mouthpiece and a high welded port, thus acting on the bars, tongue and palate. In the wrong hands, such bits can be extremely severe, but on an exquisitely trained animal, they allow the rider to communicate with the horse with a simple touch of the fingertips to the reins.

Curb bits can also be purchased with a variety of jointed mouthpieces that are sometimes mistakenly called "snaffles", some of which (like the twisted wire) can further increase severity. Jointed mouthpieces increase the pressure on the bars due to the nutcracker action of the mouthpiece. In addition, the joint angle is altered by the shank leverage to tip the bit downward and into the tongue. These bits, sometimes called "cowboy snaffles" due to their popularity among western riders, are actually more harsh than a curb with a simple, solid, ported mouthpiece.

== Accessories ==
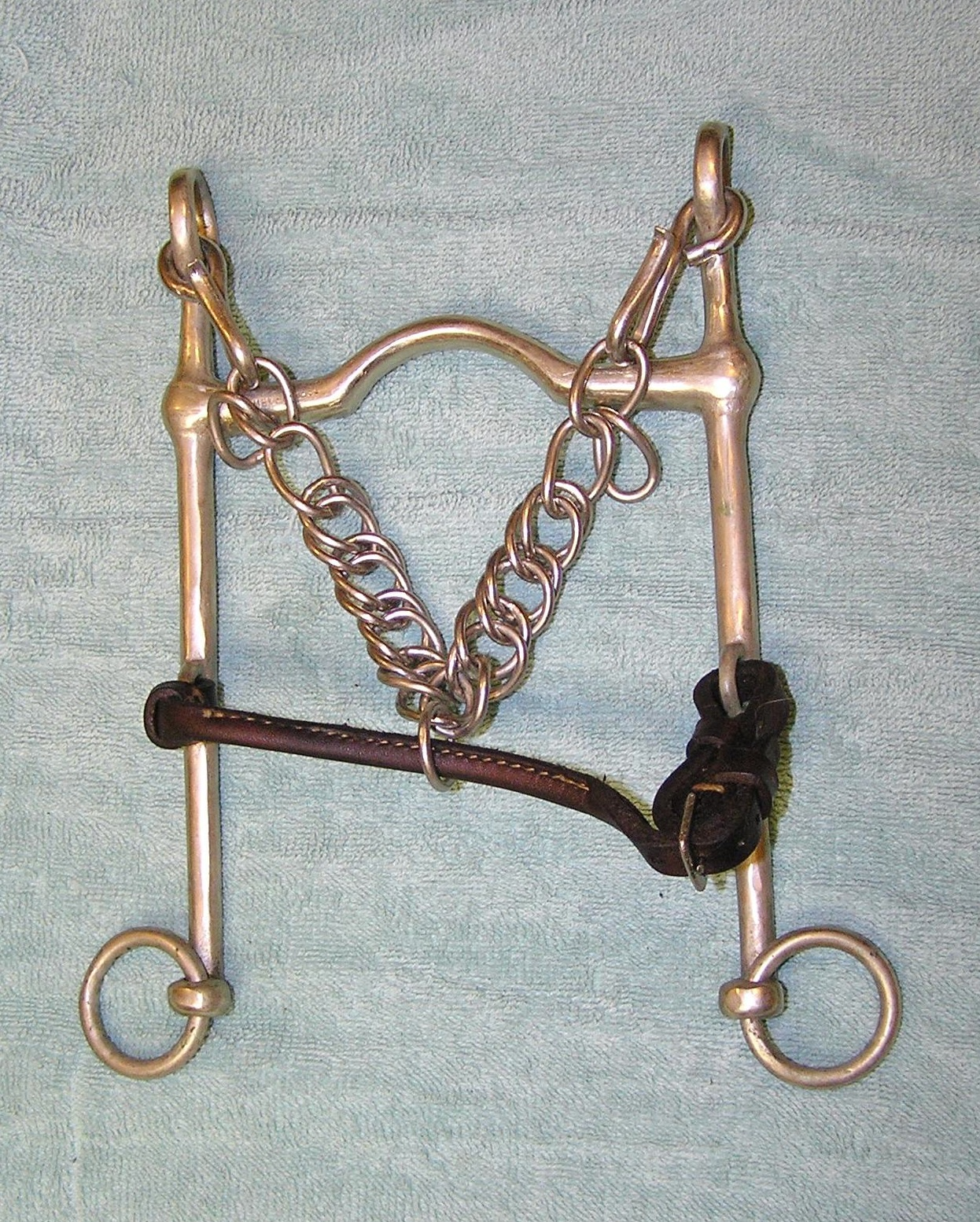
English curb set up with curb chain and lip strap

The curb chain or strap applies pressure to the curb groove under a horse's chin. When the shank of the bit rotates back (due to rein pressure), the cheek of the bit rotates forward since it is a lever arm. The curb chain is attached to the rings at the end of the cheek. So as the cheek moves forward, it pulls the curb chain, tightening in the curb groove. Once it comes in contact with the curb groove of the horse it acts as a fulcrum, causing the cannons of the bit mouthpiece to push down onto the horse's bars, thus amplifying the bit's pressure on the bars of the horse's mouth.

The action of the bit is therefore also dependent on the tightness of the curb chain. If the bit is used without a curb chain (very uncommon—and dangerous), it loses its leverage action. If used with a loose curb chain, it allows the shanks to rotate more before the curb chain is tight enough to act as a fulcrum and exert pressure. This extra rotation can warn the horse before pressure is exerted on the mouth, so the well-trained horse may respond faster. If used with a very tight curb chain, the bit immediately exerts leverage and increased pressure on the bars as soon as pressure is applied to the reins. Therefore, a tight curb chain is harsher, and provides less finesse in signaling the horse than a looser curb chain would.

Less often seen is the lip strap, a thin strap or light chain that helps keep the curb chain in place and also prevents the horse from grabbing, or "lipping" the bit shanks with its mouth.

== Styles ==
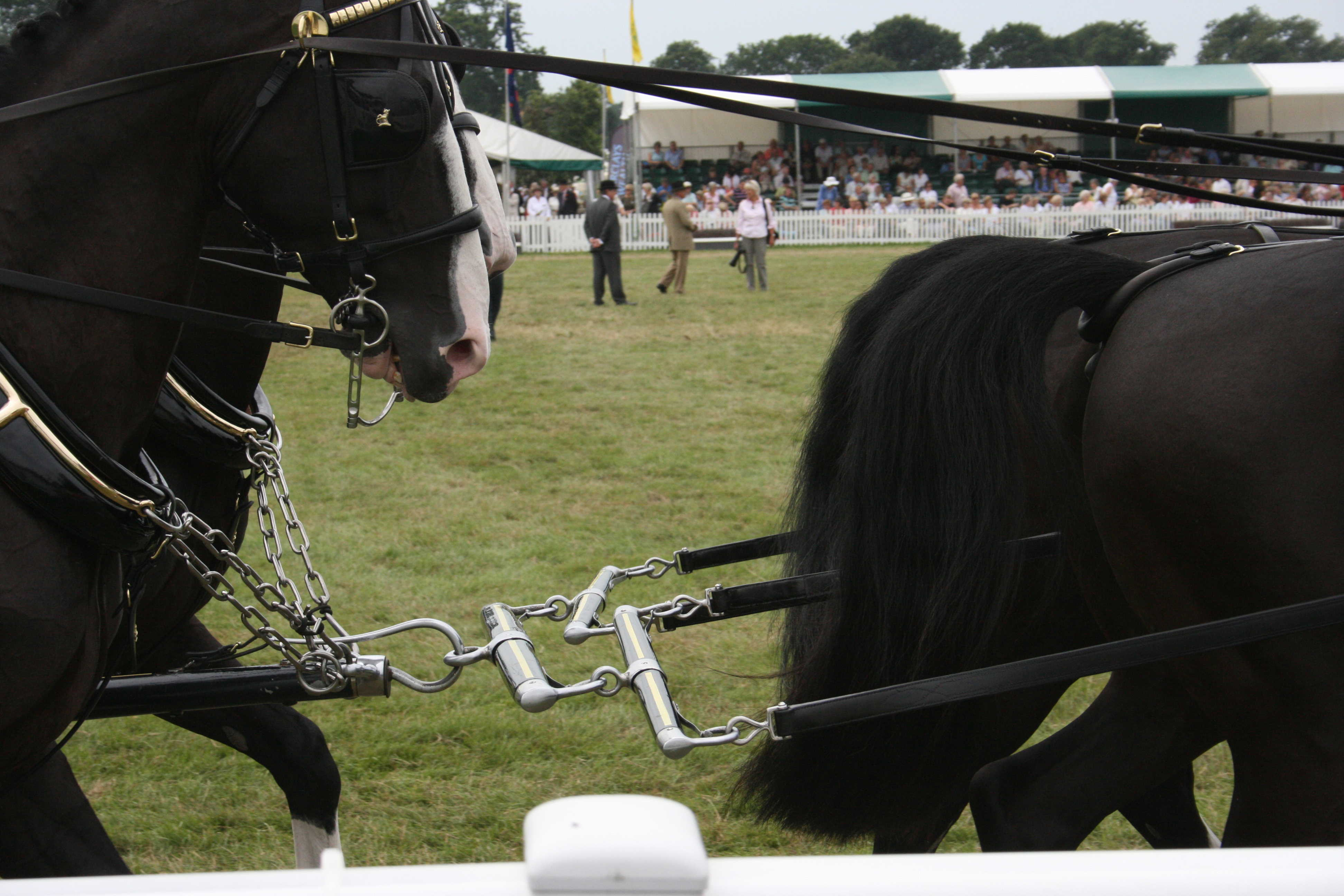
A carriage team's wheeler, in a Liverpool bit set up with minimum leverage. The leaders' two pairs of reins can also be seen being joined into one balanced pair.

Curb bits have tremendous variation, from the relatively simple English Weymouth curb or the simple western medium-port curb to very elaborate designs with complex mouthpieces and shank designs. Some of the more common include:

- Weymouth or Weymouth curb: commonly used in a double bridle. It is an English style with a straight shank. The mouthpiece can be one of numerous styles, but usually it is solid, with a low port.
- Grazing bit: A western curb with shanks turned back nearly 90 degrees, allegedly to allow the horse to graze while wearing a curb bit. Modern western bits with moderately curved or angled shanks are sometimes called grazing bits, even if the angle is less extreme than the original design.
- Spade bit: A historic vaquero design with straight, highly decorated shanks and a mouthpiece that includes a straight bar, a narrow port with a cricket, and a "spoon," a flat, partly rounded plate affixed above the port, supported by braces on either side. Considered a highly technical piece of equipment to be used only on a finished horse.
- Liverpool bit: A curb bit with several rein-attachment slots on the curb arms, giving a choice of leverage – the reins may alternatively be attached directly to the bit to use it as a simple snaffle. Used for horses in harness, especially when working in teams, when different horses may require different treatment – their bits can be adjusted so the same tension on the reins of each horse gives a similar result. This allows the reins of the different horses in a team to be joined together, minimising the number of reins the driver has to manage.

== Fitting ==
Curbs are generally placed lower down in a horse's mouth than snaffle bits, touching the corners of the mouth, or creating a single slight wrinkle in the lips. The lower the bit is placed, the more severe it is as the bars of the mouth get thinner and pressure is more concentrated.

The curb chain should be adjusted correctly, lying flat against the chin groove and only coming into action against the jaw when the shank is rotated, but not so loose that the shank exceeds 45 degrees of rotation.

== References and external links ==
- The Bit Gallery
