= Rein =

Straps used to direct a horse

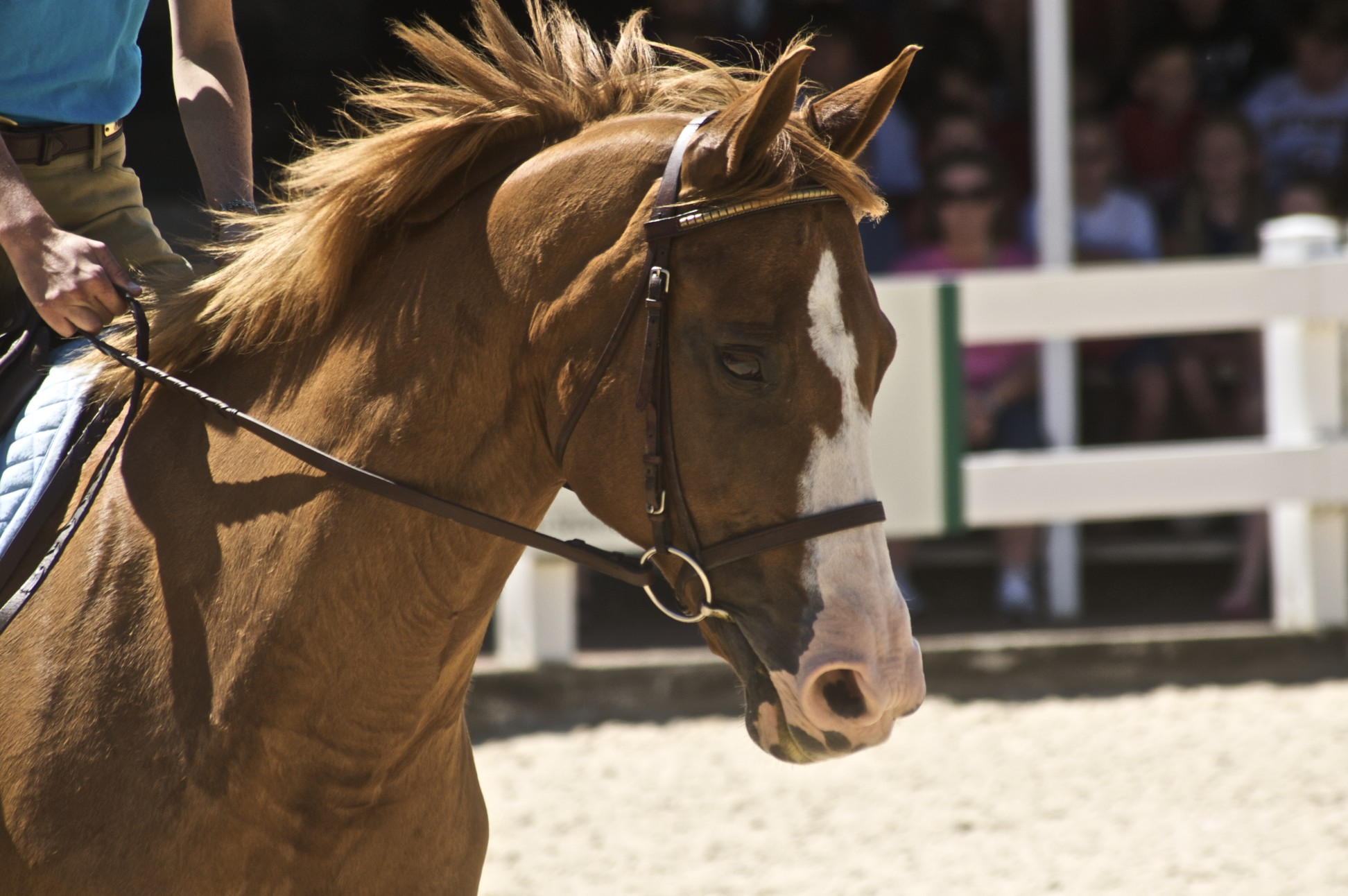
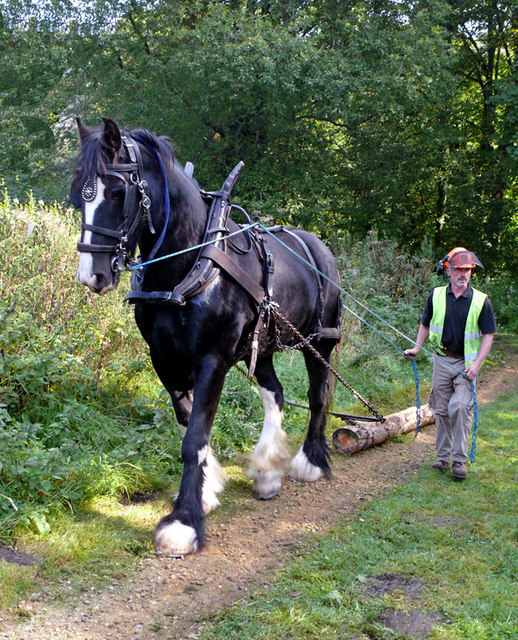
Riding reins (top); driving reins (bottom)

Reins are used to direct a horse (or other animal) when riding or driving. They are attached to a bridle's bit or noseband and are made of leather, nylon, or other materials. Reins are used to give subtle commands or cues—also known as rein aids—to ask for a turn, a slower speed, a halt, or to go backwards.

== Types ==
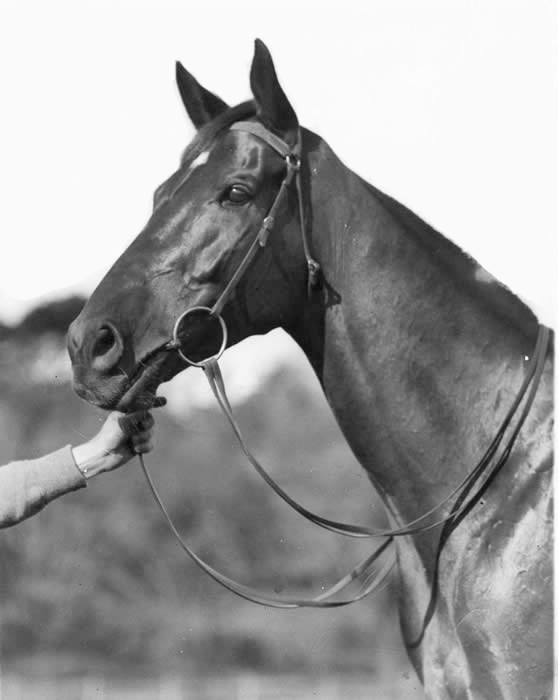
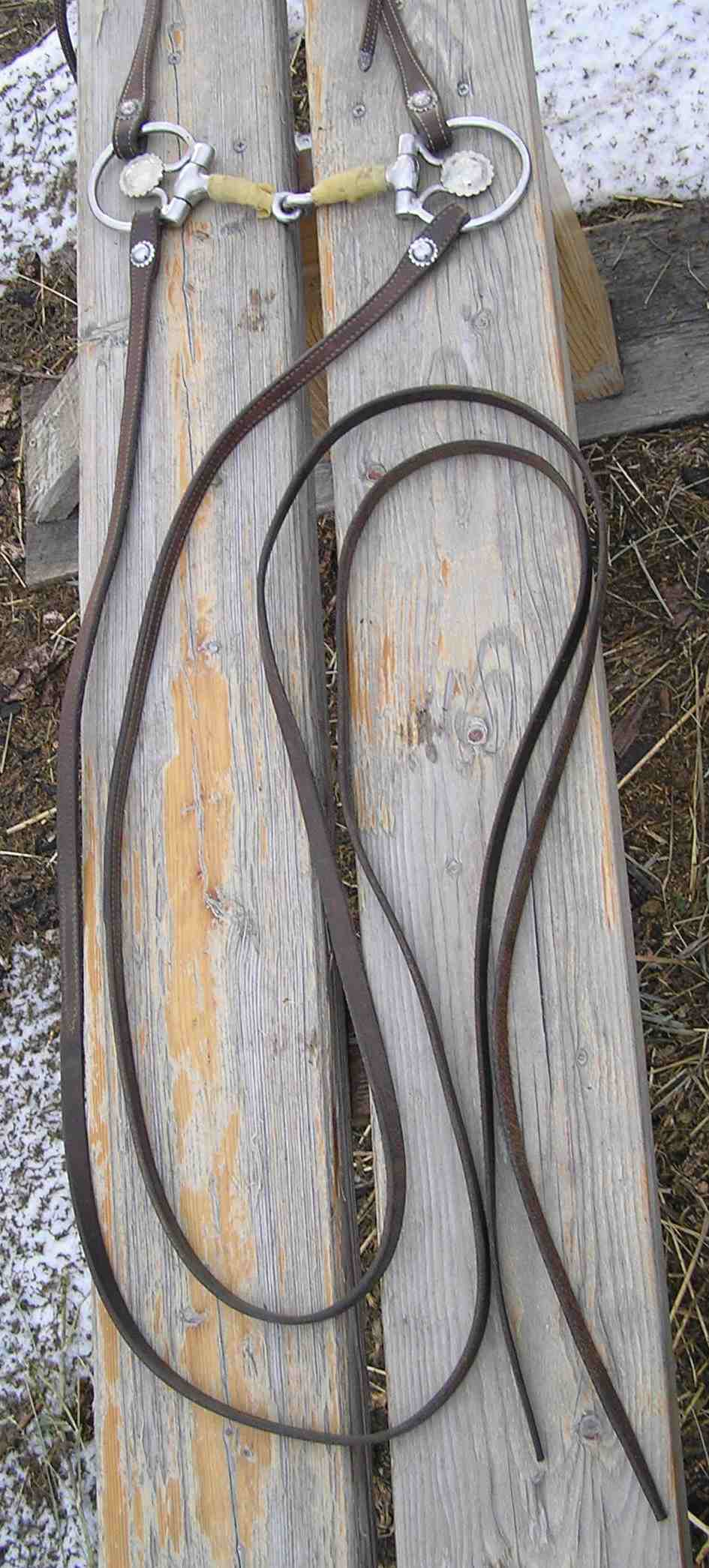
A closed rein (left) will stay looped over the horse's neck; split reins (right).

Closed reins or loop reins
Reins that are either a single piece or are sewn or buckled together. English riders usually use closed reins. Western riders in timed rodeo events use a single closed rein, as do those who use a romal. A closed rein helps prevent the rider losing the reins altogether when dropping them.
Split reins
A rein style seen in western riding where the reins are not attached to one another at the ends. They prevent a horse from tangling its feet in a looped rein, particularly when the rider is dismounted. They are considerably longer than closed reins.
Double reins
The combined use of two sets of reins, a curb rein and a snaffle rein. Double reins are used with a double bridle, with bits such as the Pelham bit and, less often, on some gag bits used for polo.
Draw reins and running reins
Long reins, usually made of leather or nylon webbing, that attach to the saddle or the girth, run through the bit rings, and back to the rider. Several design variations, they add mechanical advantage to the rider's hands and may affect the horse's ability to raise or lower its head. Often used in conjunction with a snaffle rein by English riders, usually used alone by western riders.
Driving reins
Driving reins are often 13 feet or longer, and reins are supported by rings on the harness called terrets. When driving a pair of horses harnessed side-by-side, the reins from each horse are joined midway so the driver holds just two reins. A driver may be on a vehicle or on the ground walking beside or behind the horse.
Lead rein
A third rein used on bridles, not to be confused with the single lead rope of a halter nor the direct rein aid also known as the "leading rein". In North America a third rein is most commonly seen as part of the mecate of a hackamore. In Mongolia it is integral to the bridle, and tied to either a bit ring or a chin strap.
Long reins, long lines
Long reins allow the rider to control the horse from the ground, with the handler walking behind or beside the horse.
Mecate rein
A style of rein seen on a bosal style hackamore made of a single piece of rope that encompasses both a closed rein and a leading rope.
Romal reins
A rein style from the vaquero tradition that incorporates a closed rein with a long quirt at the end.
Side reins
Used when longeing a horse, attached from the bit to the saddle or surcingle, they are not meant to be held by the rider.

== Other uses ==
The word "rein" is sometimes used incorrectly to refer to a lead rope or a longe line, neither of which are reins.

The idiom "rein in" means to hold back, slow down, control or limit, while in contrast "free rein" means to give or allow complete freedom, in action and decision, over something. Both are commonly misspelled as "reign in" and "free reign".

While reins are used on reindeer, the "rein-" in "reindeer" is not derived from the word "rein".

== See also ==
- Horse tack
- Neck rein
- Riding aids
