= Pelham bit =

Horse tack

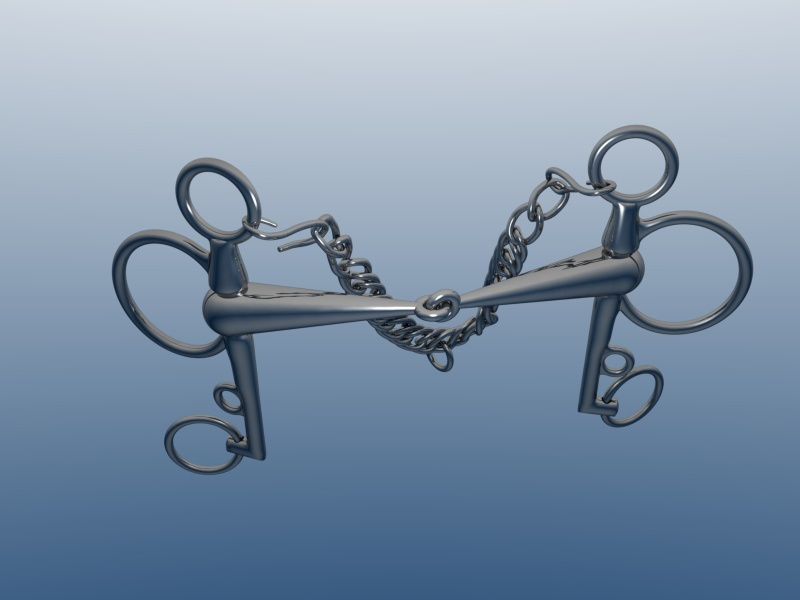
Pelham bit with curb chain and jointed mouthpiece

A pelham bit is a type of bit used when riding a horse. It has elements of both a curb bit and a snaffle bit. In this respect a pelham bit functions similar to a double bridle, and like a double bridle it normally has "double" reins: a set of curb reins and a set of snaffle reins. Because it has a bit shank and can exert curb-style pressure on the horse, it is considered a curb bit. Like all curb bits, a pelham bit has a mouthpiece, shanks with both purchase and lever arms, a ring for rein attachment at the bottom of the shank, and a curb chain. But like a snaffle bit, a pelham bit also has a bit ring on either side of the mouthpiece. Like some curb bits, a pelham bit usually has "loose" shanks - hinged at the mouthpiece in the same way that the rings of a snaffle bit are hinged. When two sets of reins are used, the snaffle rein generally is wider, to help distinguish it from the curb. A "cowboy pelham" is a western style of loose-jawed curb bit with additional rings at the mouthpiece allowing a second set of reins to be added.

== Action ==
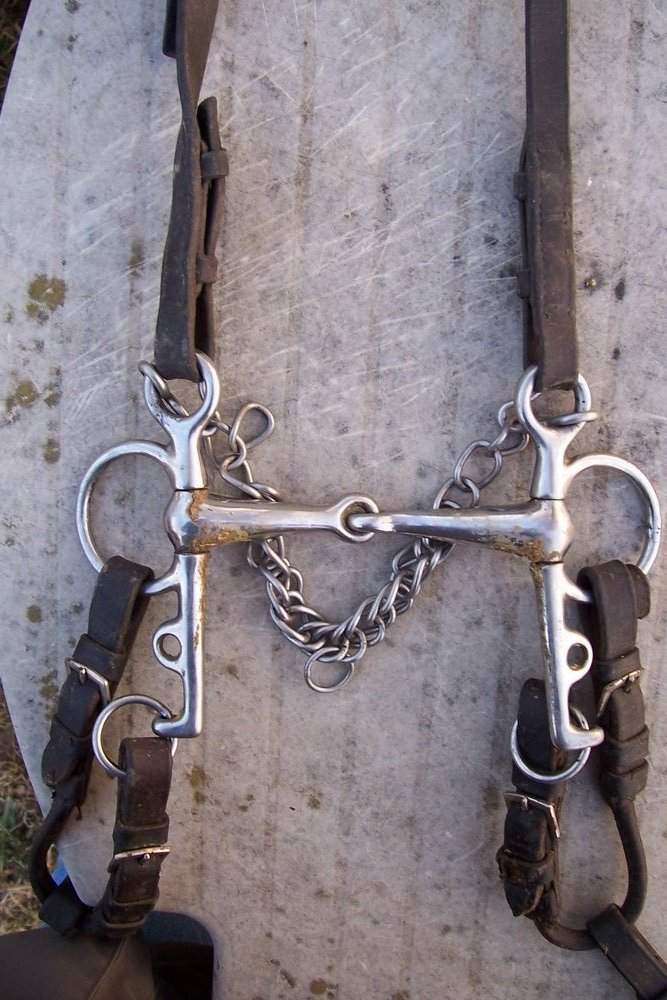
Pelham bit, jointed mouthpiece, used here with a bit converter and single rein

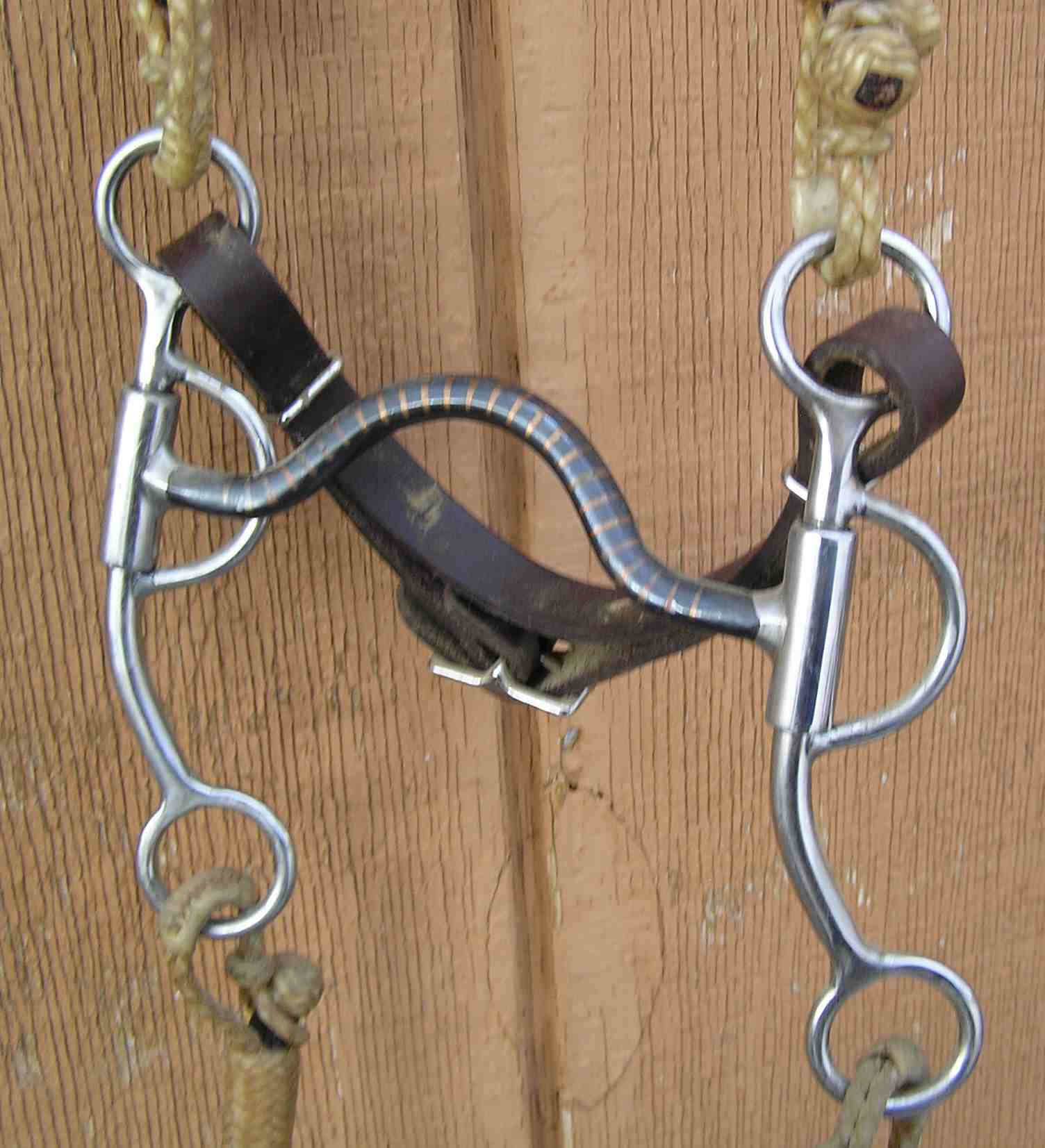
A solid medium-port mouthpiece with ring for a snaffle rein, allowing it to be used as a "cowboy pelham", though shown here with only a single curb rein

A pelham works on several parts of a horse's head, depending on which rein is applied. The mouthpiece acts when either the snaffle or curb rein is applied and puts pressure on the bars, tongue, and lips of the horse. The curb chain and design of the mouthpiece can alter the degree of pressure placed on the horse's mouth. The roof of the mouth is affected if the bit mouthpiece of the pelham has a high port or if it is jointed. Pressure on the poll occurs when the curb rein is engaged, and pressure is directly related to the length of the upper shank (purchase arm) in relation to the lower shank (lever arm). All pelhams apply some pressure on the poll. Pressure is applied to the chin groove by the curb chain when the curb rein is used. Direct rein pressure from the snaffle rein may put some pressure on the sides of the horse's mouth, depending on the specific bit design.

=== Shank ===
A pelham is a leverage bit, meaning that it increases the force but reduces the extent of movement applied by the rider. Unlike a snaffle bit, the curb rein can amplify the rein pressure several times over, depending on the geometry and length of the shank. Shank lengths are 2 inches (5.1 cm) ("Tom Thumb") and longer, although most are less than 4 inches (10 cm).

The relation of the purchase arm—the length from the mouthpiece to the cheekpiece rings—and the "shank" or lever arm—the length from the mouthpiece to the lowest rein ring, is important in the severity of the bit. A long lower shank in relation to the upper shank increases the leverage, and thus the pressure, on the curb groove and the bars of the mouth. A long upper shank in relation to the lower shank increases the pressure on the poll, but does not apply as much pressure on the bars of the mouth.

However, longer-shanked bits must rotate back further before applying pressure on the horse's mouth than shorter-shanked bits. Therefore, the horse has more warning in a long-shanked bit, allowing it to respond before any significant pressure is applied to its mouth, than it would in a shorter-shanked bit. In this way, a longer shank can allow better communication between horse and rider, without increasing severity. This is also directly dependent on the tightness of the curb chain.

If the bit has a 1.5" cheek and a 4.5" lower shank, thus producing a 1:3 ratio of cheek to lower shank, while the ratio of the cheek to (upper + lower) shank is 1:4, and producing 4 pounds-force of pressure on the horse's mouth for every 1 pound-force (4 newtons per newton) placed on the reins. If the bit had 2" cheeks and 8" shank (ratio of 1:4), the bit will produce 5 lbf (22 N) of tension for every one applied by the reins (5 N/N). Regardless of the ratio, the longer the shank, the less force is needed on the reins to provide a given amount of pressure on the mouth. So, if one were to apply 1 lbf (4.4 N) of pressure on the horse's mouth, a 2" shank would need much more rein pressure than an 8" shank to provide the same effect.

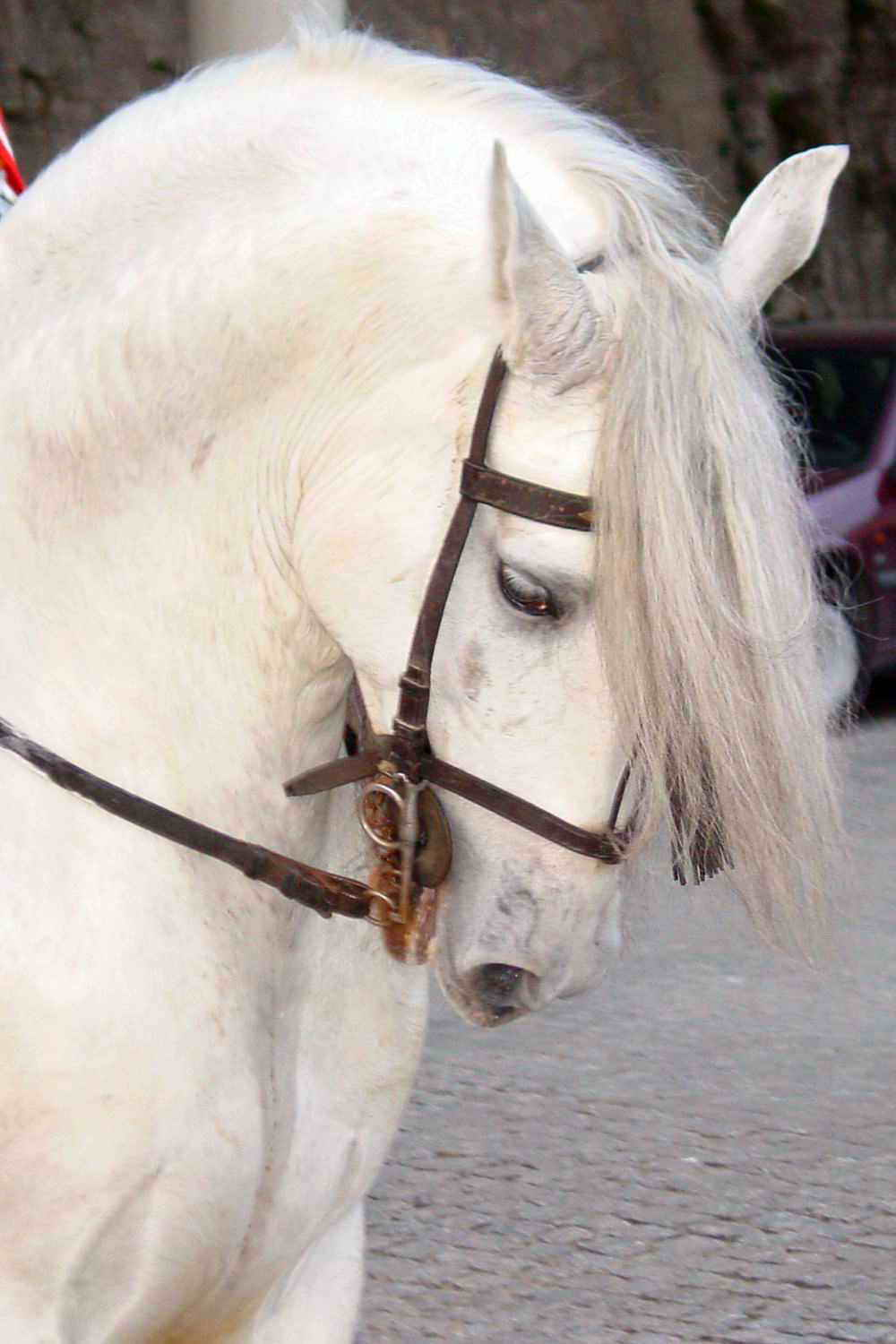
This pelham bit, used without a snaffle rein, is essentially a curb bit

=== Mouthpiece ===
As with many other bits, a pelham may have a solid or a jointed mouthpiece. If solid, it may range from a nearly straight "Mullen" mouthpiece up to a medium port. The pelham's mouthpiece controls the pressure on the tongue, roof of the mouth, and bars. A mullen mouth places even pressure on the bars and tongue. A port places more pressure on the bars, and provide room for the tongue. A high port may act on the roof of the mouth as it touches, and will act as a fulcrum, amplifying the pressure on the bars of the mouth.

Jointed mouthpieces increase the pressure on the bars as the mouthpiece breaks over in a "nutcracker" effect. Unlike a jointed mouthpiece on a snaffle bit, a jointed mouthpiece on a bit with shanks, such as the pelham, can be quite severe in its effect, particularly if the pressure from the shanks causes the joint of the bit to roll forward and press the tip of the joint into the tongue.

The mouthpiece is placed lower down in a horse's mouth than snaffle bits, usually just touching the corners of the mouth without creating a wrinkle. The lower the bit is placed, the more severe it is as the bars of the mouth get thinner and so pressure is more concentrated.

=== Curb chain ===
The curb chain applies pressure to the groove under a horse's chin. It amplifies the pressure on the bars of the horse's mouth, because when it tightens it acts as a fulcrum.

Adjusted correctly, the chain links lie flat and hang loose below the chin groove, coming into action against the jaw only when the shanks have rotated due to rein pressure. The point at which the curb chain engages varies with the individual needs of the horse, but contact at 45 degrees of shank rotation is a common default adjustment.

== Uses ==
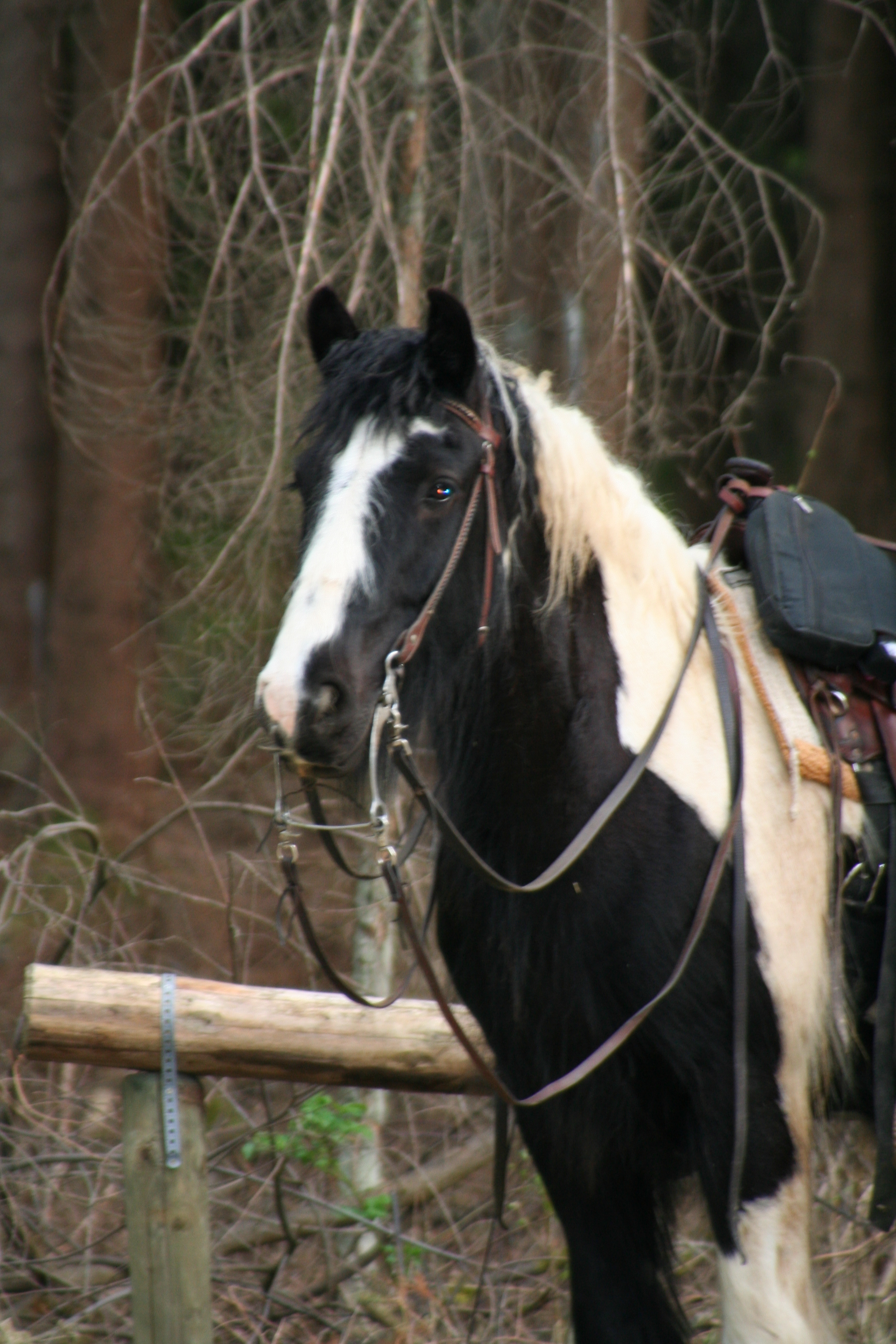
Western-style bit used as a "cowboy pelham" with double reins

The pelham bit has several uses. In the English riding disciplines, it is used in place of a double bridle, when it is desirable to have double reins but not two bits. The pelham bit is also used for polo, when the action of a double bridle is desired, but the rider's ability to make rein adjustments is limited. In training, a pelham bit sometimes is used in both English and western disciplines to transition a horse from a snaffle bit to a curb bit or double bridle.

Sometimes, a bit converter, also known as a pelham rounding, is used so a pelham can be used with one pair of reins. This is most often seen with beginners and for riders in the cross-country phase of eventing. However, use of a converter is illegal in most other horse show classes.

=== Horse shows ===
In horse shows, a pelham bit may be used in some disciplines but is prohibited in others. In the United States, use of a pelham bit is prevalent in hunt seat equitation, and occasionally in show jumping and eventing. Use of this bit is legal, but not common, in show hunter, and English pleasure. In the United Kingdom, this bit is often used in place of a double bridle in show hunter, show hack, riding horse, show cob and mountain and moorland classes, but it is forbidden in equitation and novice classes. The pelham is not permitted in dressage at any level. The pelham is never legal for use in any western riding discipline, where either a snaffle bit or a curb bit is used.

=== Driving ===
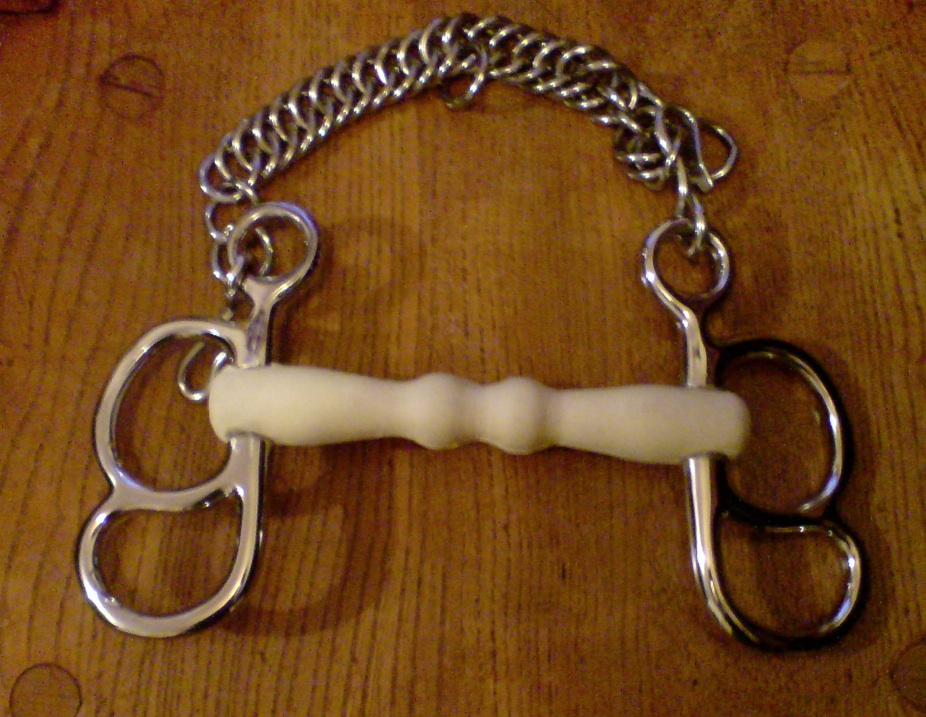
A pelham with synthetic mouthpiece, designed for driving

Variations of the pelham bit are often seen in driving in situations where a bit more control is required that can be obtained with a snaffle alone or with a combination of snaffle and overcheck. Shank designs and size are governed by the rules for various forms of competition and very considerably across disciplines from combined driving to draft horse showing.

=== Polo ===
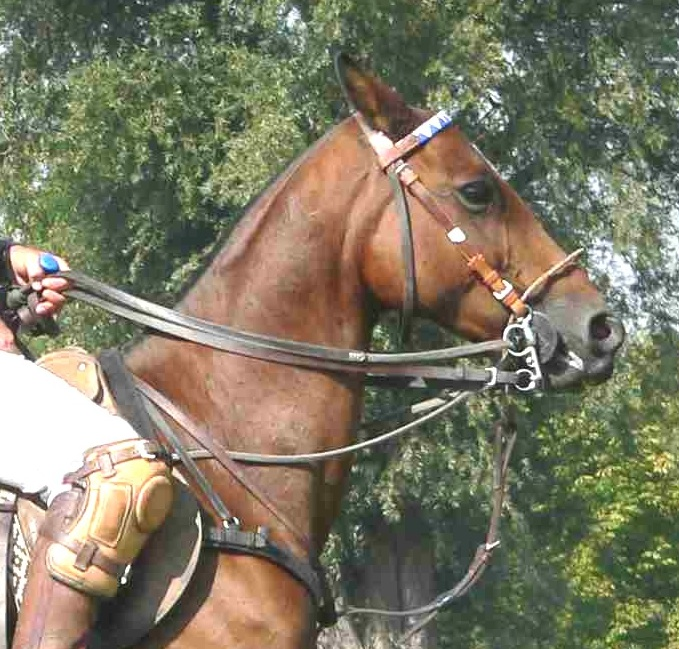
Pelham bit on a polo pony, with double reins, draw reins on the snaffle rings, and a martingale

In polo, a pelham bit is one of the two bits most commonly used (the other being a gag bit). Double reins are held in one hand. Neck reining is used almost exclusively, and riders have little or no need to adjust the reins while riding. Draw reins are commonly used, on the snaffle ring. The rein lengths are adjusted so that the rein used normally is the snaffle rein, with the curb rein only coming into effect when needed. Such techniques are not legal in show disciplines and are exclusive to polo.

== History ==
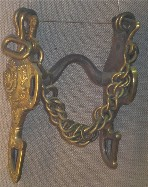
An antique curb bit with pelham rein attachment points

The angle cheek pelham was formerly used in the Australian Light Horse and other cavalry units as it was designed to suit as many horses' mouths as possible. The Australian design had one side of the mouthpiece smooth and the other serrated. Various rein attachments were also possible with this bit.
