= Riding horse (horse show) =

Type of show horse in the UK

The riding horse is a size class and type of show horse in the UK. Riding horses can be any breed, but are generally warmbloods or Thoroughbred crosses.

The breeding and showing of riding horses is overseen by the British Show Horse Association.

== Showing the riding horse ==
The riding horse is considered to combine the characteristics of the hack and a hunter types.

=== Division of classes ===
Riding horses are divided into two sections:

- Small riding horse: Mare or gelding four years old or over, exceeding 148 cm (14.2 hands high), but not exceeded to 158 cm (15.2 hands high).
- Large riding horse: Mare or gelding four years old or over, exceeding 158 cm (15.2 hands high).

=== Show ===
Classes are judged on type, ride, manners and conformation. Horses in the class are asked to perform a walk, trot, canter and (conditions permitting) gallop together.

The judge will then ride the horses and then may require individual performances, called "shows," from the competitors. Individual shows should not exceed 1 1/2 minutes, and should include walk, trot, canter, gallop, rein back, stand still and demonstrate obedience to the leg.

Riding horses can be shown ridden astride or sidesaddle.

=== Turnout ===
Riding horses are shown in brown tack, with a coloured browband. Double bridles or pelham bits are used. Saddles should be straight-cut to show off the animal's shoulder. (This style is called an "English showing saddle" in some places, to distinguish it from both the "Forward Seat" and the "Dressage" saddle). Manes should be plaited, tails pulled and legs and faces trimmed.

Riders should wear tweed jackets and riding hats, cream or buff breeches, a cream shirt with a tie and tall black riding boots. Show canes are generally carried.

For evening championships riders should wear a black or navy jacket with a white or cream stock, fastened with a pin, plus a top hat.

== Racehorse To Riding Horse ==
The Racehorse to Riding Horse class was introduced to the Horse of the Year Show in 2006. The format of the class is as for a traditional riding horse class, although horses which are good examples of a show hunter or show hack may also enter.

To be eligible, horses must be full thoroughbred and registered in the Weatherbys General Stud Book. The horse must have been in training as a racehorse, but need not necessarily have raced. They must also be over four years old, and stand taller than 15 hands high (hh).

Turnout and rider wear should conform to the appropriate class - competitors showing their horses as riding horses should wear navy jackets and hats, while those showing their horses as hunters should wear tweed jackets.

Competitors qualifying for the evening performance at the Horse Of The Year Show should wear black or navy jackets and a top hat.

== Comparable classes in other nations ==
The Riding horse class is roughly comparable to the English pleasure-type class known as "Hunter Under Saddle" in the United States, though in the USA judges do not ride the horses nor are they asked to perform individually.

== See also ==
- Equestrianism
- English riding
- Horse show
- Show hack
- Cob (horse)
