= English riding =

Form of horse riding

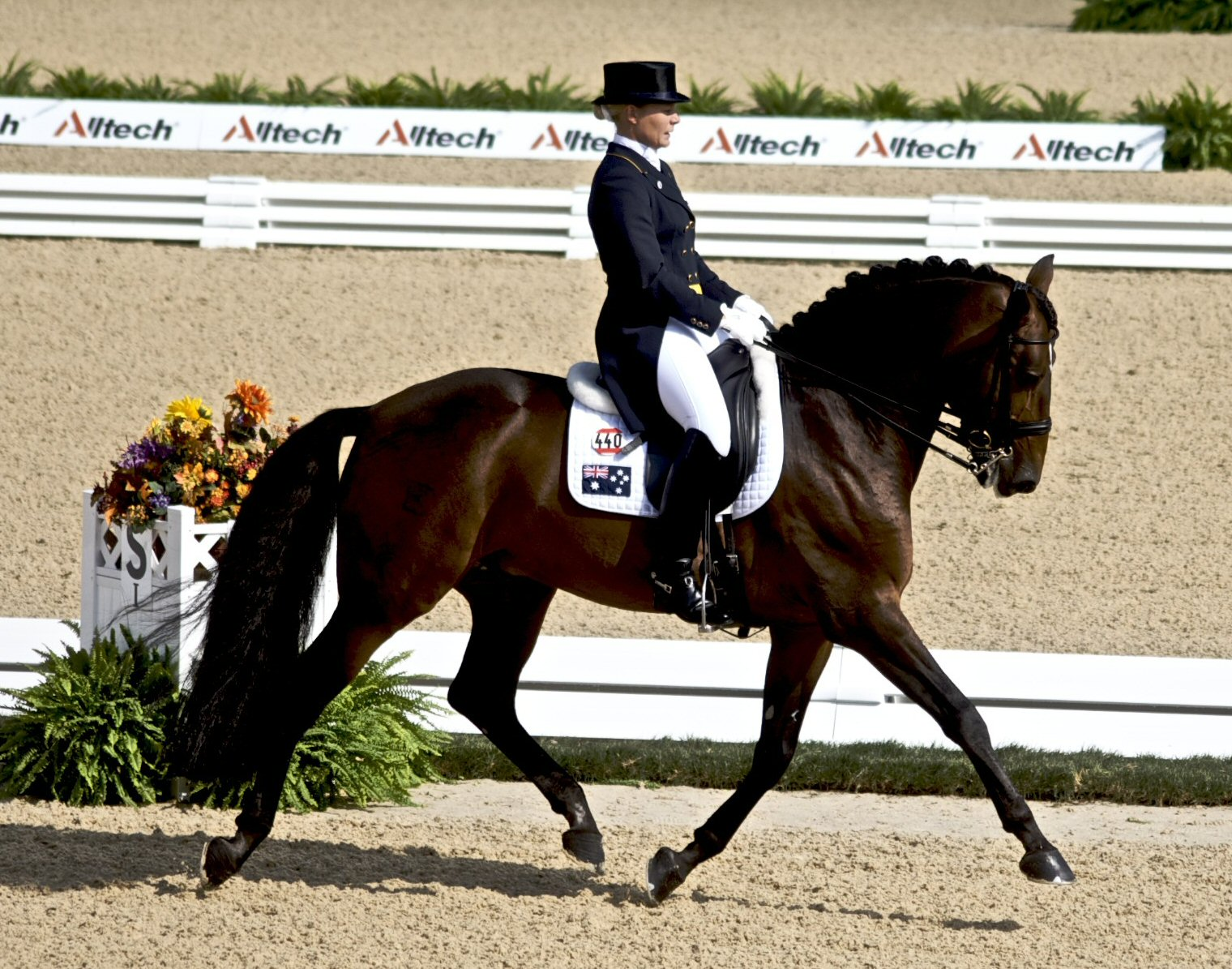
Dressage style English attire and tack in competition.

English riding is a form of horse riding seen throughout the world. There are many variations, but all feature a flat English saddle without the deep seat, high cantle, or saddle horn found on a Western saddle or the knee pads seen on an Australian stock saddle. Saddles within the various English disciplines are all designed to allow the horse the freedom to move in the optimal manner for a given task, ranging from classical dressage to horse racing. English bridles also vary in style on the basis of discipline, but most feature some type of noseband as well as closed reins, buckled together at the ends, that prevents them from dropping on the ground if a rider becomes unseated. Clothing for riders in competition is usually based on traditional needs from which a specific style of riding developed, but most standards require, at a minimum, tall riding boots or paddock boots; breeches or jodhpurs; a shirt with some form of tie or stock; a hat, cap, or equestrian helmet; and a jacket.

Although English riding, as an equestrian discipline, has many different styles, most versions even at a basic level require riders to use both hands on the reins, rather than just one hand, as is often seen in western riding. Riders generally "post" or "rise" to the trot (rising and sitting in rhythm with each stride). The "posting trot" is used most often in a working or extended trot, although there are also times when English riders may sit the trot, while the "sitting trot" is most often used to ride collected forms of the trot seen in dressage, show hack, and hunt seat equitation competition.

== Types ==
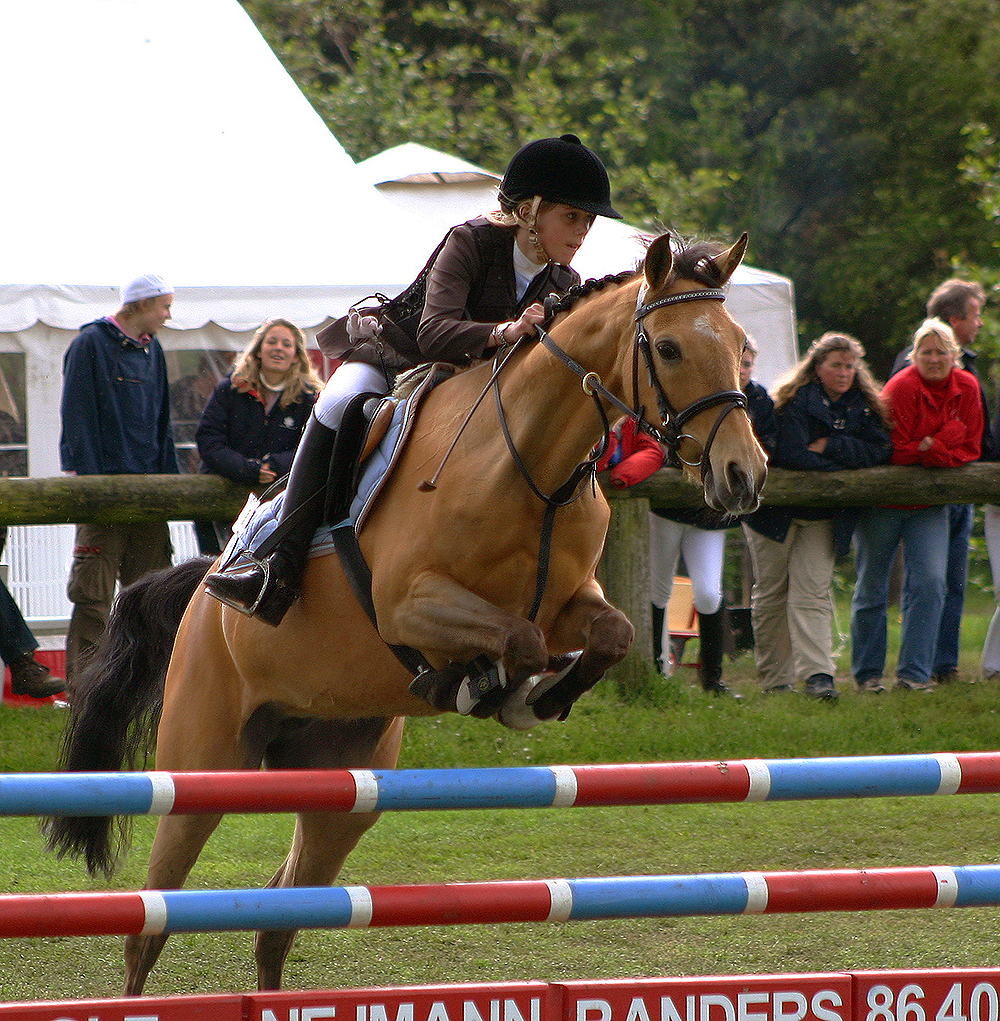
A youth rider in English style tack and equipment

English riding is promoted in organizations for youth, such as Pony Club, and is the basic style of riding seen in the various events at the Olympics. English saddles also are used by many pleasure riders for everyday riding. The major subdivisions of the English riding genre are:

=== International ===
Forms of competition and exhibition seen throughout the world. The competitions include dressage, endurance, eventing, horse racing, horseball, polo, polocrosse, show jumping, and tent pegging.

Forms
Name	Description
Dressage (Classical)	Dressage as practiced in historic times, with principles and goals similar to competitive dressage, but with different breeds of horses used, additional (and more difficult) haute ecole ("high school") skills developed, and seen today primarily in exhibition, rather than in competition. It is primarily associated with the Spanish Riding School of Vienna and similar programs.
Dressage (Contemporary)	a term meaning training, a form of both training and competition on the flat that emphasizes natural training of the horse to perform calmly and quietly in complete obedience to the rider. A recognized FEI and Olympic sport.
Dressage (Para-Equestrian)	similar to contemporary competitive dressage, but with a grading system separating disabled riders into different classes based on the severity of their disabilities. A recognized FEI and Paralympic sport.
Endurance riding	distance riding competition, wherein many styles of saddle are used, but English saddles are very common at international levels. A recognized FEI sport.
Eventing	competition that combines Dressage, cross-country jumping and show jumping, usually held over a three-day period. A recognized FEI and Olympic sport.
Horse racing	broadly speaking, a riding discipline that uses a very lightweight saddle based on an English design.
Horseball	often compared to "rugby on horseback", it involves two teams of four players each, who pass a ball from rider to rider and attempt to score by throwing the ball through a vertical hoop. A recognized FEI sport.
Polo	a team sport, which with the exception of western-style "cowboy polo," uses English-style equipment that is adapted for the sport.
Polocrosse	similar to polo with elements of Lacrosse added. Players use either English saddles or Australian equipment originally adapted from English tack.
Show jumping	competition over fences where scoring is entirely objective. Scoring is based on the time elapsed and on the number of obstacles cleared without knockdowns. It is a recognized FEI and Olympic sport.
Tent Pegging	a combat sport which has evolved from cavalry training drills, it involves a rider at a full gallop, on a timed course, using a lance or sword or other weapon, to hit a course of targets. It is a recognized FEI sport.

==== North America ====
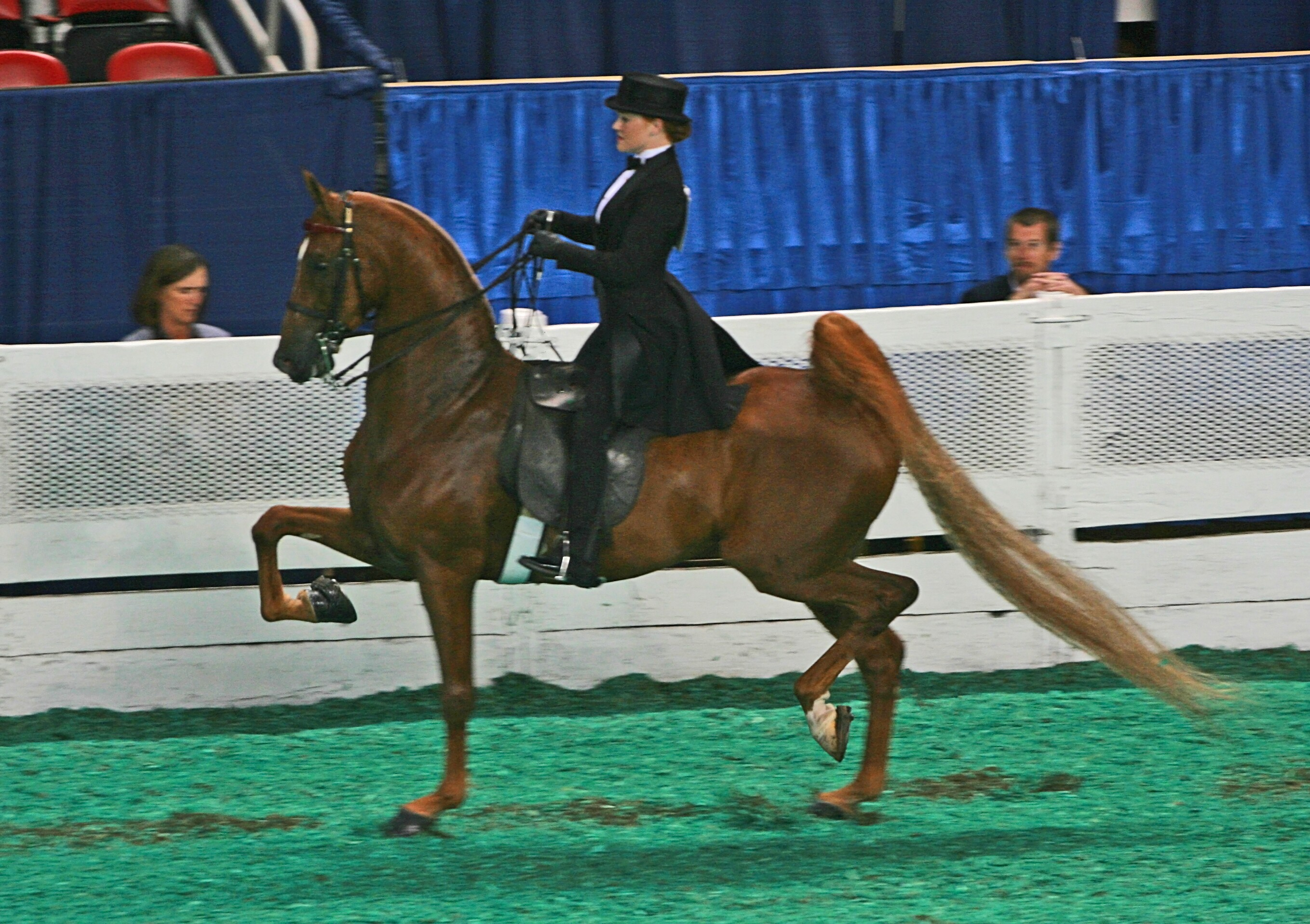
Saddle seat riding

In the United States and Canada, there are two broad categories of English riding: Hunt seat, which is an overall term used in the United States to describe forward seat riding, used both on the flat and over fences. This is the style most commonly associated with the term "English" riding. The other major style is Saddle seat, a discipline created in North America to exhibit dramatic, high-stepping breeds of horses. Saddle seat style riding is seldom seen outside North America, though it has a small following in South Africa. In North America, dressage sometimes is loosely lumped into the "hunt seat" category by Saddle Seat and non-English riders, primarily to differentiate it from the Saddle Seat disciplines.

In addition to the international events listed in the previous section, the broad categories of English riding competition seen primarily within the United States and Canada are:

Categories
Name	Description
Show hunter or Hunter	competition over fences where the horse's form, style and way of going is paramount. It may include Green, Working, and Conformation divisions and a "hunter under saddle" section that does require jumping.
English pleasure or Hunter under saddle	classes in the United States on the flat (not to jump) where horses are evaluated on manners and way of going. It is seen in both hunt seat and saddle seat disciplines.
Saddle seat	English riding show ring competition unique to horses with high trotting action, most notably the American Saddlebred and related breeds. Saddle utilized has a long, flat seat with stirrups set farther back than other designs to allow the rider to encourage elevated gaits, including the trot and various ambling gaits.
Show hack	a flat class seen frequently in Canada, and on a more limited basis in the US, featuring horses of elegant appearance, with an excellent way of going and self-carriage. Dressage tack and attire is usually worn in competitions.
Hunter hack	a hunter-style English pleasure class that combines flat work with a short pattern usually consisting of two jumps and a hand gallop.
Equitation	competition in both hunt seat and saddle seat disciplines where the rider's form and ability to handle the horse is judged. Usually offered for youth riders, Dressage competitions will also occasionally offer an equitation division.

==== United Kingdom/Australia/New Zealand ====
"Show events" or Competition in the UK and Australia, in addition to the international events listed above, include other types of hack, riding, and equipment classes, such as:

Other types of hack, riding, and equipment classes
Name	Description
Riding horse	a flat class for horses between a hack and a hunter in type, and of show quality, substance, good bone, correct conformation, presence and true action.
Show hack	competition featuring horses of elegant appearance, with an excellent way of going and self-carriage.
Show hunter (British)	competition on the flat where horses are evaluated on manners and way of going.
Working hunter	competition over fences where the horse's form, style, and way of going is paramount. ("Working hunter" is also a subgroup of show hunters in the United States)
Campdrafting	campdrafting is an Australian competition in which a horse and rider team work individual cattle over a set outside course. Campdrafters use either English saddles or the Australian stock saddle that was adapted from English tack.

In addition, most of these disciplines in all nations feature an equitation division in which riders are judged on their form and style. At some shows, a sidesaddle division is offered as well.

== See also ==
- Equestrianism
- English saddle
- Bridle
- Horse show
- United States Equestrian Federation
- International Federation for Equestrian Sports
- Equestrian helmet
