= British Show Horse Association =

UK governing body

The British Show Horse Association (BSHA) is the governing body for the showing and registering of hacks, cobs and riding horses.

== Aims and Objectives ==
The aims of the association are to improve the standard of horses shown under their rules, to encourage the breeding of excellent horses, to encourage shows to affiliate to the association, and to safeguard the interests of its members. The association runs an examination and probationary scheme for new judges, and has a Panel of qualified judges, as well as holding a register of members and their equines.

== History ==
The Association, known then as the British Show Hack and Cob Association, was founded in 1935 by owners of show hacks and show cobs, to provide an umbrella body which could oversee the breeding, showing and judging of these animals. Riding horses came under the remit of the Association in 1983, at which time it became known as the British Show Hack, Cob and Riding Horse Association, or BSHC&RHA. As the BSHA, it is now the governing body of showing for hacks, cobs, riding horses, and their youngstock.

== Competitions ==
Affiliated competitions are run under the Association's rules for hacks, cobs, riding horses under saddle, and for broodmares and youngstock in-hand. Championships are held in various areas of the country, including the most prestigious at the Horse of the Year Show.

== See also ==
- Equestrianism
- Horse show
