= Double bridle =

Horse tack

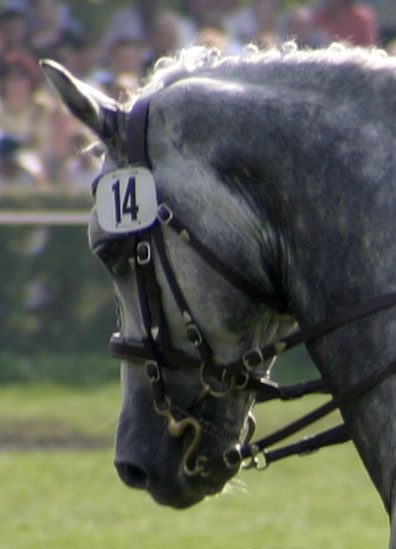
Double bridle, with both curb and snaffle bits.

A double bridle, also called a full bridle or Weymouth bridle, is a bridle that has two bits and four reins (sometimes called "double reins"). One bit is the bradoon (or bridoon), is a modified snaffle bit that is smaller in diameter and has smaller bit rings than a traditional snaffle, and it is adjusted so that it sits above and in front of the other bit, a curb bit. Another term for this combination of curb and snaffle bit is a "bit and bradoon", where the word "bit" in this particular context refers to the curb.

== Uses ==
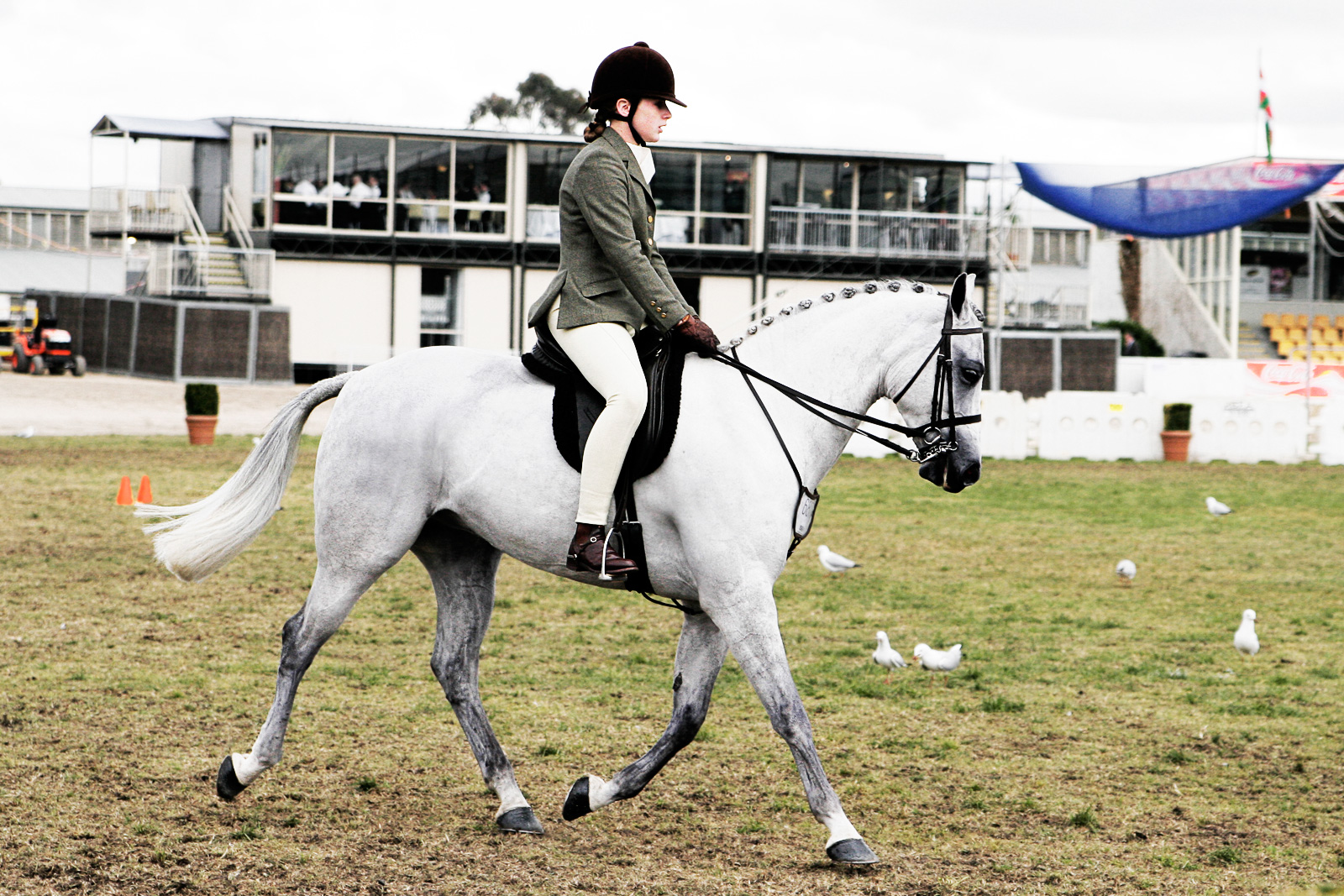
A double bridle used in the show ring.

Double bridles are most commonly associated with dressage and certain horse show classes where formal tack, attire and turnout are standard. They are required for upper level FEI dressage tests (Prix St. Georges (PSG), Intermediaries, and Grand Prix), and are optional at the USDF third and fourth levels. They are also permitted in the dressage phase of eventing at the Intermediate or Advanced levels, although not required. (In eventing, even at the advanced level, snaffle bridles are still the norm.)

Double bridles are fairly common for horse show purposes in Australia, and in the United Kingdom for show hunters and show hacks, but are less common at shows in the United States, except for Saddle seat, show hack and upper-level Dressage competition. Additionally, ladies riding side saddle traditionally use a double bridle. Double bridles used to be seen on show hunters in the United States, but have been replaced by the snaffle.

Double bridles are rarely used by show jumping riders and eventers in the stadium and cross-country phases. The double bridle is still sometimes used by cavalry and police horses.

While the snaffle bridle is more common, the double bridle, in the hands of an experienced rider, is able to transmit more nuanced commands and obtain more sophisticated responses from the horse. Thus, for advanced forms of riding, it is preferred.

== History ==
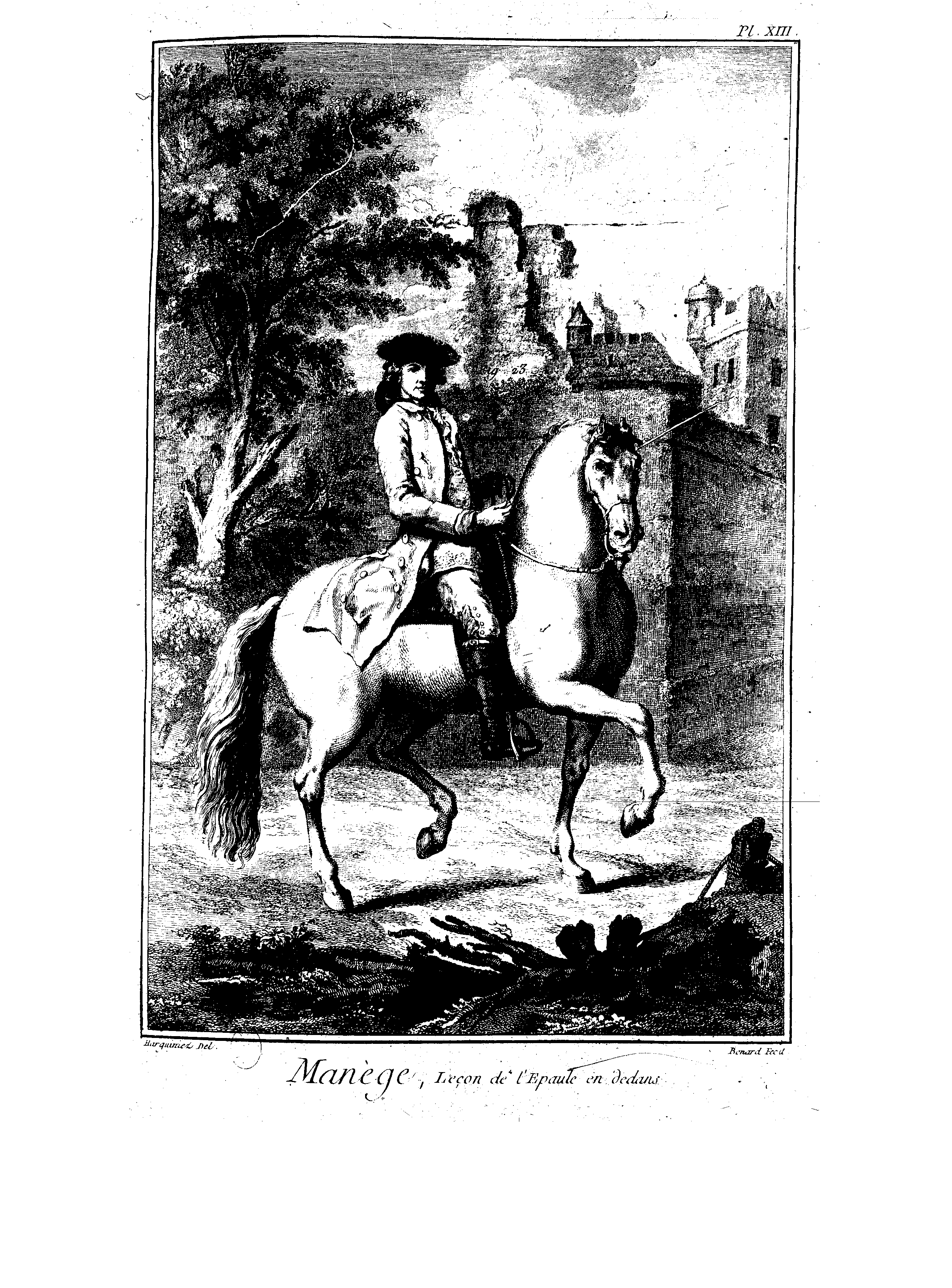
Riding on the curb only.

Double bridles, originally called "full bridles", were much more common several hundred years ago. They were considered the "proper" equipment for a trained rider and horse, while a simple snaffle bridle was only for green horses and riders, young children, grooms, and poor riders. The double bridle is commonly seen in old paintings of hunt scenes, used by the well-trained gentry as they rode cross-country.

Although the modern ideal is for balance between the snaffle and the curb, and most riders today tend to employ the bradoon for the majority of commands, historically, the accomplished rider would "ride on the curb." Riding on the curb indicated lightness in the mouth, was a demonstration that both horse and rider had been highly trained, and that the rider had very good control of his or her hands, and was able to ride the horse mainly from the seat. The rider would keep a modest contact with the curb bit to regulate collection and only engage the bradoon bit to raise the head or reinforce leg and seat aids for impulsion and direction if those aids failed to achieve their effect. With a supremely trained horse and rider, not only would the horse be ridden on the curb only, but with placing both sets reins in one hand and carrying the whip upright in the other. Today, the tradition of riding only on the curb is preserved by classical and advanced military riders, and it is possible to see such performances at the Spanish Riding School. It is also used on finished horses in western riding. The tradition of riding with double reins in one hand is preserved by polo players, where double reins remain the norm but the double bridle has been largely replaced by the pelham bit or the gag bit.

The double bridle was once used frequently by fox hunters, as they could employ the bradoon at the beginning of the hunt, and then use the curb if the horse became excessively excited and forward as the hunt continued. Additionally, it allowed women, confined to riding sidesaddle at the time, to ride hotter horses, with the option of using the curb rein if the horse began to pull too much.

Many eventers also used to ride with the double bridle when going cross-country on exceptionally high-strung horses. However, this practice has fallen out of favor, with most riders preferring the pelham instead, which is less harsh should the rider accidentally make a mistake. Additionally, the pelham could be used with bit converters, which allowed for one rein and made the bit much easier to handle.

== Adjustment and parts ==
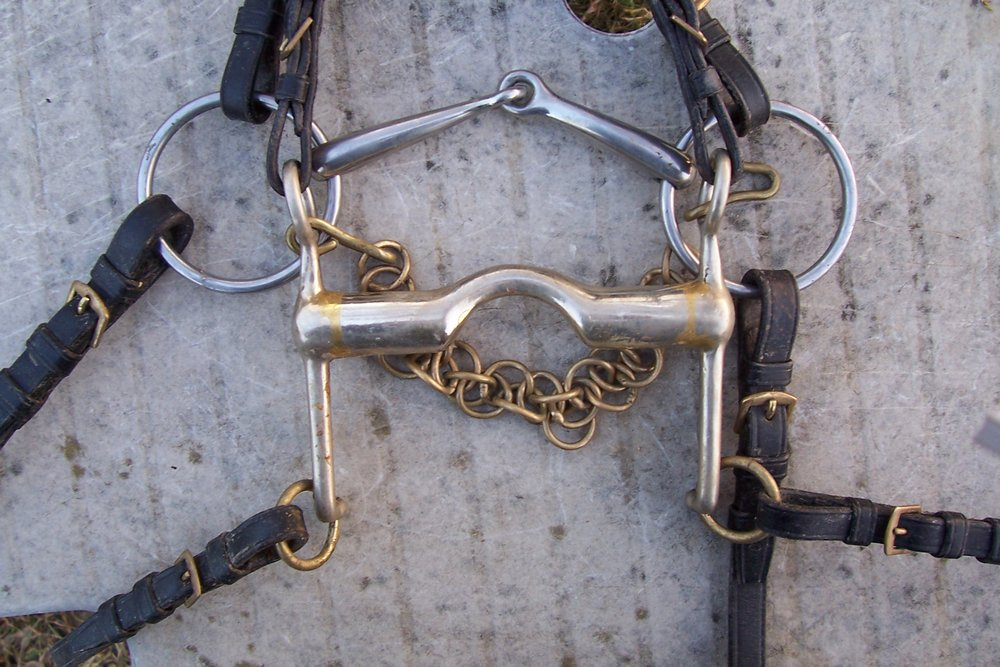
A "bit and bradoon" (curb and snaffle), the two bits of the double bridle

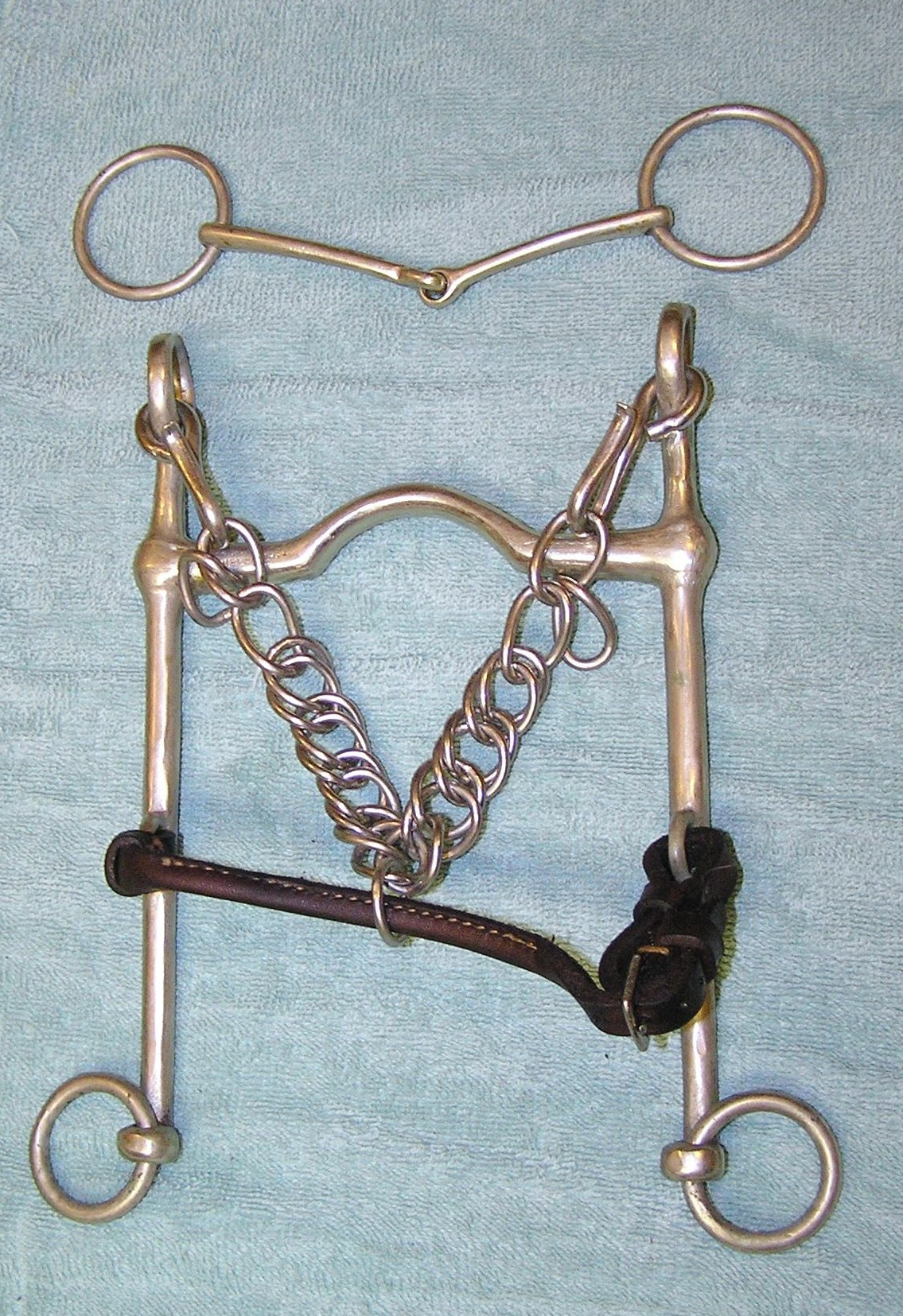
Detail of a "bit and bradoon", long-shanked curb and thin bradoon traditional in Saddle seat style riding

The double bridle differs from the usual snaffle bridle in that it consists of four reins attached to two separate bits: the bradoon-style snaffle and a curb. The curb bit hangs down from the main headstall, and the bradoon has a separate, simpler headstall made from a narrow piece of leather known as a "bradoon hanger" or a "slip head." The bradoon headstall lies under the curb headstall, with the browband of the bridle holding both pieces, as well as the cavesson all together as a single unit.

A bradoon is a snaffle bit designed specifically for use in the double bridle. The bit mouthpiece is usually single-jointed, and the bit ring is usually a loose-ring, less often an eggbutt, or baucher. The rings are smaller in diameter (maximum 8 centimeters) than a regular snaffle bit, and for USDF competition, the mouthpiece must be at least 3/8 inch (9.5 mm) in diameter when used on a horse, with smaller diameters allowed for ponies. It is especially important to choose a bradoon that is the correct width. A bradoon that is too wide may get caught on top of the port of the curb bit and push the bridoon's joint upward into the upper palate, while one that is too narrow will pinch the horse's skin against his molars. Both cases are painful and should be avoided. In general, the bradoon should be about 1/2 inch (13 mm) wider than the Weymouth.

The curb bit, or Weymouth, consists of a mouthpiece with shanks and a curb chain. In USDF competition, the lower shank may be no longer than 10 cm (about 4 in) in length. With a sliding mouthpiece, this measurement is taken when the mouthpiece is at its highest point. The width of the curb bit is also important: a curb that is too narrow will cause the shanks to pinch the lips, one that is too wide will cause the lips to be pinched between the curb and the curb chain and may also cause it to lie unevenly in the mouth. The upper shank should bend slightly outward, to prevent it from pinching when the reins are pulled. The severity of the curb is determined by several factors: longer shanks are considered more severe, as are tighter or thinner curb chains and higher ports.

The bradoon always lies higher in the horse's mouth than the curb bit, and is placed above the curb chain. It is common to place the bradoon a bit higher in the mouth than a snaffle used alone, because it is less likely to get caught on the curb. However, it is important that the bits do not lie too far apart from each other within the mouth, as the tongue may be caught between the two. In general, both bits are chosen to be slightly thinner. Although this increases their severity, most horses prefer thinner bits because it allows for more room for the tongue, which can be uncomfortably cramped with two thick bits sharing the space.

The bradoon rein should be wider than the rein used on the curb bit and in sport horse disciplines is often a bit more grippy (laced or, less often, rubber reins are popular), while the curb rein is thinner and smooth. This makes it easy for the rider to distinguish the two by feel. The extra grip provided by the snaffle rein also helps prevent the horse from pulling it through the rider's hands, which would make the curb rein shorter in comparison and encourage the rider to over-use the curb rein.

When using a double bridle, a cavesson is always used. It should not be adjusted too low, as it may cause the skin and lip to pinch between it and the bradoon. Some riders use a padded crownpiece because the curb places pressure on the poll.

== Use ==
=== Action ===
The bradoon bit works like any other snaffle, placing pressure on the lips, tongue, and to some extent the bars of the mouth. In the classical dressage tradition, the bradoon is used to regulate horizontal flexion (bending the horse left and right) and impulsion (faster and slower). Any action that is meant to place pressure on one side of the mouth must be performed with the bradoon, because the curb is designed in such a way that a pull on one rein will produce equal pressure across the tongue and bars, unless it is extremely harsh. Additionally, use of only one rein of the curb causes the bit to twist in the mouth and the chain to pinch.

The curb bit places pressure on the bars, the palate (especially if the port of the curb bit is fairly large), and via the curb chain, the poll and chin groove. It is used to regulate vertical flexion (cresting the neck and collecting the body through an arched spine), and the poll pressure asks the horse to lower the poll and telescope the neck to raise the base of the neck. If the horse tries to push his nose outward without permission from the rider, the curb reins will automatically come into play and tighten, asking the horse to flex. If the horse stiffens, adding slight poll and tongue pressure with the curb can ask him to relax at the poll.

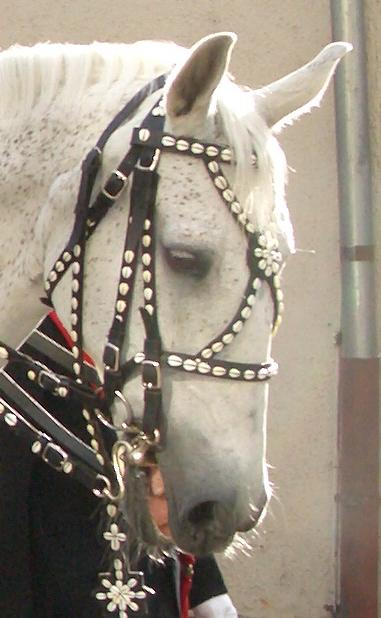
Overuse of the curb causes the horse to draw back his tongue and gape

A rider may increase pressure on the curb alone by lifting their hands forward and upward. The hands remain the same distance from the bradoon because they move around a circle that is a radius equal to that of the bradoon rein. Therefore, the action of the bradoon does not come into play. However, because the curb rein is several inches below the bradoon, raising the hands pull upward on the bit and engages the shank.

When used in Saddle seat tradition, particularly in the United States, the bradoon is used both to raise the head and turn, while the curb is used to lower the head, soften the jaw, and to slow the horse. In saddle seat riding, contact is to be maintained equally on all four reins.

In modern dressage, most riders employing the double bridle "ride on the bradoon." In other words, they keep a steady contact with the bradoon bit and only engage the curb bit to when necessary to encourage the horse to collect. As a result, the bradoon rein keeps slightly more pressure, and the curb rein, although in contact, is much softer. In competition, total loss of rein contact of the curb (which will result in the rein being bowed) will cause a severe deduction from the rider's score. To ride mainly from the bradoon while still keeping a soft contact on the curb, the rider must have steady, soft hands and a correct hand position. To activate the bradoon separately from the curb, if the rider is using the most common rein holds (described below), the rider simply rotates the lower fingers into the hand and slightly upward, which will tighten pressure on the bradoon. The upper part of the hand, where the curb is held, remains in the same point in space and acts as a pivot, so that the pressure on the curb does not change.

=== Dangers of misuse ===
Riders must be skilled before attempting to use the double bridle, and the horse should be far enough along in his training that the double bridle would be accepted and understood. It is a refined piece of equipment that can greatly enhance the riding in good hands, or destroy the animal's training and mouth. Because it uses two bits, it has a much greater chance of damaging the horse's mouth if used incorrectly.

The rider must have an independent seat and soft hands. Additionally, they should be able to keep their horse moving uphill with elevated shoulders, or else activating the curb will cause him to hollow, fall onto the forehand, and flex incorrectly at the 3rd vertebra rather than the poll. The rider must also take care to determine if a double bridle is proper for the individual horse's training and temperament. Certain sensitive horses will do better if kept in a snaffle for a longer period of time. Horses that tend to be lazy or behind their rider's leg will also become more so if ridden in double bridle before they are consistently forward.

Overuse of the curb will cause the horse to go behind the bit, open his mouth, draw his tongue back in his mouth to escape the pressure, or damage the tongue. Additionally, it can cause unpure gaits, including a "pacey" walk, a stiff trot, and a 4-beat canter. Overuse of the somewhat thin bradoon can lead to a hard mouth, and in severe cases, cause sores or bleeding at the corners of the mouth.

=== Martingales ===
If a running martingale is used with a double bridle, only the snaffle reins should run through the rings. Running curb reins through the martingale creates excessive amounts of leverage and can cause pain to the horse if misused. While fox hunters once were known to ride with a running martingale attached to the curb rein, today this practice is relatively non-existent, partly because the double bridle is only common in equestrian disciplines that usually do not use a running martingale. However, if a running martingale is used on the curb, however ill-advised, it is extremely important to use rein stops, as the martingale ring is sometimes larger than the ring on the curb bit shank, and can get caught on the bit with potentially disastrous consequences.

== Holding the reins ==
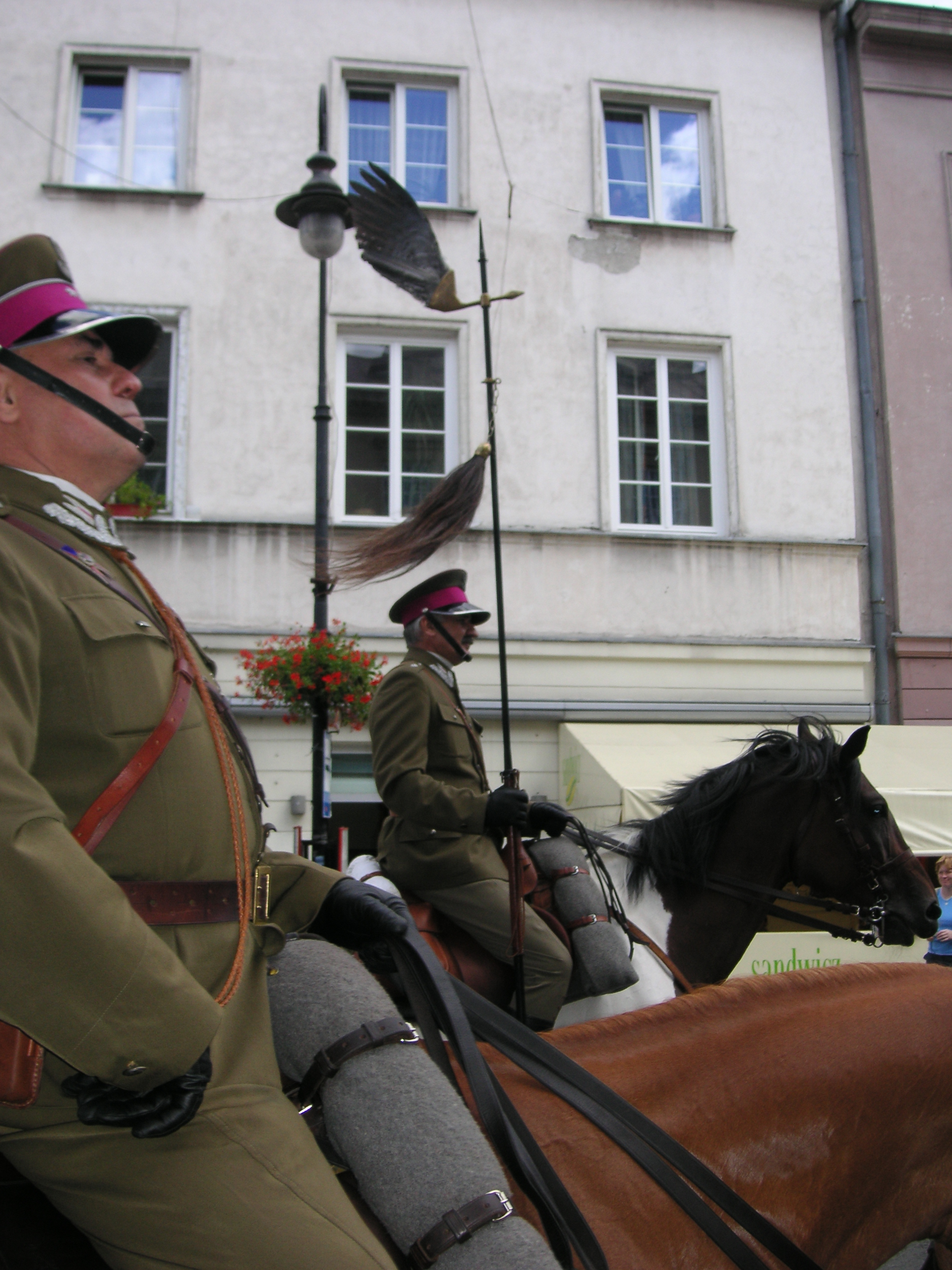
Military rein hold

When first learning to use the double bridle, it can be helpful to gain experience holding and manipulating two reins without actually using the more severe curb. To do so, the rider may place two reins on the snaffle. A rider may also ride on contact with the snaffle rein, keeping the curb rein loose until the hold becomes comfortable and familiar.

There are several types of rein holds which offer various degrees of action between both bits.

=== Military rein hold (4 reins in one hand) ===
The traditional cavalry hold has the rider place all four reins in the left hand; in this way, the right hand is left free to hold a sword, lance, or other weapon. The precise order of reins has varied from era to era, from country to country, and to suit specific circumstances of battle or pageantry. In every case, a great deal of precise control is needed to selectively engage the bradoon or curb independently. Less schooled troopers may ride while engaging only a single pair of reins for one bit, and allowing the reins for the second bit to bow and thereby apply only the passive effect of gravity on that bit.

This rein hold is also seen in competitive dressage, during FEI freestyle tests. It demonstrates the horse's throughness, self-carriage, and obedience due to the fact that the rider has little control with the reins except to create flexion. When used, it can increase the difficulty of the movement, thereby helping the rider attain a higher score if executed well.

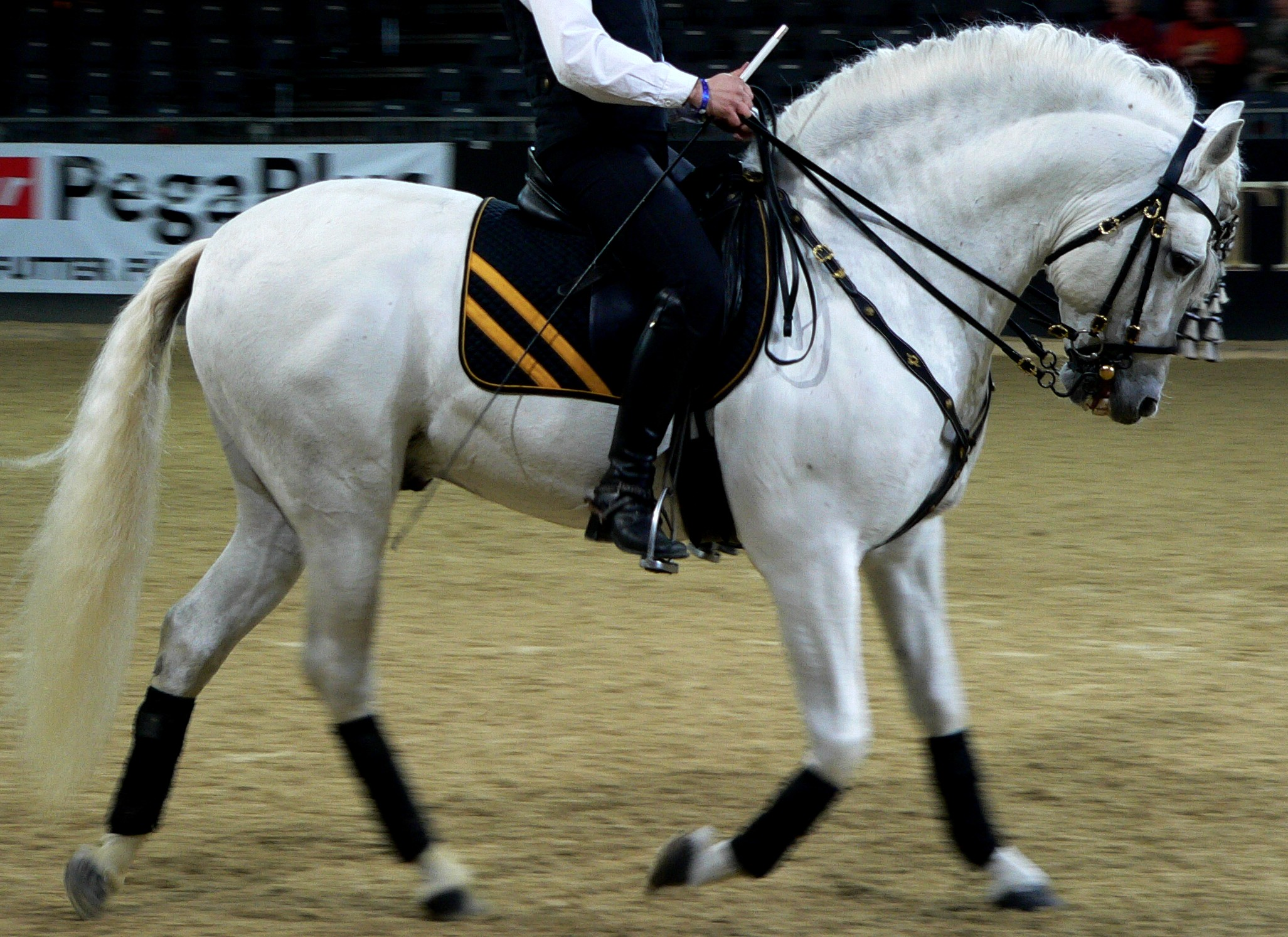
2 to 2 hold with the curb rein higher. Click to enlarge

=== "2 to 2" rein holds, with more pressure on the bradoon ===
"2 to 2 holds" involve the rider holding two reins in each hand. The two most commonly used in the United States allow for softer use of the curb rein. In one such hold, the rider holds the bradoon rein under the fourth finger (pinkie or little finger), and the curb between the third and fourth fingers. In the second method, the bradoon is held between the third (ring) and fourth finger, and the curb between the second and third fingers. The latter is in some ways preferable, because the rider continues to hold the snaffle rein between the ring finger and pinkie, in the same manner as when riding with a snaffle alone, and so will already have the feel developed for that use. Additionally, pressure from the bradoon rein pushing on the underside of the little finger can encourage riders to raise their hands, because it will feel as if there is not longer a perfectly straight line from elbow to bit. In either case, the reins cross one another, the rider should be sure that the curb rein crosses under the bradoon when the horse is viewed from the side, so that it is closer to the neck. Both these holds allow for the rider to flex his or her hand and apply slightly more contact to the bradoon than to the curb, allowing it to be softer.

In both cases, the ends of the reins usually leave the fist between the thumb and index finger, as seen when riding with just a snaffle rein. However, another variation allows the end of the snaffle rein to leave between the first and second fingers, and the end of the curb to leave between the thumb and first finger. This allows the rider to easily identify each rein and adjust the tension on each. It also helps to avoid too much tension on the curb rein.

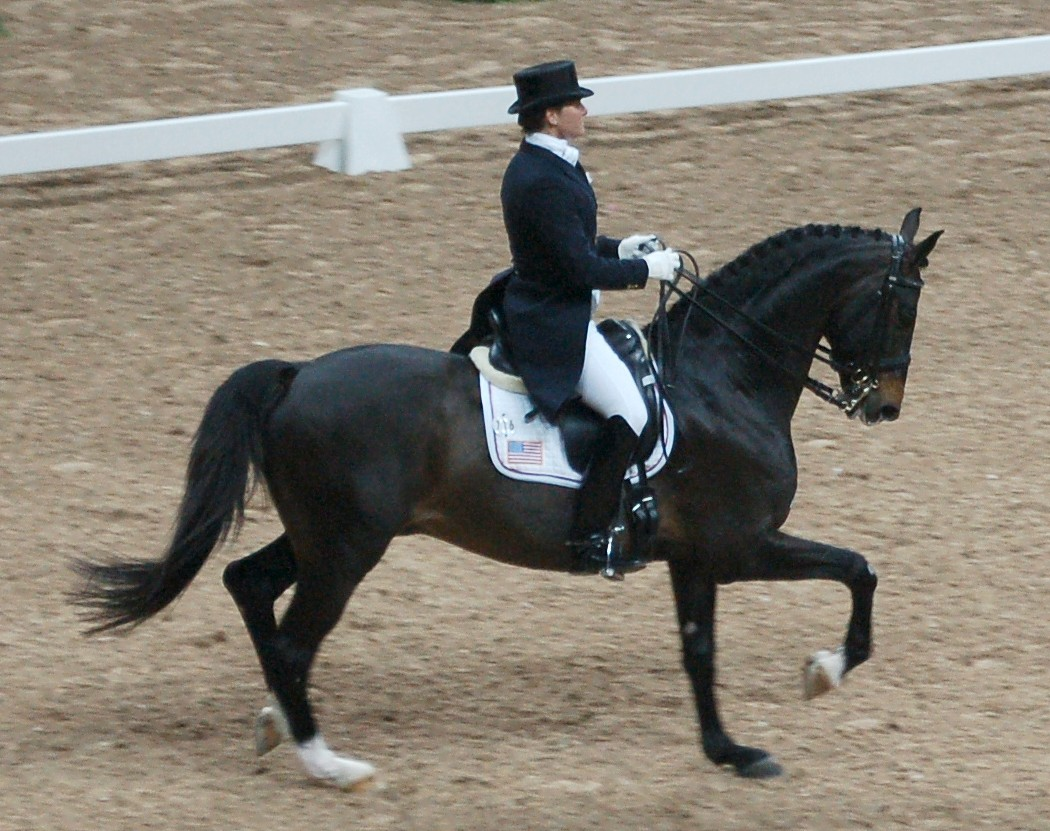
2 to 2 hold with the curb rein lower. Click to enlarge

=== "2 to 2" rein holds, with more pressure on the curb ===
There are several rein holds which increase the ratio of curb to bradoon pressure. In all these cases, the curb rein is held lower down in the hand than the bradoon, so that the two reins do not cross when the horse is viewed from the side. As the distance increases between where the two reins insert into the hand, the curb reins becomes more and more prominent when rein pressure is applied. This is because the curb has greater action when the lower part of the hand is flexed back. This hold is usually used if the horse is especially hard-mouthed, easily distractible, or needs a bit more curb action because he tries to raise his head. It should only be applied by riders with exceptionally soft hands who have a good foundation in using the double bridle.

Two of the mild forms of this type of hold involve the curb rein either under the fourth finger, or between the fourth and third finger, while holding the bradoon between the second and third fingers.

The most extreme form of this is called the "Fillis Hold", named after James Fillis. It involves the curb rein being held under the pinkie, and the bradoon rein held like a driving rein, between the thumb and first finger. The two reins therefore insert into the hand as far away as they possibly could and allow each set to be used with considerable leverage. Therefore, either rein can be used without the influence of the other, simply by rotating the lower or upper part of the hand back. This hold is commonly seen used (correctly) by the dressage rider Philipe Karl. However, when used incorrectly, which can be extremely easy to do even by excellent riders, it causes the horse to flex at the third vertebra instead of the poll, a major fault.

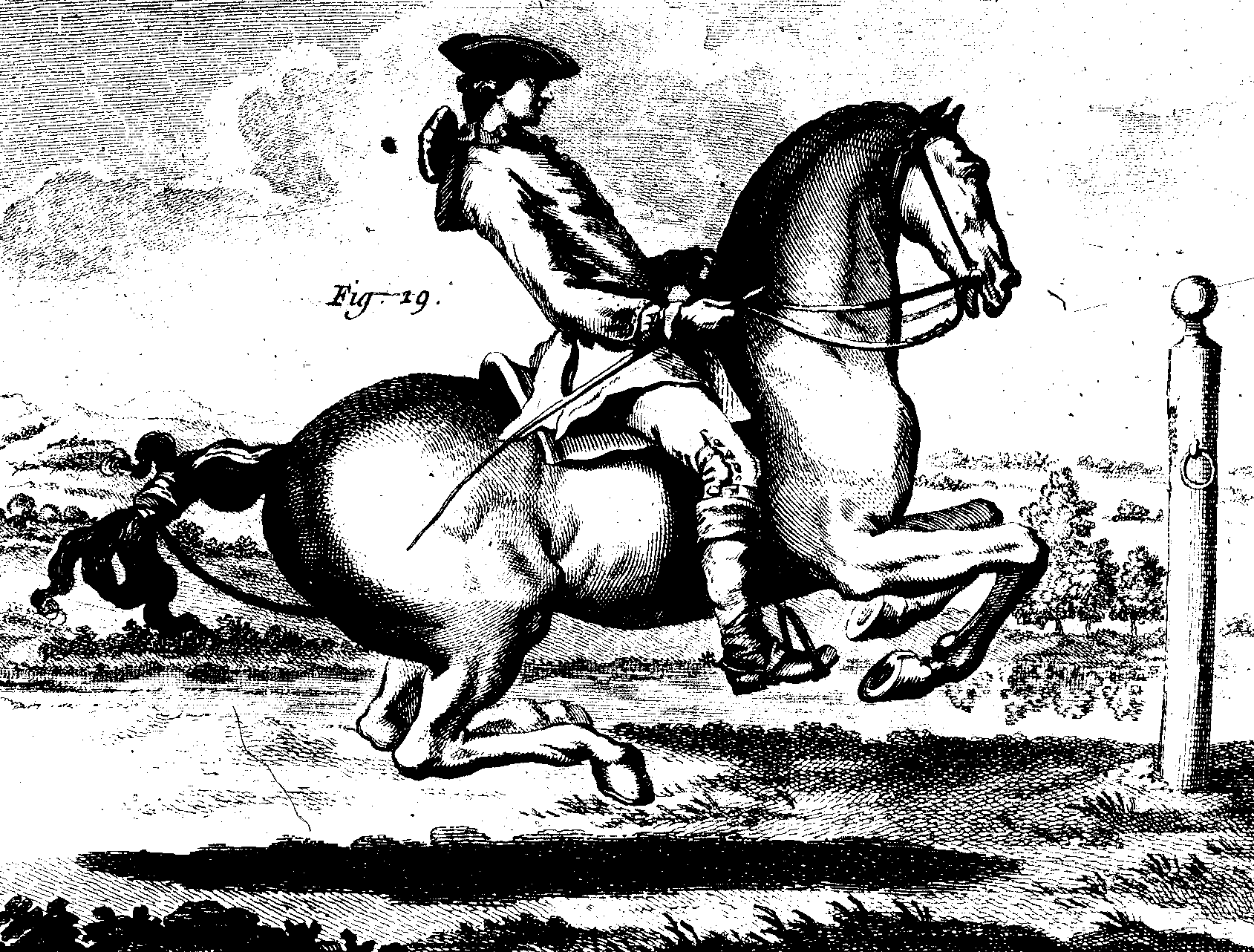
The 3-to-1 hold, with the right bradoon rein in the right hand, and the rest in the left.

=== "3 to 1" rein hold ===
In the 3 to 1 rein hold, one hand (historically, the left hand) holds three reins and the other only one rein. The three-rein hand controls both curb reins and the bradoon rein which belongs to that side, and the other hand simply holds the other bradoon rein and the whip. It is a hold that was common to the classical dressage tradition. Today the 3 to 1 rein hold is used while training, rather than competition, although it is still seen used by the Spanish Riding School.

The left hand holds the left bradoon rein below the fourth finger (pinkie), the left hand curb rein between the third and fourth fingers, and the right hand curb between the second and third fingers. It is held right over the pommel of the saddle. The right hand holds the bradoon as it would normally hold a snaffle (between the third and fourth fingers), and the hand is held very close to the left hand. This hold has several important consequences: it decreases the action of the curb, it prevents the rider from riding with their hands too wide or performing an overzealous opening rein with their left hand, and it shows when the horse is not properly straight, because the rider can no longer make the rein pressure on one side of the mouth any stronger than the other, since reins from both sides are held in the left hand. The rider must ride off the seat and legs to bend the horse, and the horse must therefore be properly "through".

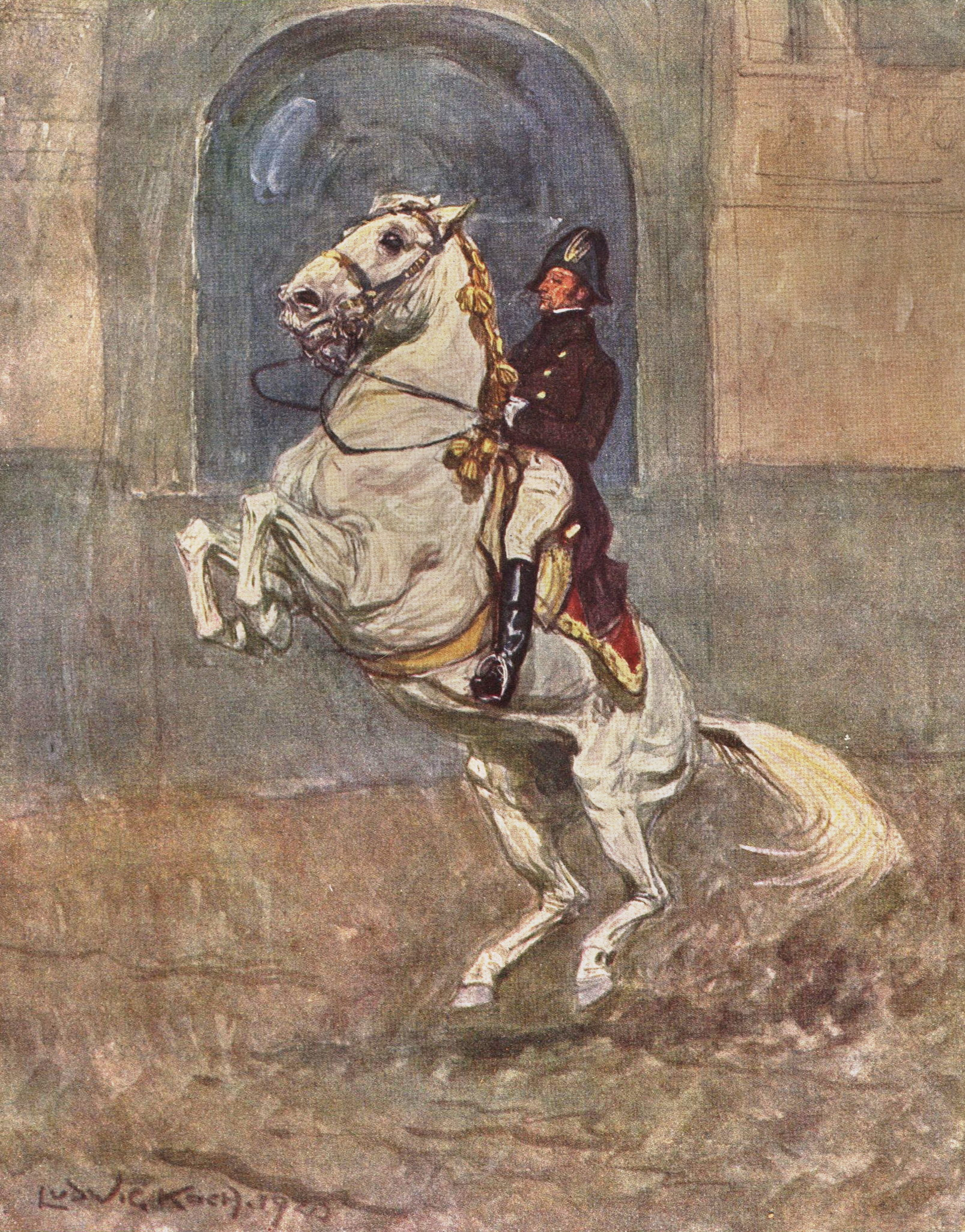
Riding on the curb.

=== Riding on the curb only (auf blanker Kandare reiten) ===
The bridoon reins are dropped on the neck near the withers, and contact is kept only with the curb, both reins being held in the left hand. This means that the rider must have good hands, a well-developed seat, and the horse must accept the bit, or else the horse will end up overbent. The rider can only create bend in the horse with the seat and legs, not the hands.

The whip is held upright in the right hand, going back to the tradition where the sword would be held in such a way as a salute. This method is rarely practiced today, although still seen used by the Spanish Riding School, the Escola Portuguesa de Arte Equestre, and the mounted troops of the household cavalry in London, England.

The method is also mandatory at the higher levels of the equestrian discipline of Working Equitation.

== Western riding ==
A distantly related variation on the English double bridle is the "two rein" setup used in the western riding classic vaquero tradition (also known as the "buckaroo" or "California" tradition) of developing a "spade bit" horse. Rather than use of a bit and bradoon, the trainer uses a thin bosal style hackamore over a complex type of curb bit known as a spade. This tradition originated with the same haute ecole and military uses of horses in the Middle Ages, but developed differently from classical dressage since approximately the 16th century, when Spanish horse trainers arrived in the Americas. In this tradition, the ultimate goal is use of one hand on the spade alone. A young horse is started in a bosal, then is transitioned into the spade by wearing both the spade bit with progressively smaller diameter bosals, with the rider usually carrying the reins in the 3 in 1 hold. The reins of the spade bit are romal style, with light chains or small lead weights added between the bit and the rein so that it balances perfectly in the mouth of the horse. Over time the trainer uses the bosal less and less until the horse travels with lightness and collection on the spade alone. The process of moving from a bosal alone to a "straight up" spade bit horse using the spade alone can take many years, as long as it takes to bring a Dressage horse to Grand Prix level. For practical working purposes, the modern cowboy of the vaquero or "buckaroo" tradition usually keeps a light bosal on the finished horse as a type of noseband.

== See also ==
- Bridle
- English riding
- Horse tack
