= Show hack =

Type of competition horse

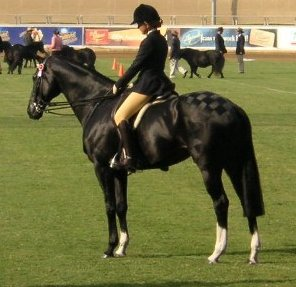
A show hack in Australia

The show hack is a type of ridden show horse, exhibited to a standard first established in England.

Affiliated showing and breeding of the show hacks in the United Kingdom is overseen by the British Show Horse Association.

In the US and Canada, show hack is solely a form of competition open to various breeds and overseen by the USEF and Equine Canada (EC). The Canadian form of competition is more closely modeled on the British standard than that of the US.

== Conformation and breeding ==
Show hacks in the UK are divided into two height classes - small hacks are 148 to 154 cm and large hacks are 154 to 160 cm. In Canada, there are also height divisions, at the discretion of show management. Ponies are defined as standing under 14.2 hands (58 inches, 147 cm), and horses may be divided into two or three sections; 14.2 h up to 15.3 hands (63 inches, 160 cm), and over 15.3 h, or 14.2 h to 15.2 hands (62 inches, 157 cm), over 15.2h to 16 hands (64 inches, 163 cm), and over 16 h.

Australian show hacks are of any breed and are usually divided into height classes in the following categories: pony, under 14 hands (56 inches, 142 cm), Galloway, over 14 hands and under 15 hands, and Hacks over 15 hands (60 inches, 152 cm). Other classes may include pony hack ridden by a child, lady's Galloway or Hack, gent's Galloway or Hack, educated hack, sidesaddle, pleasure and heavyweight hacks.

Hacks in any nation must be of elegant appearance, and show excellent self-carriage. In the UK, they are usually full or part-bred Thoroughbreds. Anglo-Arabians are particularly successful in these classes. In the United States and Canada, in addition to horses of Thoroughbred and Arabian breeding, Morgans, Ponies, Warmbloods and part-Warmblood horses also are seen, as North American competition favors a dressage-like frame and way of going.

== Manners and movement ==
Hacks in the UK must have straight movement and move with "pointed" toes. Individual shows do not need to show a gallop, but should show rein back alongside the usual requirements of halt, walk, trot and canter. Workouts in Australia are similar to the UK however, a horse is often asked to show lengthening in the trot and canter and simple or flying changes of lead at the canter.

In North American classes, the show hack is to show at extended, regular and collected versions of the walk, trot and canter, as well as performing a hand gallop, halt and the rein back. Particular emphasis is placed on gait transitions and obedience. While fluid, smooth gaits are always desired, a more dressage-like frame is favored. Some show hack classes for specific breeds, particularly those for the Arabian and Morgan, encourage some animated knee action, though in Canada, use of weighted shoes is prohibited.

In Canada, riders may be asked to dismount and remount their horses, and horses may have their saddles removed for conformation judging. Conformation scores may be used to break a tie.

Worldwide, manners are particularly important in the judging of hacks, and any animal behaving badly will be severely penalized in the judging.

== Turnout ==
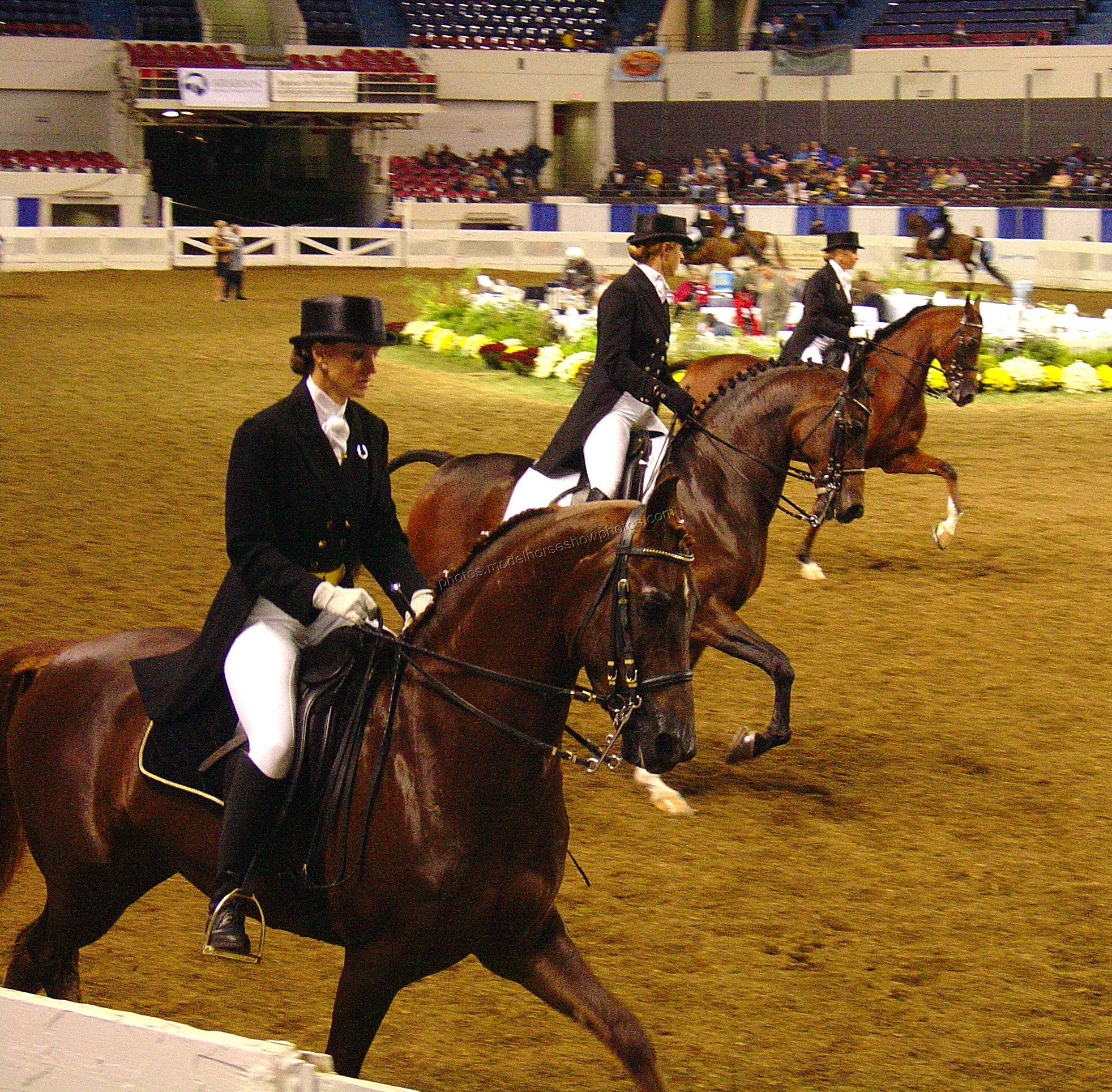
Show Hack class in the United States

Hacks in the UK are shown in lightweight bridles with coloured browbands. Quarter marks may be applied to the haunches of the horse, often in a chequerboard or triangular pattern. Riders should wear buff or canary breeches, navy jackets, shirt and tie, tall riding boots and a navy hat. Show canes may be carried.

In the US, the attire and turnout for Show Hacks are modeled on dressage competition. While any type of correct hunt seat tack and attire is legal, the preferred style (even before 6:00 pm when formal attire is generally worn) is that of formal Grand Prix Dressage: Black or navy shadbelly, top hat, white breeches, black boots, white gloves, dressage saddle and double bridle. Whips are permitted, spurs are optional. Coloured browbands are not allowed, though dressage-style browbands with some ornamentation are acceptable. Kimblewick and Pelham bits are allowed in addition to traditional snaffle bits and double bridles. Horses are usually shown with a braided mane and the tail is left unbraided or lightly pulled on the upper portion of the dock in a manner similar to dressage competition.

Canadian turnout rules are somewhat in-between the US and UK rules. Riders are to wear a black or dark jacket, white or tan breeches, and may wear any type of English riding hat, including a top hat, derby. or hunt cap. Tweed jackets may be allowed at the option of show management. Whips are not allowed, spurs are optional. Bridles may be double, pelham, snaffle or Kimblewick. Browbands must be of leather and may have some ornamentation, but cannot be coloured, sequined, or solid white. The formal shadbelly is not seen in open competition as often as it is seen in the US, other than in breed-specific competition. Horses may be braided.

Australian turnout rules are reasonably flexible, depending mainly on the location of the events with country shows being somewhat less formal. Hack turnout classes however have strict protocols regarding the complete turnout and appearance. The biggest equestrienne and hack competition of Australia is the Garryowen trophy which is held at the Royal Melbourne Show. The competition is judged on mount, costume, saddlery, riding ability and general appearance of horsewomen.

== Other North American "hack"-type classes ==
A related North American class, Hunter hack, is not a true show hack class, but rather is a type of English pleasure class where exhibitors in Hunt seat tack and attire perform on the flat at a walk, trot, canter and hand gallop, and then jump two low fences. The desired horse in this competition is to resemble a show hunter rather than a show hack.

Another variation on show hack is the Road Hack, a class seen in Canada and in Morgan horse breed competition. The rules are similar to Show Hack, but a greater emphasis is placed on the extended gaits.

Under Canadian rules, English pleasure is a subdivision within the Hack division, whereas in the USA show hack is usually considered a subdivision of English pleasure.

== See also ==
- British Show Horse Association
- United States Equestrian Federation
- Horse show
- Hack (horse)
