= Cob (horse) =

Small stout horse type

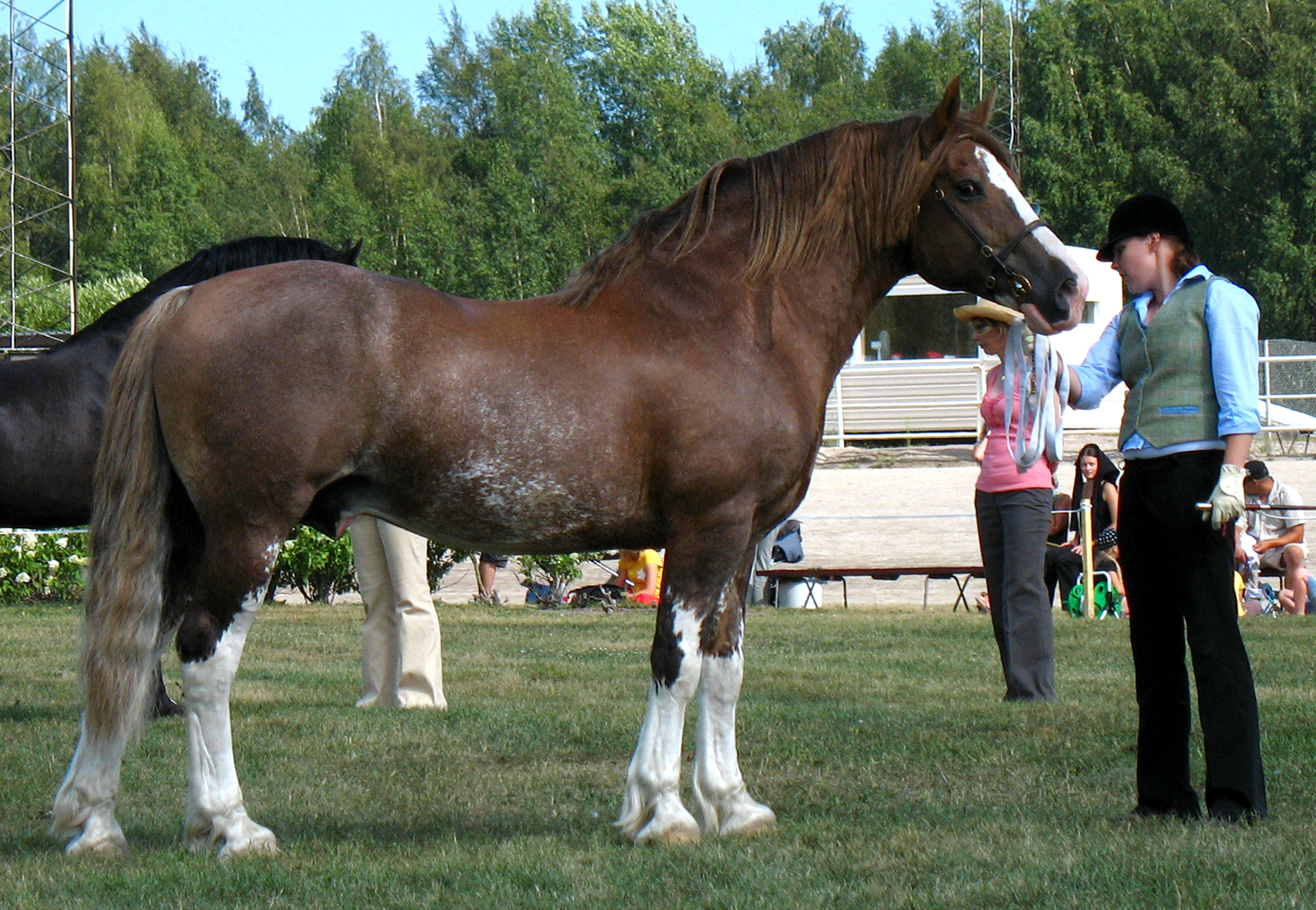
A cob

A cob is a horse of stout build with a steady disposition, and capable of carrying considerable weight. It is a type of horse rather than a specific horse breed.

== Description ==
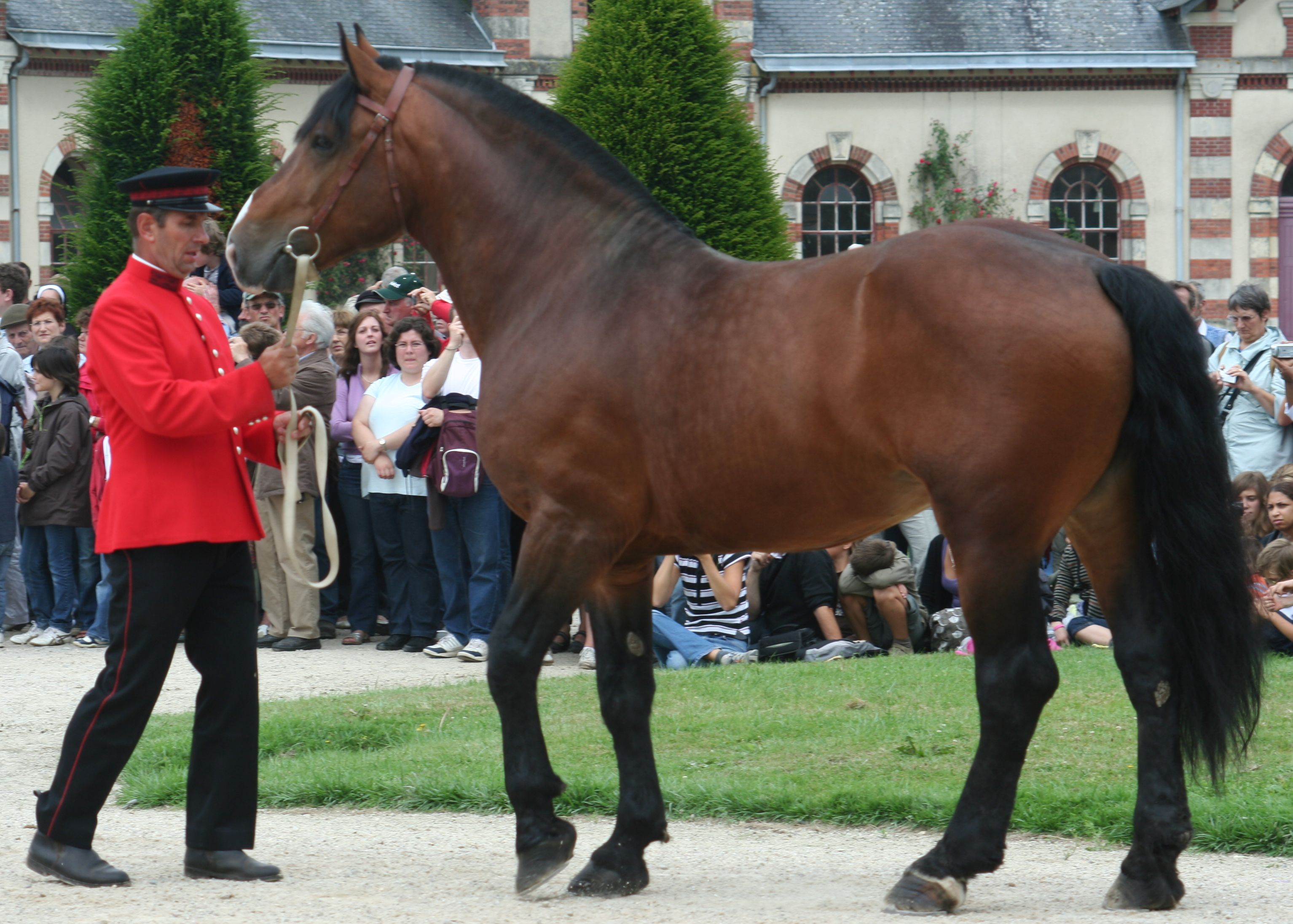
This Norman Cob stallion is a good example of a cob type.

The cob type is a short heavyset horse, well-muscled with a short back and neck, rounded quarters, a deep girth, and heavy bone. Cobs are known for having a good disposition and manners, being placid, and easy keepers. Historically, cobs were used as dual-purpose horses that could pull a cart or wagon as well as be ridden. They were also used as mounts for stout gentlemen.

Earlier known as a rouncies, the term cob started being used in the eighteenth century. According to the Oxford Dictionary of Word Origins, the word cob has several meanings which all have in common "the underlying idea of being stout, rounded, or sturdy".

== Breeds ==
Cobs are usually a combination of several breeds, often by a chance breeding, but occasionally deliberate. There are two breeds with cob in the name—the Welsh Cob and the Norman Cob—though many breeds have cob-type conformation as their standard.

The Irish Cob was considered a type, not a breed. Although bred since the eighteenth century, it was an admixture of Thoroughbred, Connemara pony, and Irish Draught horses. However, in 1998 the Irish Cob Society was established, "dedicated to the preservation, promotion, and development of the Irish Cob breed". In 2012, it ceded to Horse Sport Ireland, which now manages the Irish Cob and Irish Cob Part-Bred Studbook breeding programmes. Another organisation that maintains studbooks for cob types is the Traditional Gypsy Cob Association. According to The Traditional Cob Registry, the Irish Cob was developed by Irish Travellers, while the Gypsy cob in the United Kingdom was developed by Romani people.

== Showing ==
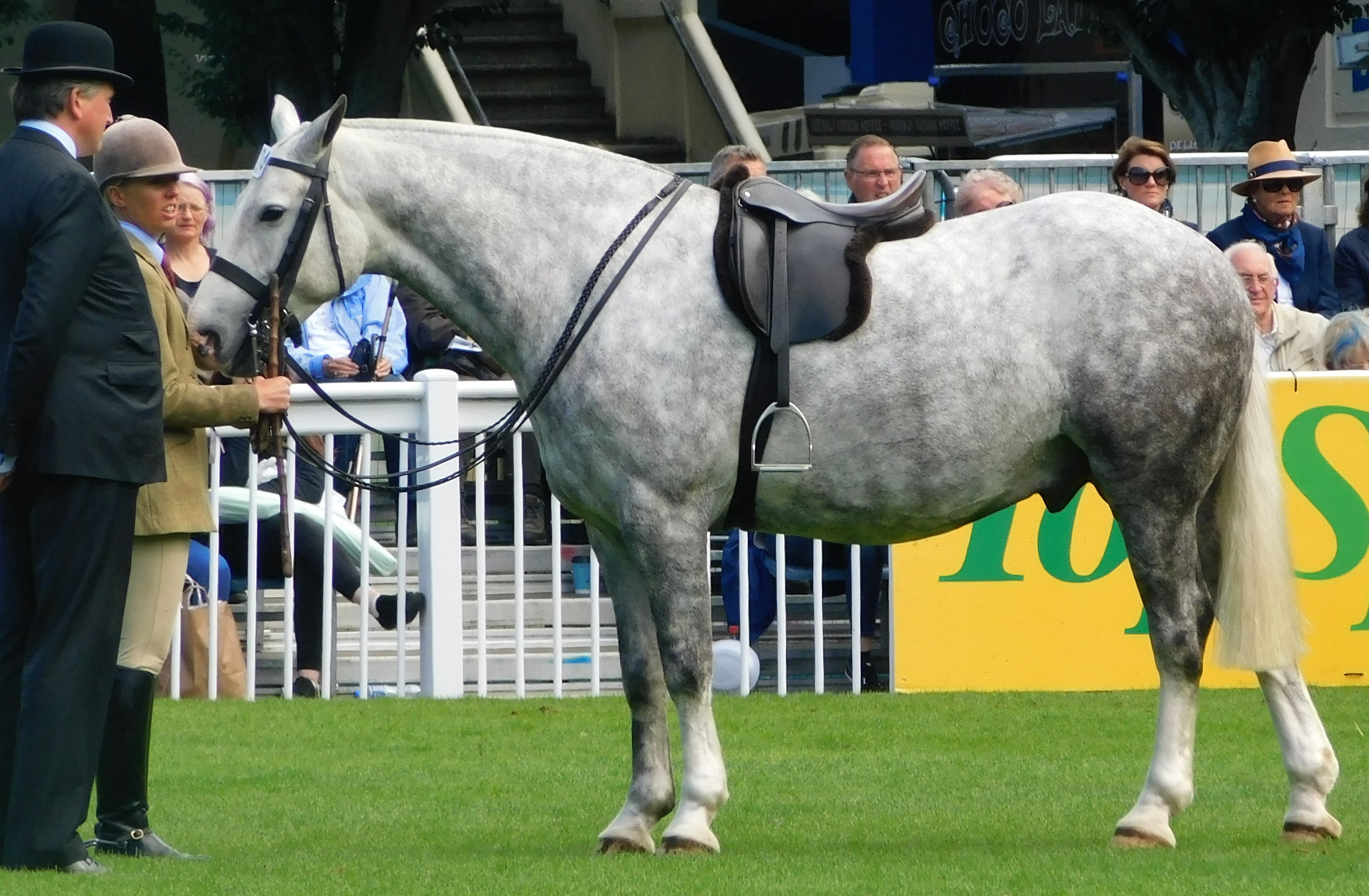
A typical lightweight show cob (Ireland 2017)

In some circles, cob types are divided into 'traditional' and 'show', with the former being more rugged with full manes and leg feathering, and the latter being presented tidy with hogged manes and pulled tails. In England, it was the fashion to show cobs with docked tails, until the mid-1900s when docking was outlawed. It is said that a good show cob should have "the head of a lady and the backside of a cook".

Showing of cobs in the United Kingdom is overseen by the British Show Horse Association, formerly known as The British Show Hack, Cob and Riding Horse Association. Classes are divided into lightweight, heavyweight, and maxi. Lightweight is for horses exceeding 148 cm (14.2 h; 58 in), but not exceeding 155 cm (15.1 h; 61 in), and capable of carrying up to 89 kg (196 lb). Heavyweight is for horses exceeding 148 cm (14.2 h; 58 in), but not exceeding 155 cm (15.1 h; 61 in), capable of carrying more than 89 kg (196 lb). Maxi Cob is for horses exceeding 155 cm (15.1 h; 61 in), to be judged as cobs; judges must pay particular attention to type (i.e. short legged animals of cob type).
