= Horse pain caused by the bit =

Injury caused by horse tack

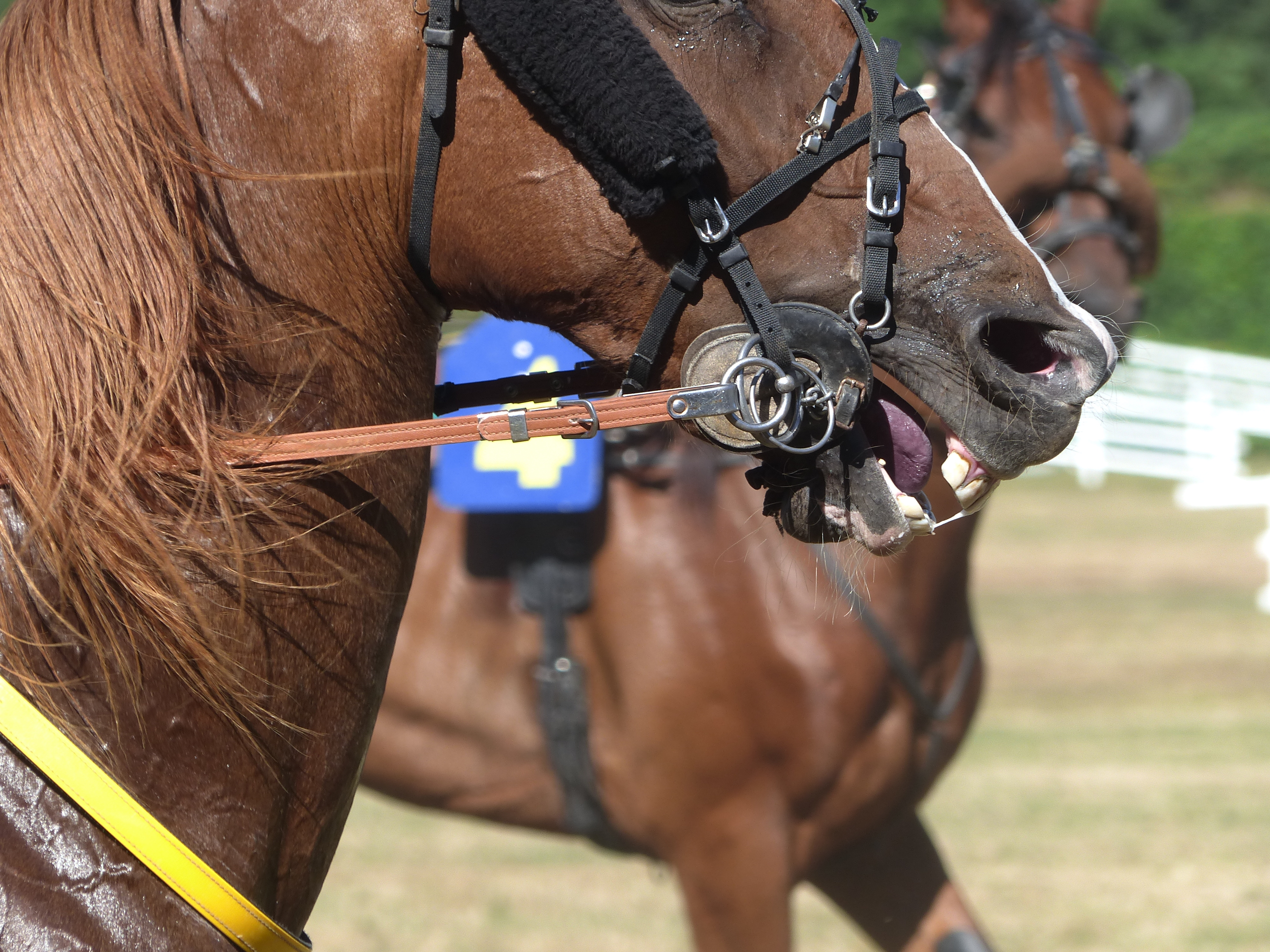
French Trotter mare showing signs of venous compression on its tongue, due to the pressure of the reins connected to the two bits in its mouth

Horse pain caused by the bit refers to the range of painful sensations that horses may experience during riding or driving, resulting from the use of a bit. These sensations can vary in intensity and duration and are typically associated with poor adaptation of the equipment to the horse's morphology or the application of excessive pressure. Such pain is frequently linked to oral lesions, particularly in the corners of the mouth, interdental spaces, premolars, and tongue. These injuries are often not externally visible, such as in the case of internal hemorrhaging, and therefore receive limited attention. Pain and lesions may be accompanied by fear and anxiety in the animal. All horses wearing a bit controlled by reins, whether mounted or harnessed, may be affected, especially when significant rein tension is applied.

The animal's suffering related to bit use is often overlooked by both riding and driving practitioners, partly due to habituation to behavioral signs of oral discomfort, which are commonly misinterpreted as normal behavior. This phenomenon is referred to as bit-blindness. Researchers and veterinarians working in this area recommend regular inspections to detect potential injuries in the horse’s mouth, including the labial commissures.

== General ==
=== Pain management in horses ===
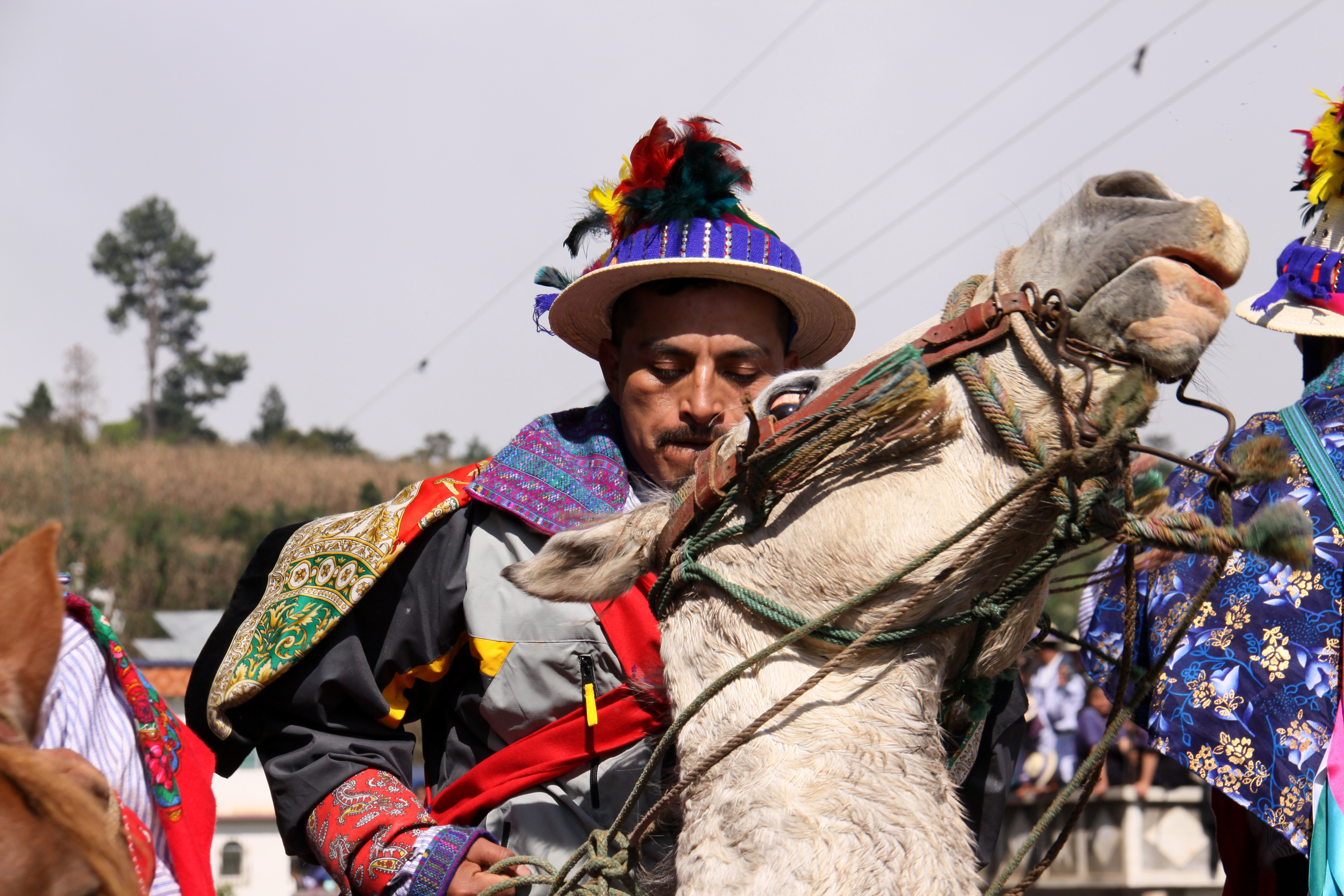
Guatemalan horse with compression of the lower jaw, caused by the rider's hands on the reins connected to its chain bit

Like all mammals, horses have a conscious experience of pain, which they instinctively seek to avoid in favor of comfort. This sensation is triggered by a noxious stimulus and serves as a warning system to minimize tissue damage. As flight animals, horses typically respond to painful stimuli by attempting to flee. Pain is often accompanied by anxiety and fear.

=== Bit usage ===
During riding and driving, horses are generally required to wear a bit in the mouth, connected to reins. The bit can be invasive for the animal. Its design and the forces exerted through the reins play a critical role in the oral health and comfort of ridden or harnessed horses. The snaffle bit rests at the corners of the mouth. Palate or tongue bits apply pressure to the palate, the upper part of the mouth. The bit ring come into contact with the corners of the lips, while the barrel of the bit rests in the interdental space—an area between the incisors and molars composed of jawbone covered by a mucous membrane, known as the "bar". The horse's tongue typically passes underneath the barrel. According to Guillaume Henry, when a modern bit is properly fitted—without excessive tightening of the noseband or curb chain—and remains inert, it does not cause significant pain. Pain generally results from the rider’s use of the reins. The bit has been standard equestrian equipment for millennia and is generally regarded as both indispensable and ethically justified.

=== Problems caused by the bit ===
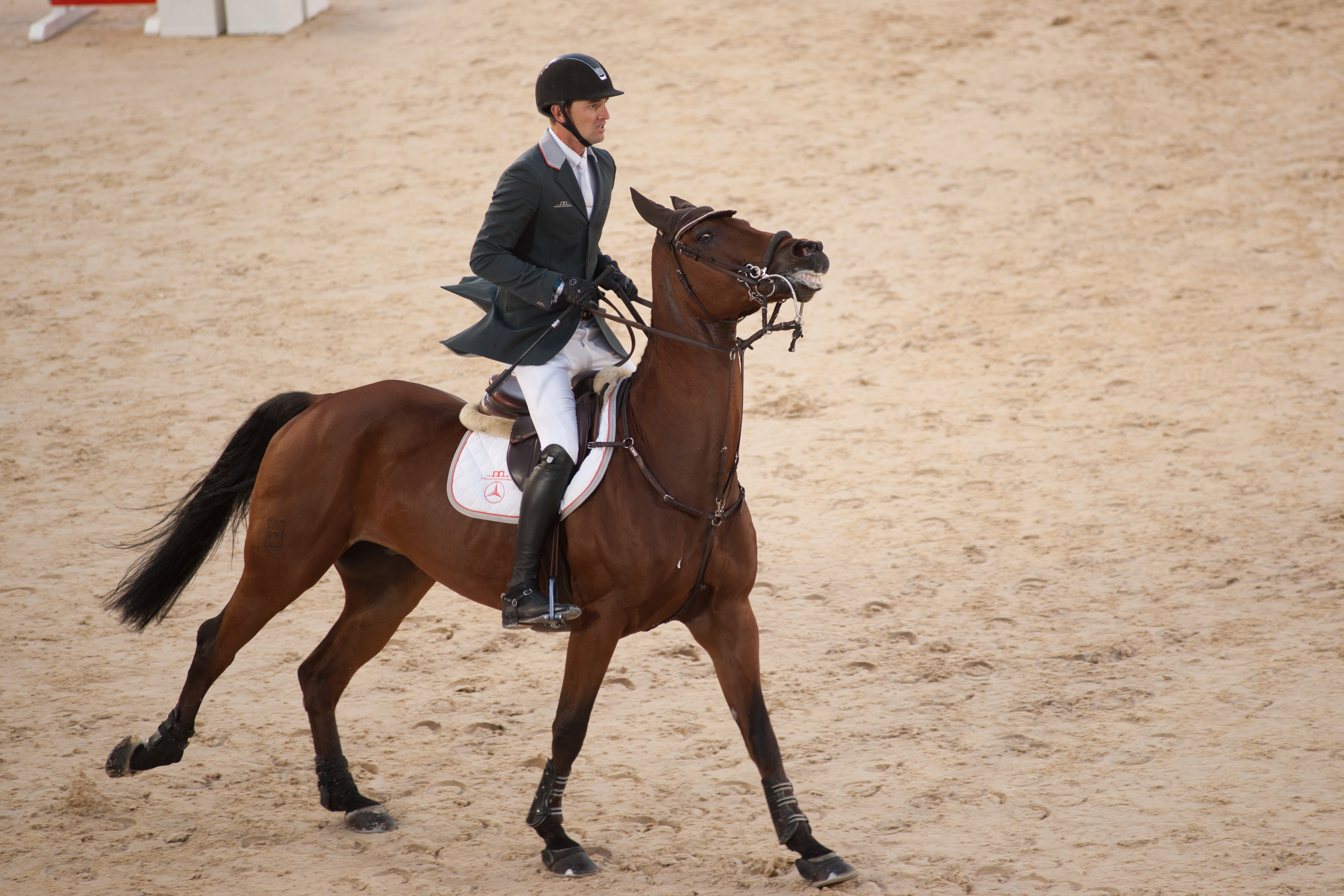
Bit with long shanks used in show jumping

The issue of bit-induced pain is relevant not only to equine welfare but also to sporting performance, as even mild discomfort can distract the horse from its tasks. Historically, some bits have been extremely painful, including those with spiked barrels or central articulated bridges capable of injuring the palate. Certain modern bits have also been associated with increased incidence of lesions, such as long-shank curb bits in Icelandic horses, Crescendo bits, straight non-articulated mullen bits, and straight plastic bits used in trotting horses.

Although bits have been used since the Bronze Age, the pain and injuries they may cause have only recently been the subject of scientific study, particularly since the late 2010s. As of 2005, no data were available on how horses respond behaviorally to bit-induced pain. Due to inconsistencies among rating scales used in early research, veterinary surgeon Dr. Kati Tuomola (University of Helsinki) and her colleagues developed a lesion measurement scale in 2019 to standardize data collection and facilitate statistical comparison in subsequent studies.

== Painful areas ==
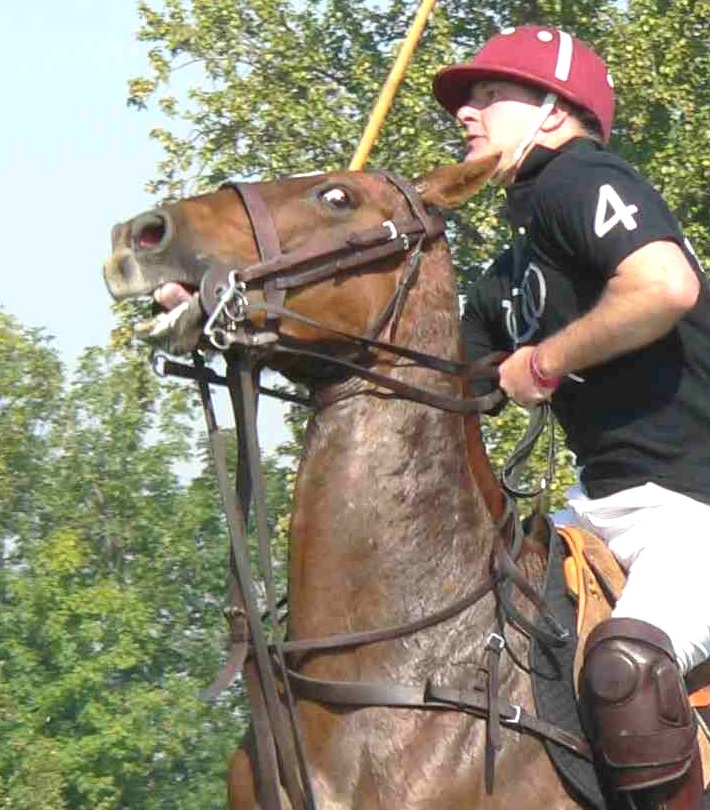
Polo mare showing physical signs of mouth pain (eye rolled back, ears back, mouth open and tongue visible)

The entire oral cavity of a horse is sensitive to pain. Wearing a bit stimulates numerous sensory receptors, particularly in the interdental space, tongue, labial commissures, and buccal mucosa. The interdental space, also known as the bar, is especially sensitive. The bite stimulates nociceptors mediated by the trigeminal nerve, affecting the lips, tongue, teeth, and bones. The gum tissue consists of the periosteum, which is the most sensitive part of the bone. The horse's oral mucosa is composed of stratified squamous epithelium and underlying connective tissue known as the lamina propria. This mucosa is densely innervated to monitor all substances entering the mouth, which is the entry point to the digestive system.

Cook and Kibler have compared the discomfort caused by a bit to the sensation of a pencil barrel pressing against the gums in a human. Pain may also result from the tongue being pinched between the bit and the jawbone, or from the lips being stretched longitudinally to twice their normal length due to rein tension.

Mouth pain caused by the bit may result from tissue compression, laceration, stretching, inflammation, and impaired blood circulation. Repeated rubbing or impact from the bit can cause bruises, cuts, tears, and ulcers inside the horse's mouth. Swelling and bleeding of the bars may lead the horse to attempt to move its tongue over the bit. Sudden or abrupt rein actions generally result in acute pain. A particularly painful scenario occurs when the bit rests directly on the molars, without support from the corners of the mouth or the tongue.

Cook and Kibler conducted a study comparing the behavior of 66 horses before and after transitioning from bitted to bitless bridles. They reported a reduction in pain-related behaviors in 65 of the 66 horses, with an average decrease of 87% in observed pain signals. However, the findings are limited by potential sampling bias.

== Lesions ==
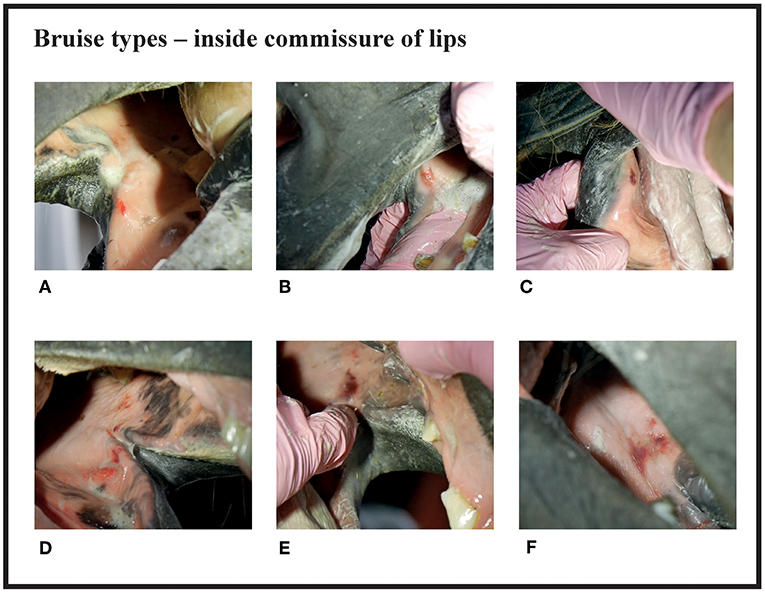
Different types of lesions inside the corners of the mouth of Finnish horse after a race

According to several scientific publications, oral lesions caused by bit use are considered "common".

In 2008, Tell and colleagues conducted a study on Swedish horses ridden with bits, concluding that ulcers near the first and second premolars and at the corners of the mouth were caused by the bit and bridle, independently of dental floating routines. Odelros and Wattle examined the mouths of 144 Standardbred trotters in 2018 and found that 88% exhibited oral lesions.

In 2019, Uldahl and Clayton examined only the external corners of the mouths of Danish eventing horses after a competition, without inspecting the interior of the mouth. They reported that 6 of 80 horses (7.5%) and 1 of 33 ponies (3%) had external lesions. That same year, Tuomola and colleagues studied 261 Finnish trotting horses after races and found that 84% had lesions in the bit area, categorized as mild (21%), moderate (43%), or severe (20%) according to a lesion assessment scale developed by the authors. In the bit area, 70% of horses had bruising and 40% had open wounds. Approximately 2% of horses exhibited visible bleeding from the mouth after the race, while 5% of removed bits showed traces of blood. The authors noted that the absence of visible external blood does not rule out the presence of serious internal injuries. Such injuries are frequently observed in horse racing and may be pre-existing, acquired during, or worsened by competition. This is likely related to the nature of the sport, as harnessed horses are controlled exclusively with reins and bits, often under considerable tension.

A 2021 study by the Finnish team conducted after a cross-country event concluded that warmblood horses were more likely than ponies to exhibit oral injuries. The study also found that mares were at greater risk of developing lesions than geldings. Of the 208 horses examined, 52% had acute oral lesions in the bit area, classified as mild (22%), moderate (26%), or severe (4%). No external bleeding was observed, with only one horse exhibiting internal oral bleeding.

=== Injuries to the corner of the mouth ===
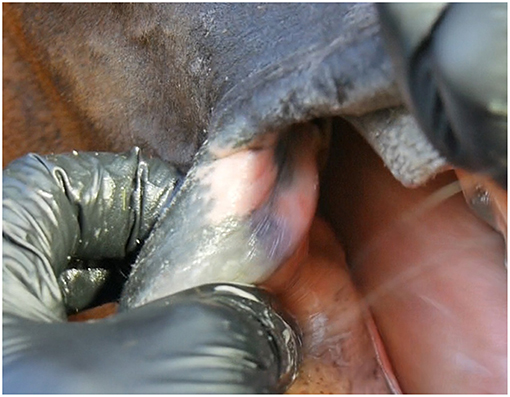
Depigmentation of the corners of a horse mouth at the point of contact with the bit

Comparative studies indicate that lesions at the corners of the mouth occur only in horses that regularly wear a bit. A study by Mata et al. comparing polo ponies and racehorses found that racehorses using snaffle bits had a significantly higher prevalence of commissure lesions and ulcerations than polo ponies using bridle bits.

Prolonged contact with the bit at the corners of the lips can result in depigmentation, likely due to chronic pressure or past inflammation inhibiting melanocyte function. This depigmentation is considered indicative of old or repeated injuries and is more commonly observed in eventing horses than in trotters.

=== Mandibular injuries ===
Approximately 26% of trotters examined by Tuomola et al. in 2019 were found to have injuries to the mandibular bars, compared to 31% of Icelandic horses examined by Björnsdóttir et al. in 2012.

The bit may strike highly innervated and sensitive areas of the mouth, including the teeth. Contact with the incisors can occur when the bit is inserted or removed, potentially causing pain or anticipation of pain. The bit may also contact the wolf teeth—small, vestigial first premolars located in front of the second premolars in the upper jaw and near the bars in the lower jaw. Repeated impact on these teeth can cause hypersensitivity and lesions.

These lesions are generally found near the maxillary teeth; those located around the lower second premolar can be particularly difficult to detect. Periostitis (inflammation of the periosteum, often resulting in bone spurs) frequently develops on the bars of domestic horses, often accompanied by enamel and dentin erosion. These types of lesions are not observed in wild horses that have never worn a bit.

Although some oral injuries may be caused by sharp enamel edges, the majority are attributed to bit use and the resulting mechanical action when reins are engaged. This pressure causes the mucous membrane to slide over the teeth with increased force. Medium-sized articulated bits are associated with a lower risk of mandibular injury compared to non-articulated bits. Over-tightening of the noseband or other equipment may also contribute to mandibular injuries by pressing the mucous membrane against the teeth. Tight nosebands have also been associated with lesions at the outer corners of the mouth.

=== Tongue injuries ===
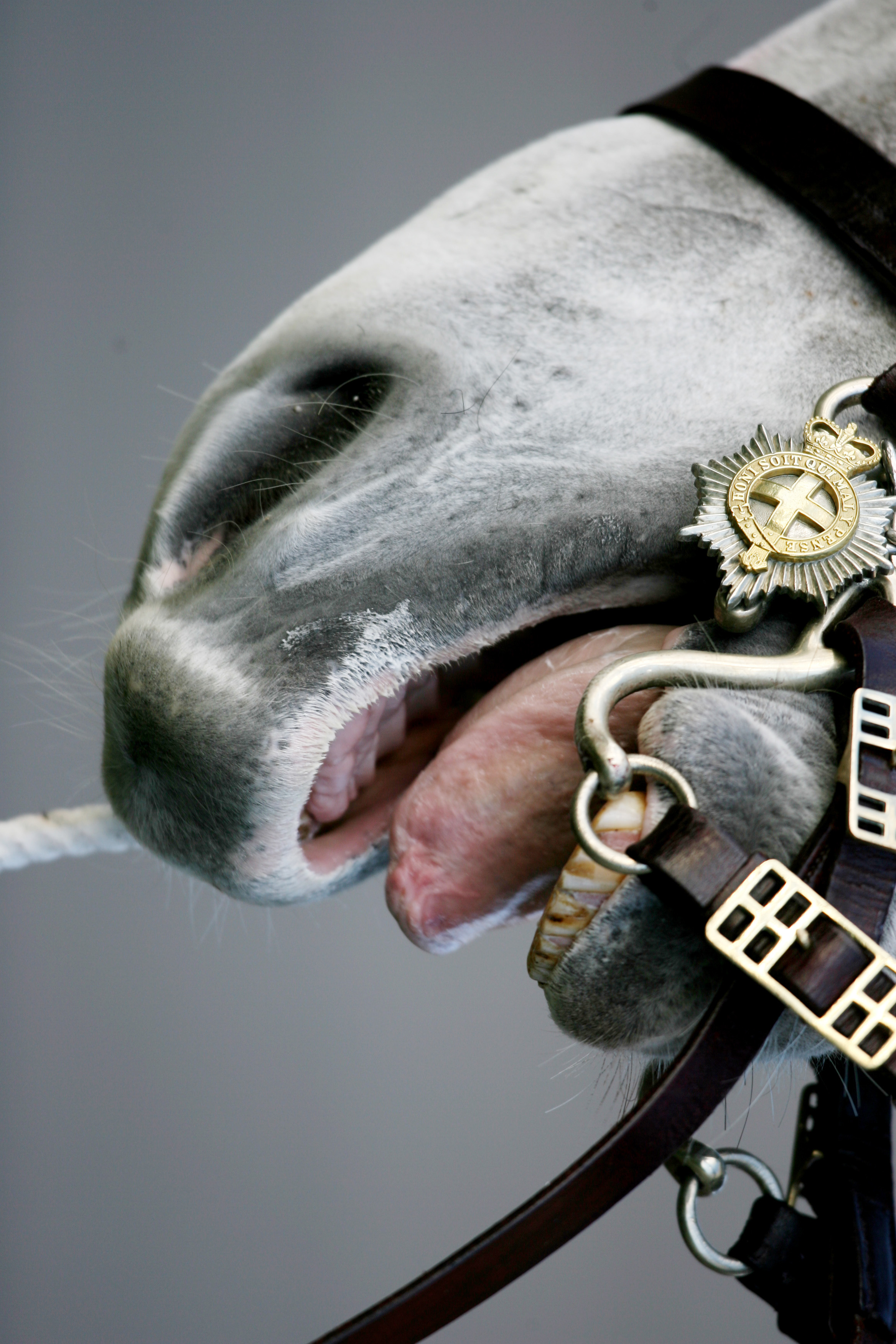
Parade horse showing the tongue in normal coloring

The horse's tongue is highly sensitive and therefore susceptible to injury. The primary cause of lingual injuries is bit use.

==== Compromised vascularity ====
When blood circulation in the horse's tongue is restricted by tack, discoloration may occur. Dr. Jacques Laurent identifies three types of vascular compromise in the tongue.

- arterial compression alone, resulting in a white coloration;
- venous compression, leading to a blue, swollen tongue; and
- mixed compression, which is the most commonly observed.

According to Laurent, prolonged vascular compromise may lead to lingual amyotrophy and diminished superficial and deep sensitivity in the tongue.

Swedish dressage rider Patrik Kittel has been criticized for repeatedly riding horses displaying blue tongues, notably Akeem Foldager in 2014 and Watermill Scandic in 2009 and again in 2014. The 2009 incident resulted in a public controversy; however, Kittel was cleared of wrongdoing by the International Federation for Equestrian Sports.

==== Lingual lesions ====
Among the 261 trotters examined by Tuomola and colleagues in 2019, nine horses presented with tongue lesions: four had bitten their tongues during the race (1.5%), three had bruises under the tongue (1.1%), and two had bruises on the sides of the tongue (0.8%). However, it remains unclear whether all of these injuries were caused by the bit.

Visible oral bleeding in horses is sometimes attributed to tongue-biting. However, this explanation is not always supported by clinical data; in Tuomola's study, only one of the four horses that bit its tongue exhibited bleeding. Therefore, oral bleeding may be more commonly linked to other pre-existing lesions sustained during harness racing.

=== Healing ===
In general, the horse’s mouth has a rich blood supply and moist environment, both of which support effective wound healing. The time required for epithelial cell renewal is estimated at 52–75 days for the skin, 41–57 days for the gums, and approximately 25 days for the oral mucosa.

However, persistent inflammation can delay healing, as can the presence of foreign bodies in the wound, which provoke a strong inflammatory response that impedes normal tissue repair. According to Tuomola et al., the bit may act as a foreign body within the mouth, potentially interfering with the healing process.

== Behavioral pain signals ==
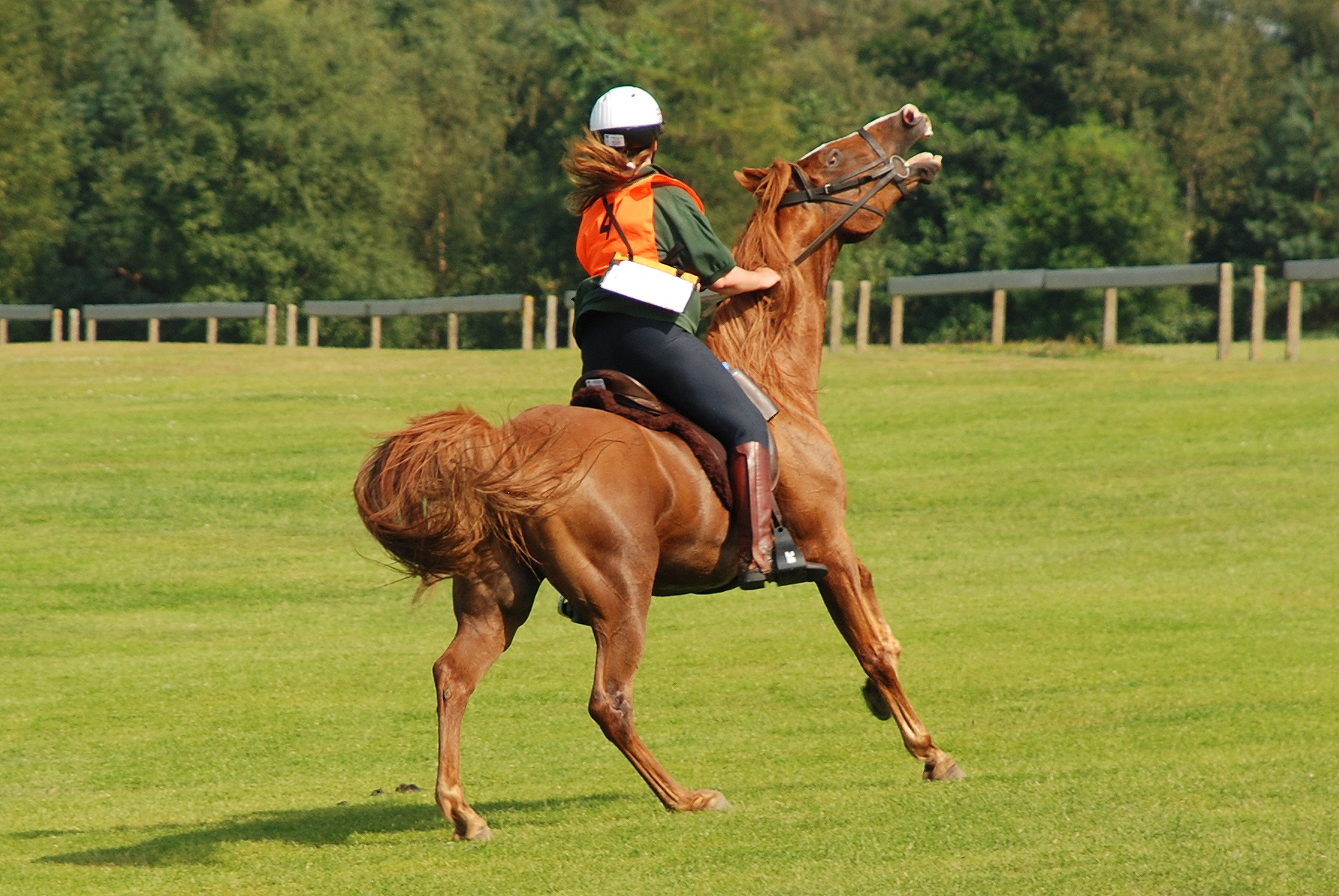
Physical signs of mouth pain: mouth opening, head lifting (incensing), eye rolled back and towards rider's hand, dilated nostrils, tail wagging

When experiencing oral pain, horses exhibit behavioral signals. Indicators of bit-related pain often overlap with behaviors seen in horses in conflict with their rider, suggesting that oral pain may be a significant underlying cause. In cases of severe pain, horses may become averse to being touched in the mouth, complicating veterinary examinations.

According to David Mellor and Ngaio Beausoleil, "most horses show clear behavioral signs of aversion to a bit in the mouth, ranging from mild irritation to intense pain". These signs include resistance to bridling and accepting the bit, mouth opening, teeth grinding, excessive salivation, and tongue movements. Additional indicators include altered head and neck positions (suggesting attempts to escape bit pressure), specific facial expressions (such as eyes rolled back and dilated nostrils), body movements (including tail whipping), and a tense or abnormal gait. These behaviors are notably absent in wild horses and in domestic horses ridden without a bit or bridle.

Stereotypical or sexist interpretations of behavioral signs in mares can compromise their welfare when such behaviors are attributed solely to gender, leading to misinterpretation or dismissal of pain-related signals.

If a horse experiences frequent oral pain from bit use, it may develop anticipatory anxiety or fear, particularly in cases of intense or prolonged discomfort. Mellor also identifies breathlessness as a potential consequence of bit-induced oral pain, especially during dressage sessions.

== Human perception and pain control ==
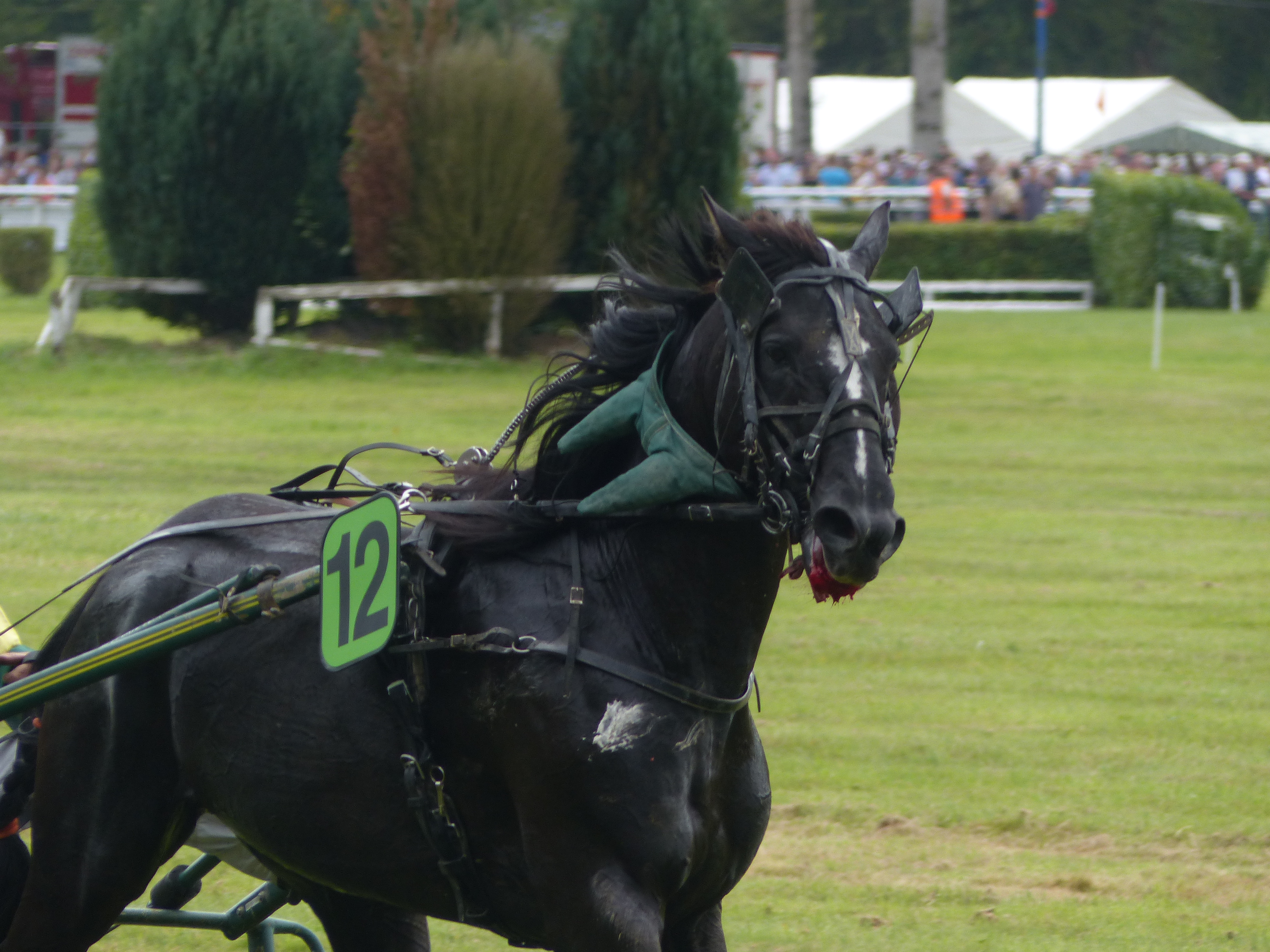
Mouth bleeding of a French Trotter during a race at Saint-Jean-des-Prés racecourse in 2017

Many riders mistakenly assume that horses do not experience mouth pain from bits. Some veterinarians consider it likely that bit-related pain signals go unrecognized by most humans, as they are commonly observed and often misinterpreted as normal behavior—a phenomenon referred to as "bit-blindness". In one study, racehorse trainers expressed surprise upon learning that their horses had sustained severe oral lesions.

Tuomola and colleagues recommend systematic inspection of the bit-wearing area by both riders and event organizers. In their 2019 study of 261 trotters, they found that 20% (51 horses) had severe lesions—defined as either multiple injuries or large, deep wounds likely to cause significant pain and heal slowly. Of these, 65% (33 horses) competed again within two weeks, 13 within one week, and two the following day, suggesting that many did not have sufficient time to recover.

The authors emphasize the importance of minimizing these negative experiences by preventing, diagnosing, and treating oral injuries promptly and by ensuring conditions that avoid prolonged suffering. They also recommend thorough assessment to determine when a horse is fit to compete. Under Finnish racing regulations, racecourse veterinarians are required to examine horses after a race only if visible bleeding from the mouth is present.

== See also ==
- Horse welfare reforms
- Bit (horse)
- Bitless bridle
- Crop (implement)

== Bibliography ==
- Björnsdóttir, Sigríður; Frey, Rebecka; Kristjansson, Thorvaldur; Lundström, Torbjörn (2014). "Bit-related lesions in Icelandic competition horses". Acta Veterinaria Scandinavica. 56 (1): 40. doi:10.1186/s13028-014-0040-8. ISSN 1751-0147. PMC 4236600. PMID 25116656.
- Cook, W. (2006). The effect of the bit on the behaviour of the horse. S2CID 196591934.
- Cook, W. R.; Kibler, W. (2019). "Behavioural assessment of pain in 66 horses, with and without a bit". Equine Veterinary Education. 31 (10): 551–560. doi:10.1111/eve.12916. ISSN 0957-7734.
- Mellor, David J. (2020). "Mouth Pain in Horses: Physiological Foundations, Behavioural Indices, Welfare Implications, and a Suggested Solution". Animals. 10 (4): 572. doi:10.3390/ani10040572. ISSN 2076-2615. PMC 7222381. PMID 32235343.
- Tell, Anna; Egenvall, Agneta; Lundström, Torbjörn; Wattle, Ove (2008). "The prevalence of oral ulceration in Swedish horses when ridden with bit and bridle and when unridden". The Veterinary Journal. 178 (3): 405–410. doi:10.1016/j.tvjl.2008.09.020. ISSN 1090-0233. PMID 19027332.
- Tuomola, Kati; Mäki-Kihniä, Nina; Kujala-Wirth, Minna; Mykkänen, Anna (2019). "Oral Lesions in the Bit Area in Finnish Trotters After a Race: Lesion Evaluation, Scoring, and Occurrence". Frontiers in Veterinary Science. 6 206. doi:10.3389/fvets.2019.00206. ISSN 2297-1769. PMC 6640207. PMID 31355213.
- Tuomola, Kati; Mäki-Kihniä, Nina; Valros, Anna; Mykkänen, Anna (2021). "Bit-Related Lesions in Event Horses After a Cross-Country Test". Frontiers in Veterinary Science. 8 (2297–1769) 651160. Veterinary Science. doi:10.3389/fvets.2021.651160. PMC 8044447. PMID 33869325.
- Henry, Guillaume (2017). L'usage des mains (in French). Humensis. ISBN 978-2-410-01052-7.
