= Ring bit =

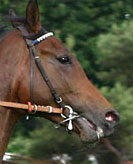
A half spoon Dexter ring bit on a race horse in Germany

A ring bit is a horse bit that includes a ring passed through the horse's mouth and encircling the lower jaw. There are three primary designs. The most common ring bit design today, sometimes called a Dexter ring bit, is used in conjunction with a snaffle bit, while a historic ring bit design was also used on some spade bits in certain vaquero traditions originating in Mexico. A third style is a simple ring, the Tattersall or yearling bit, used alone on a bridle, usually for use in-hand.

Today, the Dexter ring bit is the most common, used primarily in horse racing. Most snaffle-based ring bits have a jointed mouthpiece, with the ring linked to the bit rings or lower cheeks.

In parts of western North America influenced by the vaquero tradition of Spain and Mexico, a spade bit called a ring bit had a metal ring that fastened at the highest point of the port or spoon of the bit mouthpiece passed through the horse's mouth, and surrounded the lower jaw. This design was more common in the Southwest than in the Northwest, and gradually disappeared from both areas, but remained in general use in Mexico.

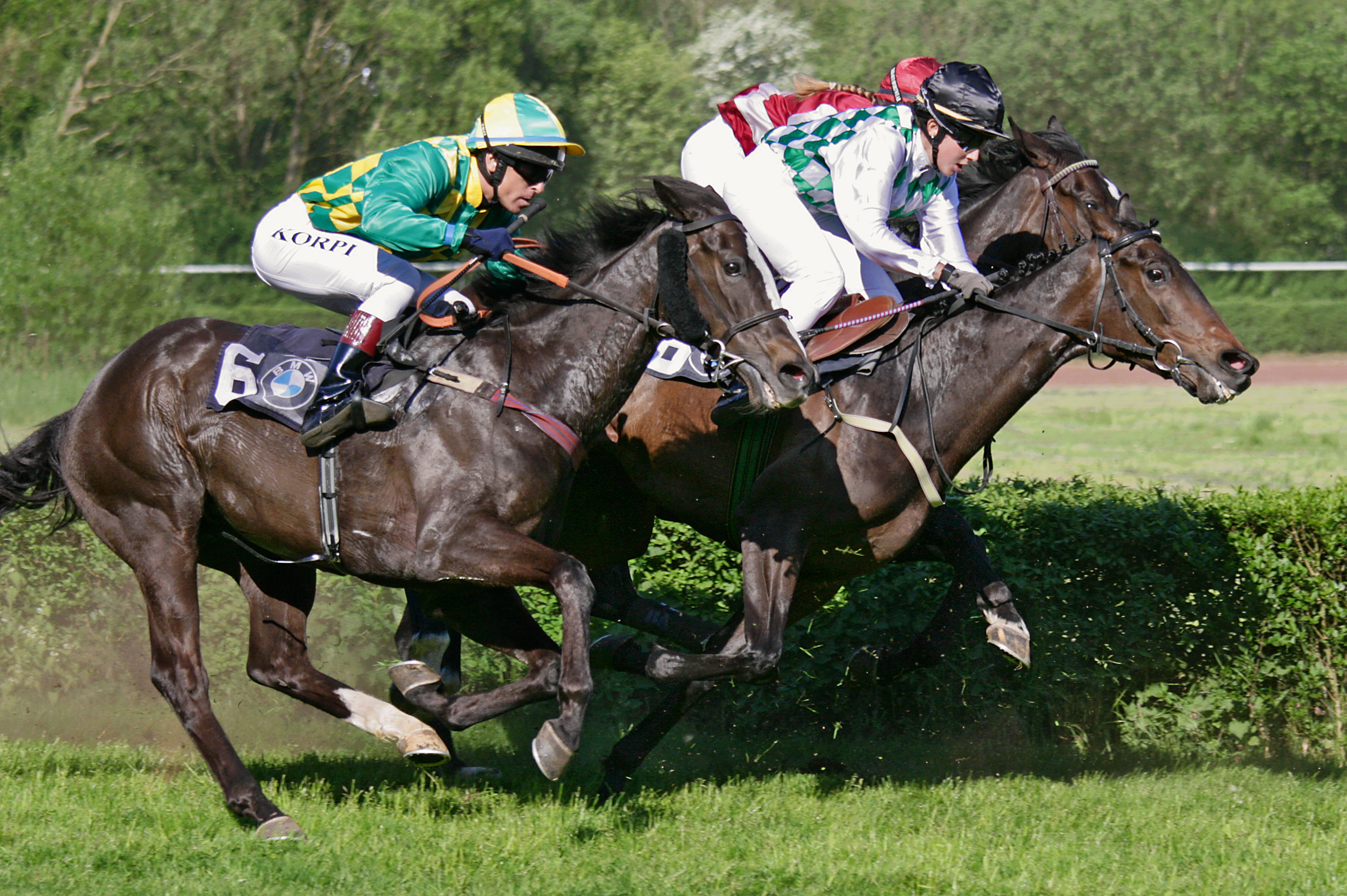
Horses racing, front horse in a snaffle bit, rear horse in a ring bit

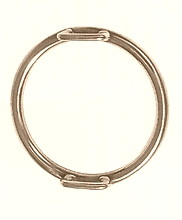
A Tattersall bit that is used for leading young horses.

Another form of ring bit is the circular metal bit that is known as a Tattersall (or yearling) ring bit which attaches to the headstall and used for leading young horses. A variation of this bit has metal players (or keys) hanging from it.
