= Ngaio Beausoleil =

New Zealand animal welfare researcher

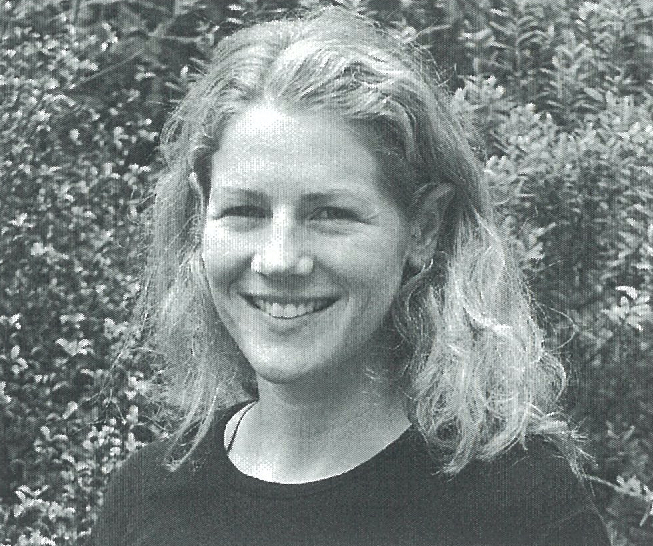
- Beausoleil in 2005

Academic background
- Education: Massey University
- Thesis: Behavioural and physiological responses of domestic sheep (Ovis aries) to the presence of humans and dogs (2006)
- Doctoral advisor: David Mellor, Kevin Stafford

Ngaio Jessica Beausoleil is a New Zealand academic, and a full professor at Massey University, specialising in animal welfare and the cross-disciplinary field of conservation welfare.

== Academic career ==
Beausoleil completed a PhD titled Behavioural and physiological responses of domestic sheep (Ovis aries) to the presence of humans and dogs at the Massey University. Beausoleil then joined the faculty of Massey University, rising to full professor in 2023. She is Co-Director of the Animal Welfare Science and Bioethics Centre at the university.

Beausoleil is Chair of the editorial board of the New Zealand Veterinary Journal, the first woman and non-veterinarian to hold the position. She serves as scientific expert on the Australia New Zealand Council for the Care of Animals in Research and Teaching. In 2020 she was involved in a review of the Victoria State Government's Wildlife Act, as international expert.

Beausoleil's research focuses on animal welfare, and is a leader in the field of conservation welfare, which attempts to understand and mitigate human effects on wildlife. She co-led the development of the 'Five Domains' model of animal welfare, which has been widely adopted both in New Zealand and overseas. She was part of a team that developed a protocol for assessing animal welfare in wild animals. With colleague David Mellor, she has reviewed the welfare of horses during exercise, describing how bridles with bits may increase animal breathlessness and therefore both cause welfare issues and decrease athletic performance. She has also commented on the animal welfare of fast-growing broiler chickens, in comparison to slower-growing breeds, and how animal welfare law could be improved.

== Selected works ==
- Mellor, David; Beausoleil, Ngaio (2015). "Extending the 'Five Domains' model for animal welfare assessment to incorporate positive welfare states". Animal Welfare. 24 (3): 241–253. doi:10.7120/09627286.24.3.241. Wikidata Q123423189.
- Mellor, David; Beausoleil, Ngaio; Littlewood, Katherine E.; McLean, Andrew; McGreevy, Paul; Bidda Jones; Cristina Wilkins (2020). "The 2020 Five Domains Model: Including Human-Animal Interactions in Assessments of Animal Welfare". Animals. 10 (10). doi:10.3390/ani10101870. PMC 7602120. PMID 33066335. Wikidata Q100689100.
- Sara Dubois; Nicole Fenwick; Erin A Ryan; et al. (2017). "International consensus principles for ethical wildlife control". Conservation Biology. 31 (4): 753–760. doi:10.1111/cobi.12896. PMID 28092422. Wikidata Q46432082.
- Beausoleil, Ngaio; D. J. Mellor (2014). "Introducing breathlessness as a significant animal welfare issue". New Zealand Veterinary Journal. 63 (1): 44–51. doi:10.1080/00480169.2014.940410. PMID 25004795. Wikidata Q38227337.
- Beausoleil, Ngaio; Blache, Dominique; Kevin J. Stafford; Mellor, David; Alasdair D.L. Noble (2008). "Exploring the basis of divergent selection for 'temperament' in domestic sheep". Applied Animal Behaviour Science. 109 (2–4): 261–274. doi:10.1016/j.applanim.2007.03.013. Wikidata Q60549007.
- M J Guesgen; Beausoleil, Ngaio; M Leach; E O Minot; M Stewart; K J Stafford (2016). "Coding and quantification of a facial expression for pain in lambs". Behavioural Processes. 132: 49–56. doi:10.1016/j.beproc.2016.09.010. PMID 27693533. Wikidata Q39331823.
- Sally L Sherwen; Lauren M Hemsworth; Beausoleil, Ngaio; Amanda Embury; Mellor, David (2018). "An Animal Welfare Risk Assessment Process for Zoos". Animals. 8 (8). doi:10.3390/ani8080130. PMC 6116011. PMID 30060544. Wikidata Q90639990.
