= Bit (horse) =

Horse equipment that fits in the mouth and is used to direct the horse

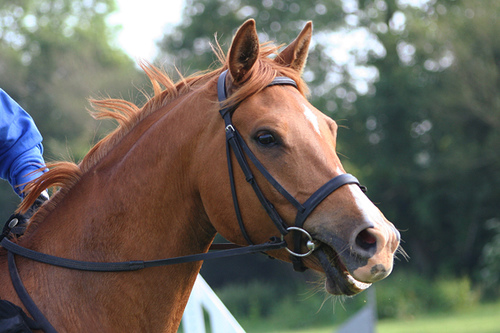
A horse wearing an English bridle with a snaffle bit, the end of which can be seen just sticking out of the mouth. The bit is not the metal ring.

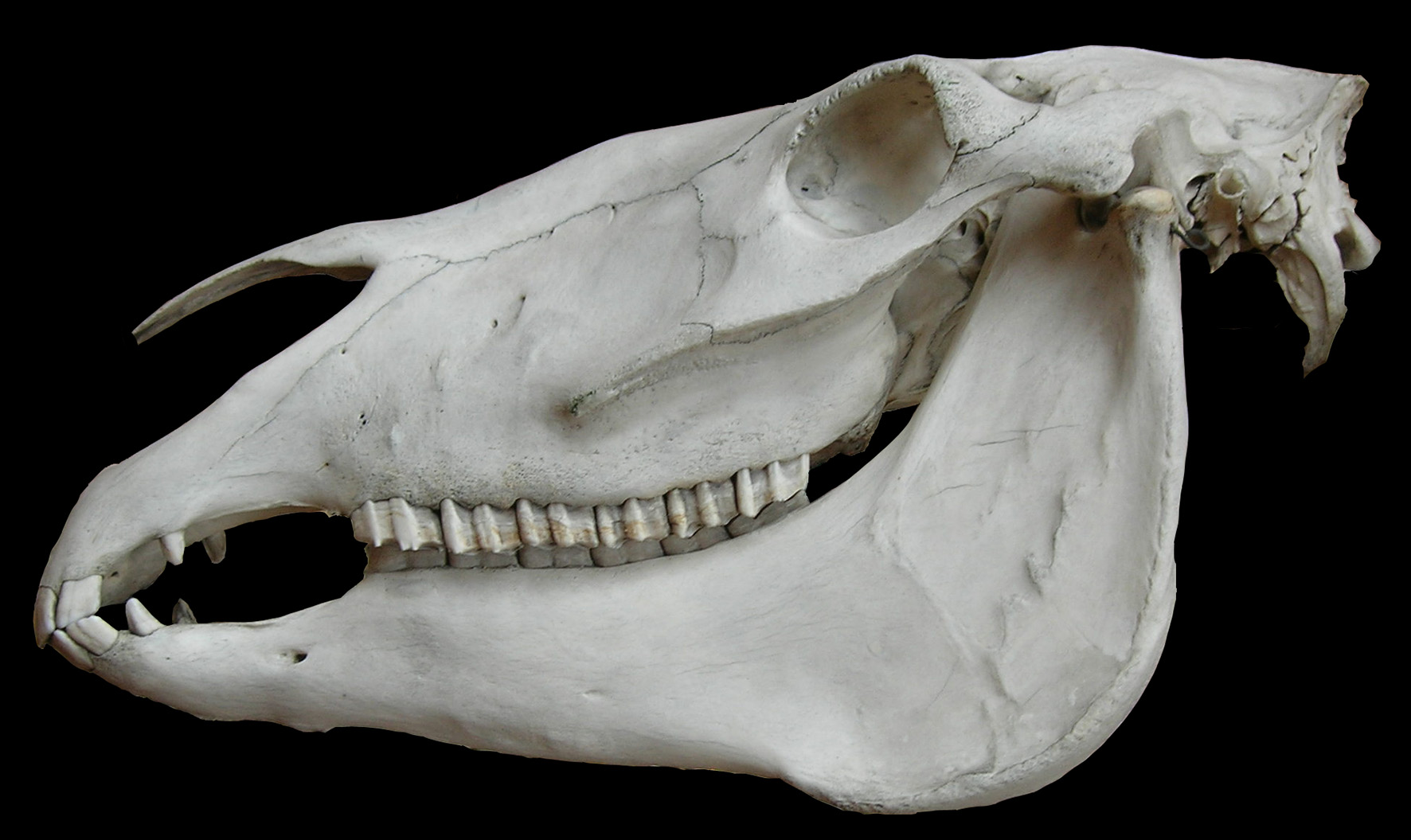
Horse skull showing the large gap between the front teeth and the back teeth. The bit sits in this gap, and extends beyond from side to side.

The bit is an item of a horse's tack. It usually refers to the assembly of components that contacts and controls the horse's mouth, and includes the cheekpieces and mouthpiece, all described here below, but it also sometimes simply refers to the mullen, the piece that fits inside the horse's mouth. The mullen extends across the horse's mouth and rests on the bars, the region between the incisors and molars where there are no teeth. The bit is located on the horse's head by the headstall, and which has itself several components to allow the most comfortable adjustment of bit location and control.

The bit, bridle and reins function together to give control of the horse's head to the rider. The bit applies pressure to the horse's mouth, and reinforces the other control signals from the rider's legs and weight distribution. A well schooled horse needs little pressure on the bit from a skilled rider. Studies have indicated that soft, consistent bit contact between the rider and horse causes the animal less stress than intermittent or unpredictable contact.

== Basic types ==
Although there are hundreds of design variations, the basic families of bits are defined by the way in which they use or do not use leverage. They include:

- Direct pressure bits without leverage:
  - Snaffle bit: Uses a bit ring at the bit mouthpiece to apply direct pressure on the bars, tongue, and lips.
- Leverage bits:
  - Curb bit: A bit that uses a type of lever called a shank that puts pressure not only on the mouth, but also on the poll, nose, and chin groove.
- Combined bit
  - Pelham bit: A single curb bit with two sets of reins attached to rings at the mouthpiece and end of the shank. Partly combines snaffle and curb pressure.
  - Kimblewick or Kimberwick: A hybrid design that uses a slight amount of mild curb leverage on a bit ring by use of set rein placement on the ring.
- Double bridle
  - A type of bridle that carries two bits, a bradoon and a curb, and is ridden with two sets of reins is called a Weymouth or double bridle, after the customary use of the Weymouth-style curb bit in a double bridle.
- Non-curb leverage designs:
  - Gag bit: A bit that, depending on design, may outwardly resemble a snaffle or a curb, but with added slots or rings that provide leverage by sliding the bit up in the horse's mouth, a very severe design.
- In-hand bits are designed for leading horses only, and include:
  - Chifney anti-rearing bit: This is a semi-circular-shaped bit with three rings and a port or straight mouth piece used when leading horses. The port or straight piece goes inside the mouth, and the circular part lies under the jaw. The bit is attached to separate head piece or the head collar and the lead is clipped onto the bit and headcollar to limit the severity.
  - Tattersall ring bit
  - Straight bar bit with horseshoe-shaped cheek pieces

Bits are further described by the style of mouthpiece that goes inside the horse's mouth as well as by the type of bit ring or bit shank that is outside the mouth, to which the reins are attached.

Types of headgear for horses that exert control with a noseband rather than a bit are usually called hackamores, though the term "bitless bridle" has become a popular colloquialism in recent years.

== History ==
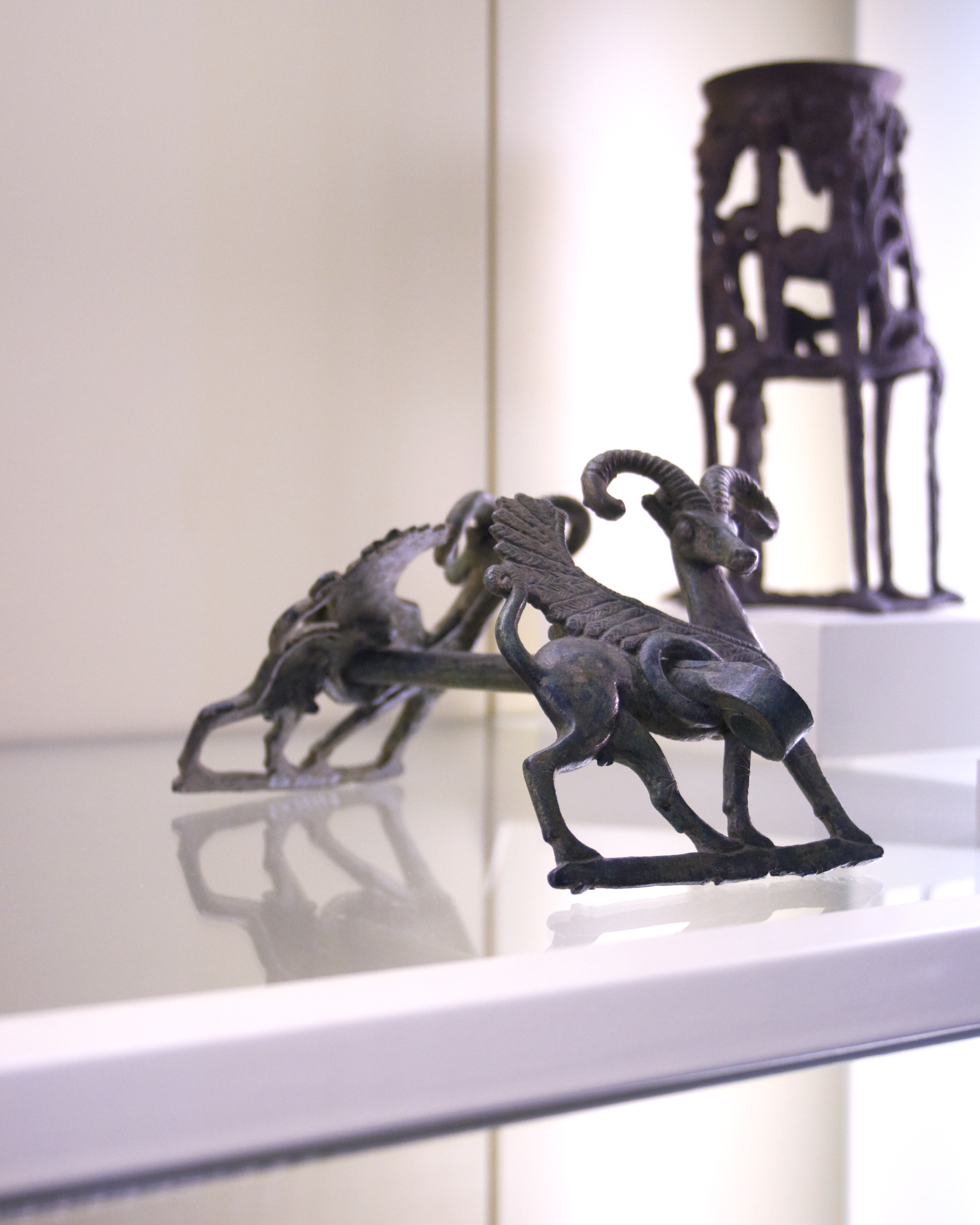
A Luristan bronze horse bit

The riders of early domesticated horses probably used some type of bitless headgear made of sinew, leather, or rope. Components of the earliest headgear may be difficult to determine, as the materials would not have held up over time. For this reason, no one can say with certainty which came first, the bitted or the bitless bridle. There is evidence of the use of bits, located in two sites of the Botai culture in ancient Kazakhstan, dated about 3500–3000 BC.

Nose rings appear on the equids portrayed on the Standard of Ur, circa 2600–2400 BC. To date, the earliest known artistic evidence of use of some form of bitless bridle comes in illustrations of Synian horseman, dated approximately 1400 BC.

The first bits were made of rope, bone, horn, or hard wood. Metal bits came into use between 1300 and 1200 BC, originally made of bronze. In modern times, nickel was a favored material until about 1940, when stainless steel largely replaced it. Copper, aurigan and sweet iron (cold rolled steel) are incorporated into some bits to encourage salivation in the mouth of the horse, which encourages a softer mouth and more relaxed jaw. Bits also can be made of other materials such as rubber or plastic, sometimes in combination with metals.

Throughout history, the need for control of horses in warfare drove extensive innovation in bit design, producing a variety of prototypes and styles over the centuries, from Ancient Greece into modern-day use.

== Design and terminology ==
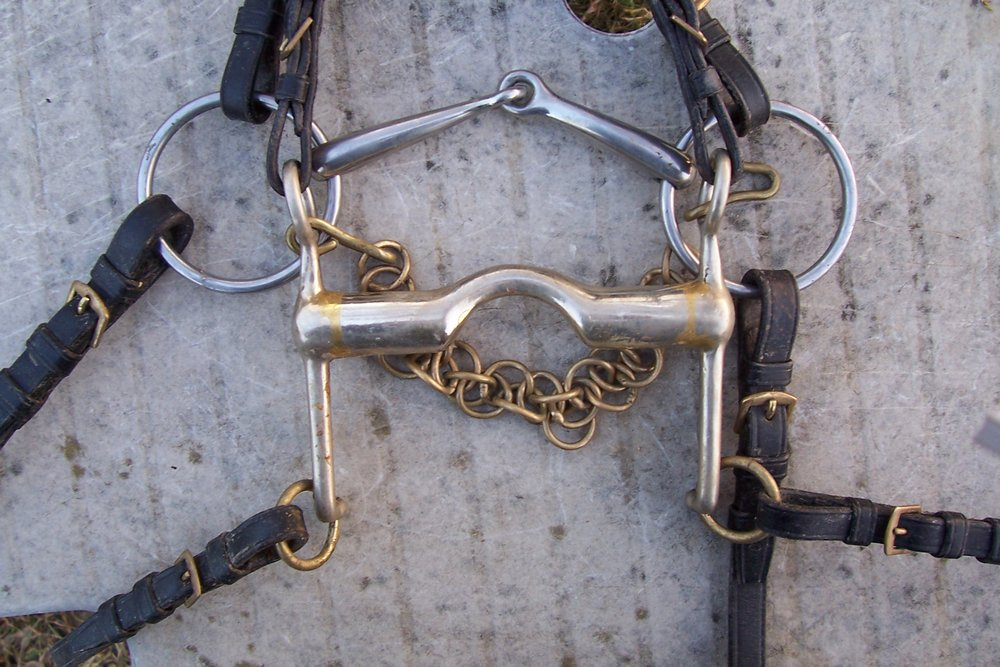
The bits of a double bridle, showing both a type of snaffle bit called a bradoon and a curb bit

A bit consists of two basic components, the bit mouthpiece that goes inside the horse's mouth, and the bit rings of a snaffle bit or shanks of a curb bit, to which the bridle and reins attach. All bits act with some combination of pressure and leverage, often in conjunction with pressure applied by other parts of the bridle such as the curb chain on the chin, noseband on the jaw and face, or pressure on the poll from the headstall. Particular mouthpieces do not define the type of bit. It is the sidepieces and the leverage these rings or shanks use to act on a horse's mouth that determines whether a bit is in the curb or snaffle family, and has a great impact on the severity of the mouthpiece.

The mouthpiece of a horse's bit is the first factor most people think of when assessing the severity and action of the bit. Therefore, it is carefully considered when choosing a bit for a horse. Many mouthpieces are not allowed in certain competitions. Bit mouthpieces may be single jointed, double-jointed, "mullen" (a straight bar), or have an arched port in the center of varying height, with or without joints. Some have rollers, rings or small "keys" that the horse can move with its tongue. Mouthpieces may be smooth, wire-wrapped or otherwise roughened, or of twisted wire or metal.

Various types of metal or synthetic substances are used for bit mouthpieces, which may determine how much a horse salivates or otherwise tolerates a bit; a horse having a moist mouth is considered more relaxed and responsive. Commonly used metals include stainless steel and nickel alloys, which generally do not rust and have a neutral effect on salivation; sweet iron, aurigan and copper, which generally tend to encourage salivation, and aluminum, which is considered drying and is discouraged as a mouthpiece metal. Synthetic mouthpieces may be made with or without internal metal cable or bar reinforcement. Rubber bits are generally thicker than metal bits, but other types of synthetics such as plastics are also used. Plastic-coated bits are often the same size as metal bits, and some are flavored.

Often, bits with shanks that also have single- or double-jointed mouthpieces are incorrectly referred to as snaffles. Because of the presence of a shank, they are actually in the curb bit family.

== Effects ==
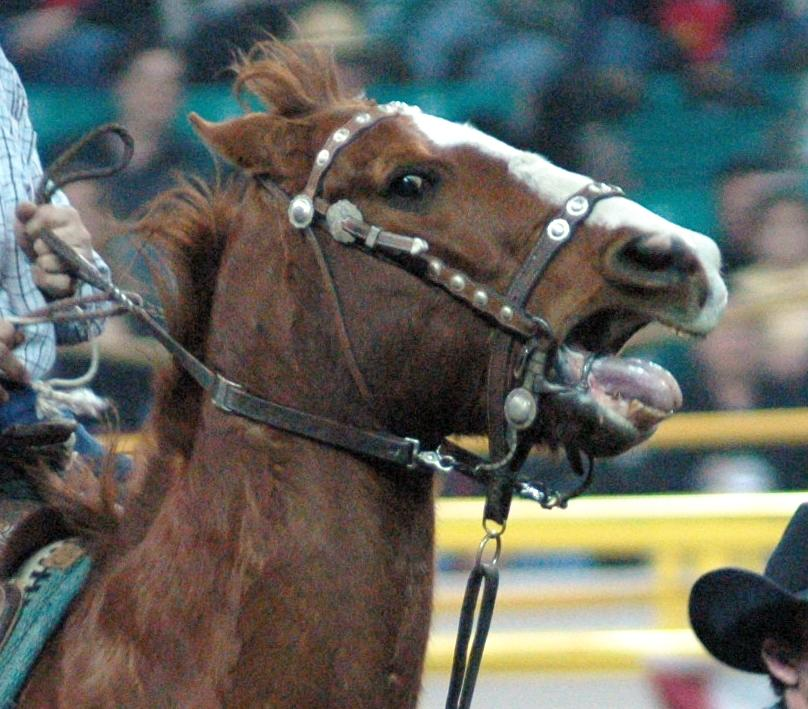
Typical display of pain response to improper or harsh use of a bit

The mouthpiece of the bit does not rest on the teeth of the horse, but rather rests on the gums or "bars" of the horse's mouth in an interdental space behind the front incisors and in front of the back molars. When a horse is said to "grab the bit in its teeth" they actually mean that the horse tenses its lips and mouth against the bit to avoid the rider's commands (although some horses may actually learn to get the bit between their molars).

Depending on the style of bit, pressure can be brought to bear on the bars, tongue, and roof of the mouth, as well as the lips, chin groove and poll. Bits offer varying degrees of control and communication between rider and horse depending upon their design and on the skill of the rider. It is important that the style of bit is appropriate to the horse's needs and is fitted properly for it to function properly and be as comfortable as possible for the horse.

== Snaffle or direct pressure bits ==
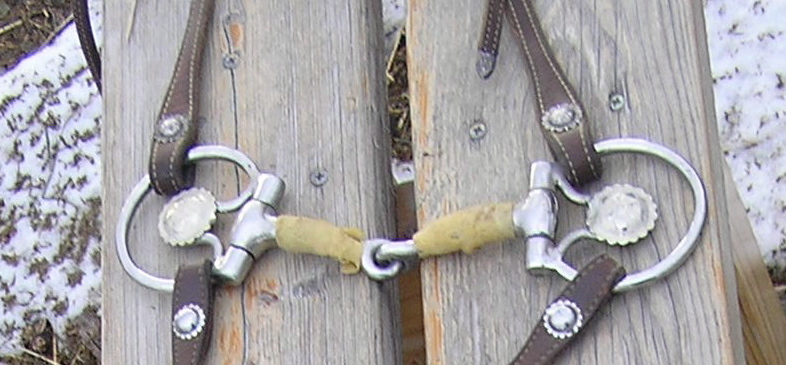
A direct pressure snaffle bit with single-jointed mouthpiece and stylized bit rings

All bits work with either direct pressure or leverage. Bits that act with direct pressure on the tongue and lips are in the general category of snaffle bits. Snaffle bits most commonly have a single jointed mouthpiece and act with a nutcracker effect on the bars, tongue and occasionally roof of the mouth. However, any bit that operates only on direct pressure is a "snaffle" bit, regardless of mouthpiece.

== Curb or leverage bits ==
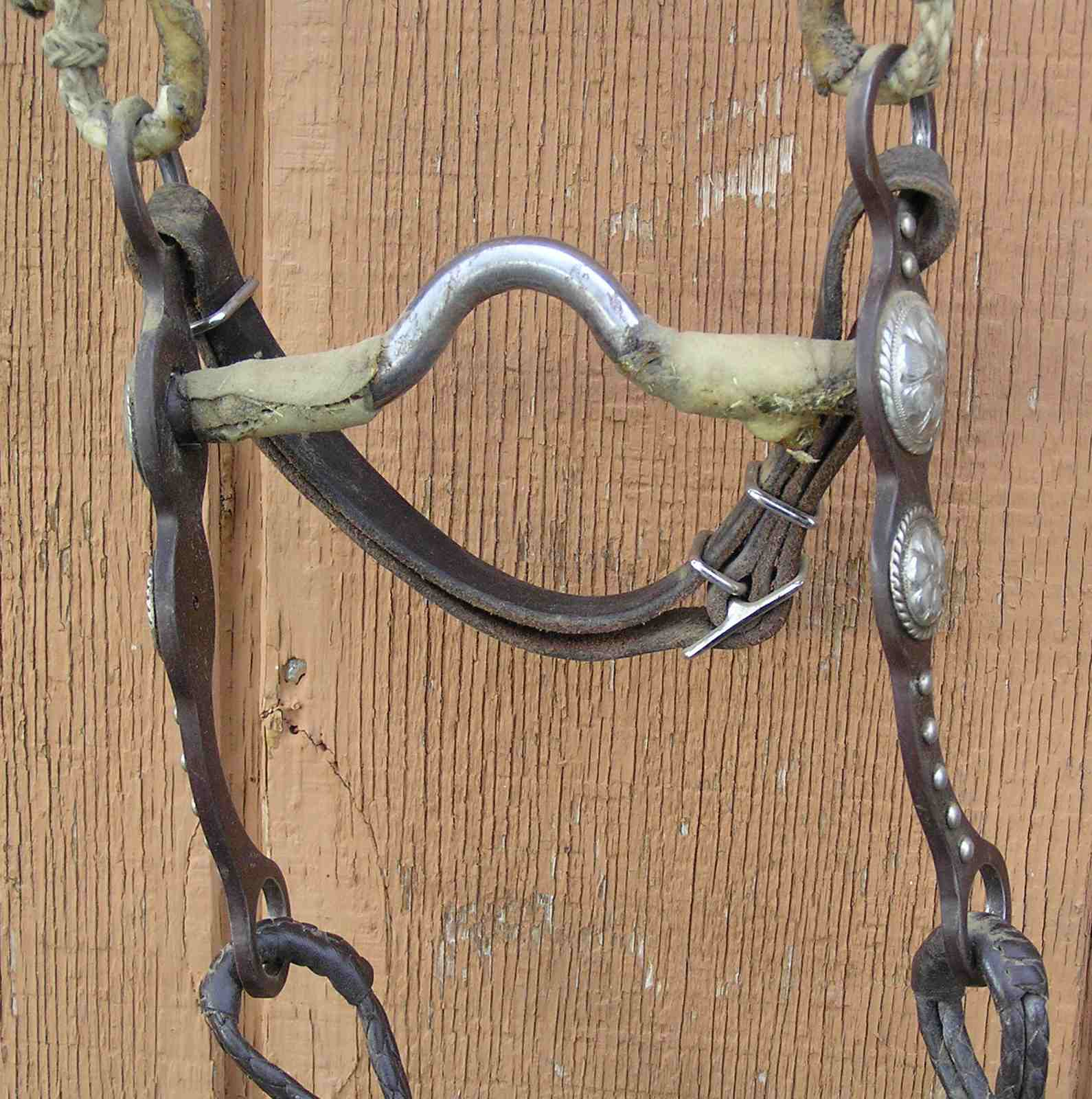
A western style curb bit

Bits that have shanks coming off the bit mouthpiece to create leverage that applies pressure to the poll, chin groove and mouth of the horse are in the category of curb bits. Most curb bit mouthpieces are solid without joints, ranging from a straight bar with a slight arch, called a "mullen" mouthpiece, through a "ported" bit that is slightly arched in the middle to provide tongue relief, to the full spade bit of the Vaquero style of western riding which combines both a straight bar and a very high "spoon" or "spade" extension that contacts the roof of the mouth. The length of the shank determines the degree of leverage put on the horse's head and mouth. Again, a bit with shanks and leverage is always a "curb" type bit, even when it has a jointed mouthpiece more commonly seen on a snaffle (such bits are sometimes—incorrectly—called "cowboy snaffles"). All shanked bits require the use of a curb chain or curb strap for proper action and safe use.

== Combination designs ==
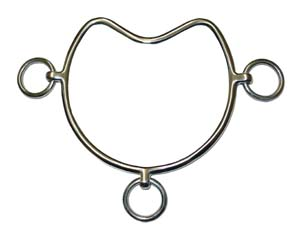
Chifney anti-rearing bit for leading horses

Some bits combine both direct pressure and leverage, the most common examples being the Pelham bit, which has shanks and rings allowing both direct and leverage pressure on a single bit and is ridden with four reins; the Kimblewick or Kimberwicke, a hybrid bit that uses minimal leverage on a modified snaffle-type ring combined with a mouthpiece that is usually seen more often on curb bits, ridden with two reins; and the double bridle, which places a curb and a snaffle bit simultaneously in the horse's mouth so that each may act independently of the other, ridden with four reins. Another bit that combines direct pressure and leverage in a unique manner is the gag bit, a bit derived from the snaffle that, instead of having a rein attached to the mouthpiece, runs the rein through a set of rings that attach directly to the headstall, creating extra pressure on the lips and poll when applied. Usually used for correction of specific problems, the gag bit is generally illegal in the show ring and racecourse.

== Idiomatic usage ==
Bits and the behavior of horses while wearing bits have made their way into popular culture outside of the horse world.

- Took the bit in his teeth, a phrase that describes a horse that sets its jaw against the bit and cannot be controlled (rarely does the horse actually grab the bit with its molars), is used today to refer to a person who either is taking control of a situation or who is uncontrollable and casts off restraint.
- Champing at the bit, or chafing at the bit, meaning to show impatience or burst with energy, refers to a tendency of some horses, when impatient or nervous, and especially if being held back by their riders, to chew on the bit, often salivating excessively. This behavior is sometimes accompanied by head-tossing or pawing at the ground. Because people often saw this behavior exhibited by horses lined up for a horse race before the invention of the starting gate, the term has come to describe a person who is eager to get started or to do something. Some impatient horses will rear when held back, so the related phrase "raring to go" also is derived from observations of equine behavior.

== See also ==
- Bit guard
- Bit mouthpiece
- Bit ring
- Bit shank
- Bitless bridle
- Bridle
- Hackamore
- Horse tongue
- Rein
- Slave iron bit
- Horse pain caused by the bit
