= Bit mouthpiece =

Horse tack

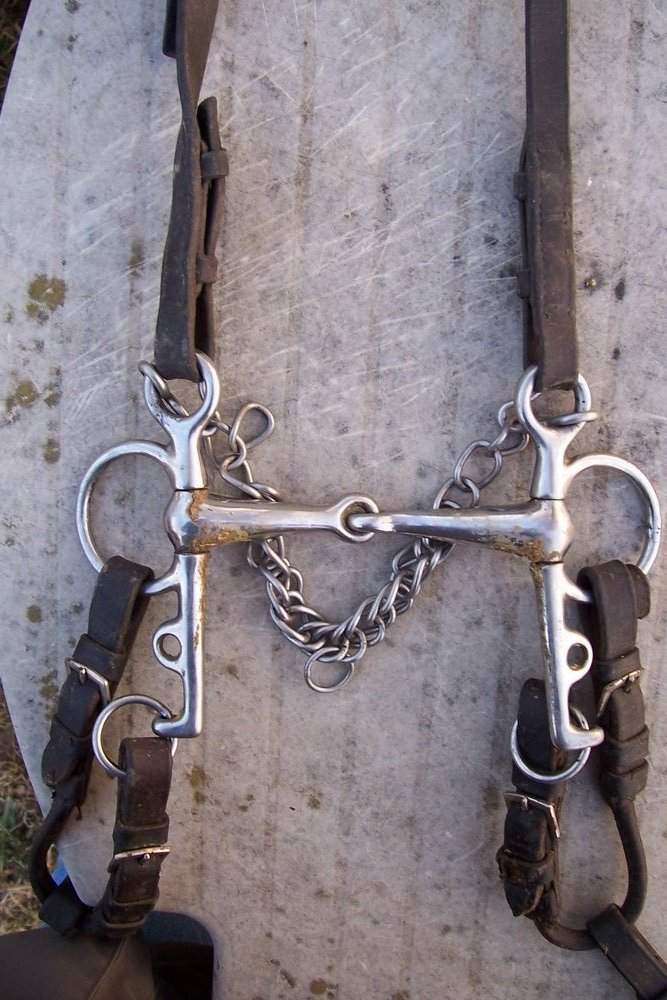
Single-jointed pelham.

The mouthpiece is the part of a horse's bit that goes into the mouth of a horse, resting on the bars of the mouth in the sensitive interdental space where there are no teeth. The mouthpiece is possibly the most important determinant in the severity and action of the bit. Some mouthpieces are not allowed in dressage competition.

The other parts of the bit are the bit rings on a snaffle bit, and the shanks on a curb bit. These pieces do not go inside the mouth, but rather are the parts of a bit that are outside the mouth, where the bridle and reins attach.

== Design concepts ==
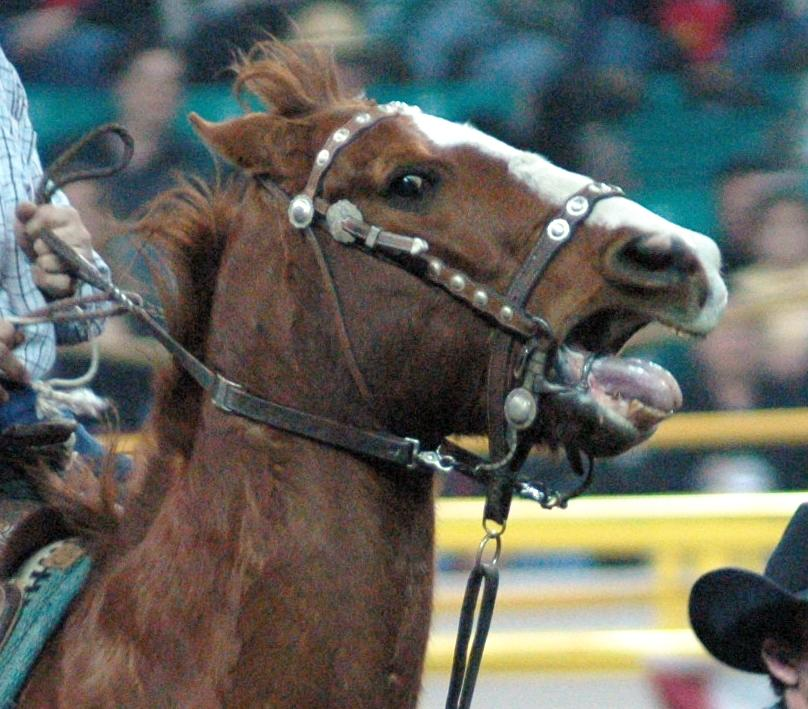
The rider's use of hands is one of the most important factors when determining the severity of the bit

Particular mouthpieces do not define the type of bit. Often, bits with mouthpieces, such as single or double-jointed bits, are incorrectly referred to as snaffles, which in actuality refers to a direct action bit, rather than a leverage bit, and not the mouthpiece. Though some mouthpieces are marked as "severe" and others as "mild", this is all relative. A heavy-handed rider can make even the mildest bit uncomfortable, and a skilled, light rider can ride in a much harsher mouthpiece without damaging the mouth or causing any distress in the horse. Additionally, the type of bit has a great impact on the action of the mouthpiece. Snaffles are generally considered the mildest, curbs and gags the harshest. It is difficult, therefore, to compare a harsher-type bit with a mild mouthpiece (such as a pelham with a rubber mullen mouth), and a milder-type bit with a harsher mouthpiece (like a snaffle with a slow twist). In general, however, the mouthpiece can have a marked difference on the severity. Snaffles with twisted wires are never considered mild, while a pelham with a low port may. In short, many factors in the bitting equation must be considered to evaluate the action and severity of a bit.

Various types of metal or synthetic substances are used for bit mouthpieces, which may determine how much a horse salivates or otherwise tolerates a bit; a horse having a moist mouth is considered more relaxed and responsive. Commonly used metals include stainless steel and nickel alloys, which generally do not rust and have a neutral effect on salivation; sweet iron, aurigan and copper, which generally tend to encourage salivation; and aluminum, which is considered drying and is discouraged as a mouthpiece metal. Synthetic mouthpieces may be made with or without internal metal cable or bar reinforcement. Rubber bits are generally thicker than metal bits, but other types of plastics are also used, often the same size and some flavored.

== Bits without joints ==
=== Straight-bar and Mullen mouth ===
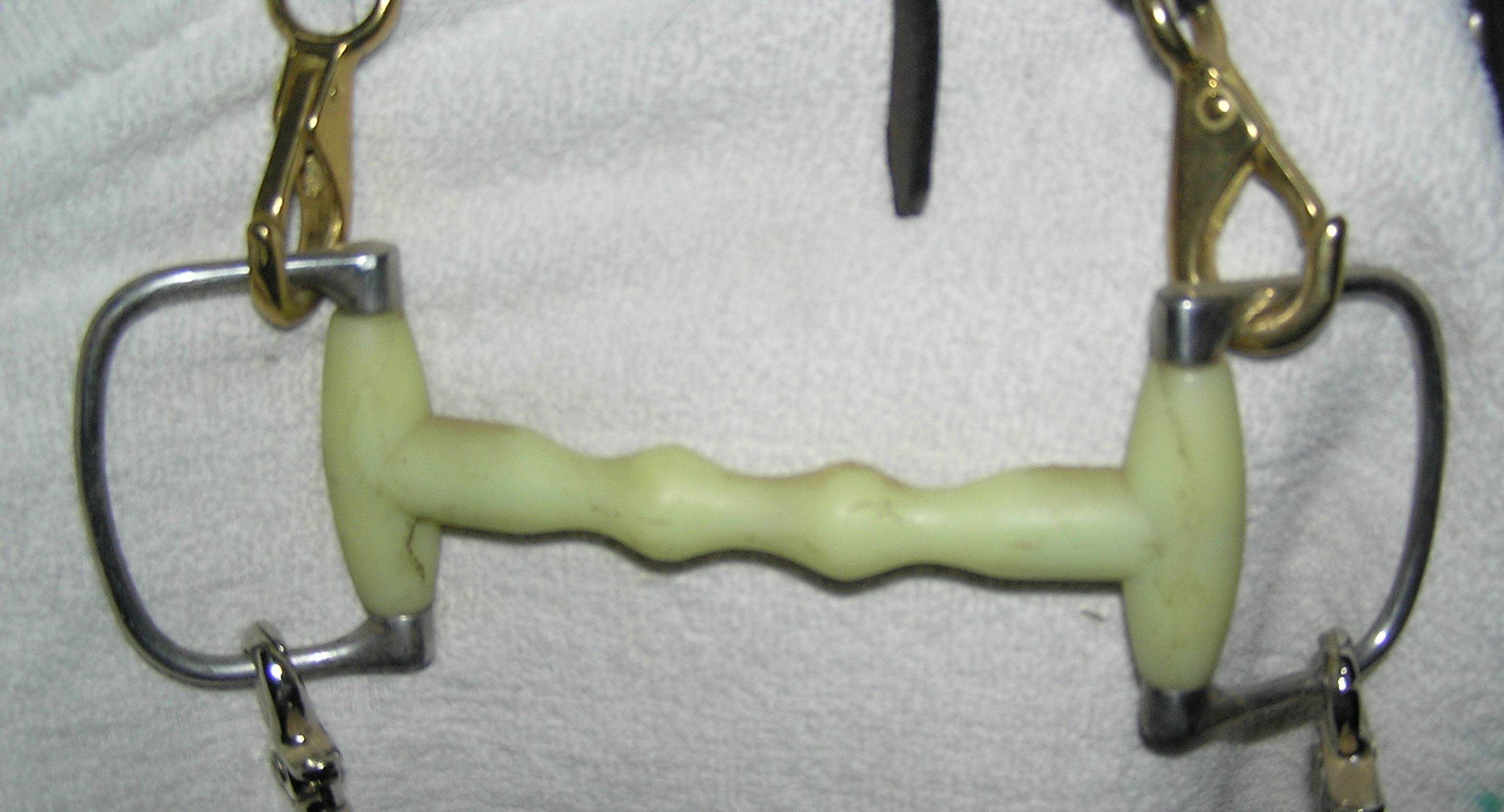
Straight bar mouthpiece

Types of Bits: All types.

What it is: The mouthpiece is a straight bar of material, without any joints or ports. In the mullen mouth, the bar has a slight bow to it, curving gently to allow some room for the tongue.

Action: The mullen mouth and straight bar are fairly similar in action, placing pressure on the tongue, lips, and bars. The mullen provides extra space for the tongue, instead of constantly pushing into it, resulting in more tongue relief, and making it more comfortable, but the mullen does not have as high of a port as a curb, thus does not offer full tongue relief. This bit is generally considered a very mild mouthpiece, although this varies according to the type of bit leverage (snaffle, pelham or curb), and improper use may make it harsh, since the majority of the bit pressure is applied on the sensitive tongue.

Materials: Rubber is very common, as are other synthetic materials. Stainless steel is also a favorite, but copper and sweet iron are not as popular.

Uses: Seen in all equestrian activities, although less commonly in dressage. Usually not as popular for snaffles or gags as for bits that use leverage (pelham, Kimblewick, and curb). The straight bar is common in stallion in-hand bits.

Variants: A variant that is somewhat between the mullen and a low port, seen primarily in western riding is called a "sweetwater" bit and is a very wide, low port slightly more arched than a mullen that offers full tongue relief, puts pressure only on the bars, and is primarily used as a curb mouthpiece. Spade and "half-breed bits also have a straight bar mouthpiece, but with the addition of a port, spoon, or other accoutrements, and thus are not truly classified as a mullen or straight bar mouthpiece."

=== Ported ===
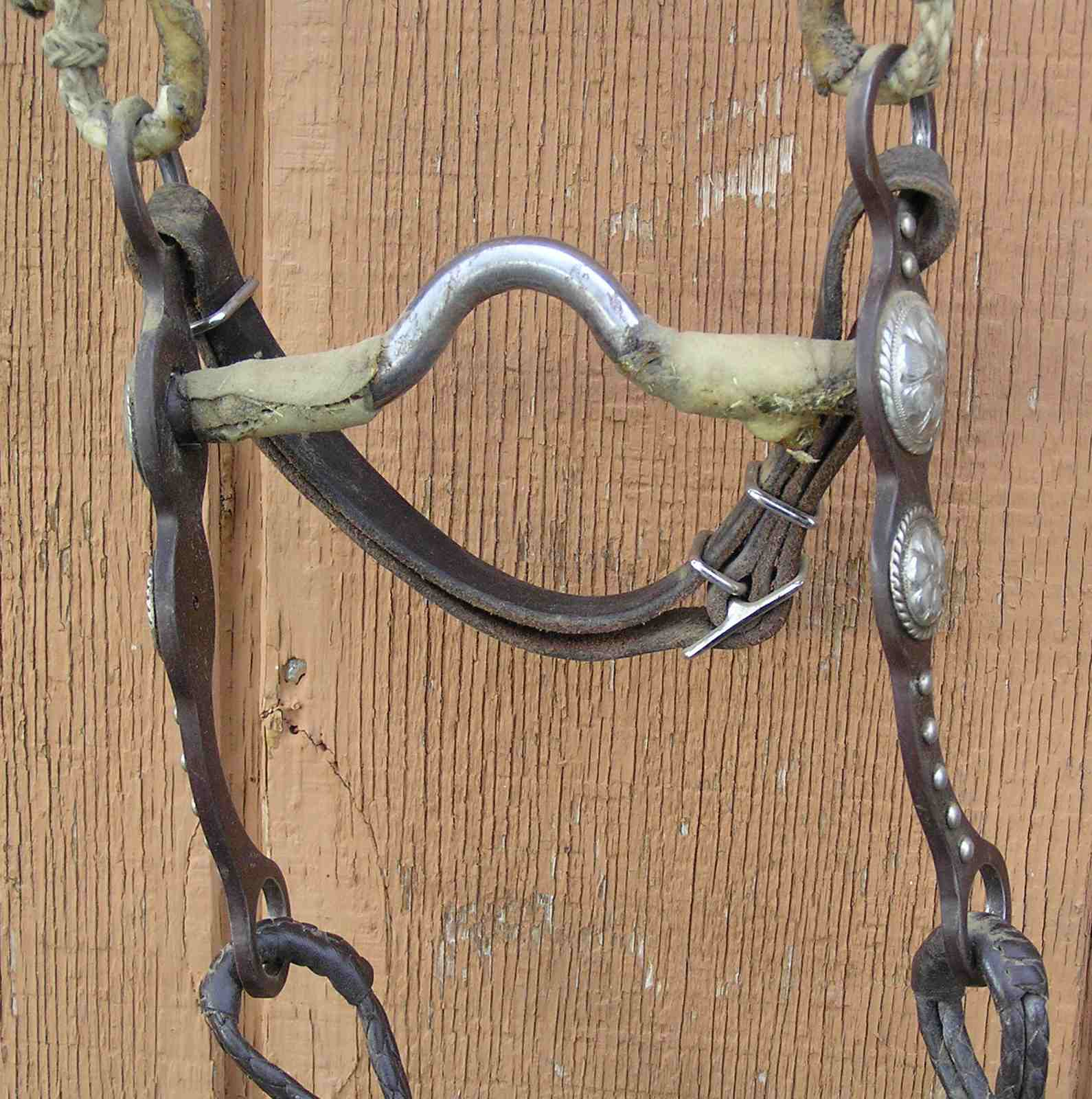
A medium-height port on a curb bit, offering room for the tongue without acting on the hard palate.

Types of Bits: All types, including driving bits.

What it is: The middle of the mouthpiece has a "port," or curve, which may vary in size from "low" to "high." The port is different from the mullen mouth in that the curved portion does not extend the width of the mouthpiece, but is only an inch or two in the center of the bar.

Action: Ported bits act on the lips, tongue, and roof of the mouth, and may apply extra pressure to the bars. The action of the port is directly related to its size. Low ports provide some tongue relief, similar to the mullen mouth, as they provide more space. Larger ports press on the hard palate (roof of the mouth) when the reins are pulled, act as a fulcrum, and transfer that pressure onto the bars. Recent research has shown that the port must be 2-2.5" (5–6 cm) or more in height before it touches the hard palate. Thus the mildest port height is not necessarily the lowest ported bit, as commonly believed; it can also be the highest port possible that does not contact the hard palate.

Materials: Always metal, often stainless steel but also may be sweet iron or copper.

Uses: Very uncommon in snaffles and gags (although it can be found). One of the most common mouthpieces in pelhams, Kimblewick, and curbs. Very popular in the Western disciplines.

== Jointed/single-jointed ==
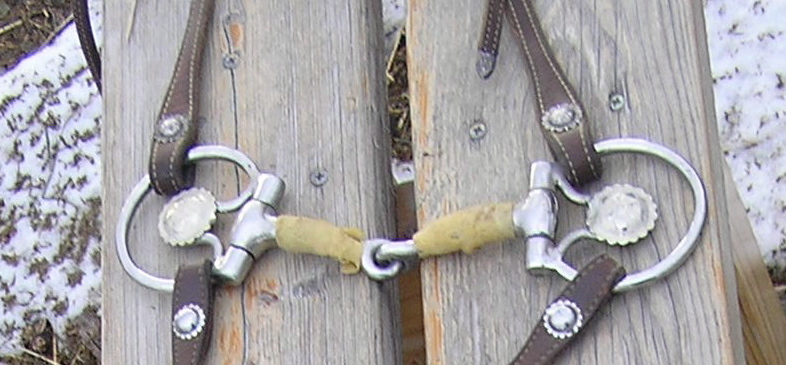
Single-jointed snaffle, mouthpiece wrapped in rubber to make it milder

Type of Bits: Very common on snaffle bits, but seen on all bit families including Kimblewicks, pelhams, gags, and curbs.

What it is: The mouthpiece has one joint in its center. It "breaks" upward toward the top of the mouth with direct pressure, and outward toward the front of the mouth when used with leverage pressure from a bit shank.

Action: The single-jointed mouthpiece applies pressure to the tongue, lips, and bars. Due to the V-shape of the bit when the mouthpiece is contracted, it causes a "nutcracker" action, which has a pinching effect on the bars. It also causes the joint of the bit to push into the sensitive roof of the mouth if used harshly. A single-jointed bit with a curved mouthpiece has a more "U" shape which tends to decrease the pressure on the roof of the mouth.

Materials: often stainless steel, but may be made of any bit metal (copper and sweet iron are both popular), happy mouth material (polyurethane), or have a rubber covering on each joint.

Uses: This is one of the most common mouthpieces found on a snaffle, and is popular for all equestrian sports.

Cautions: Curb bits with a single joint are often called cowboy snaffle, Argentine snaffle, or Tom Thumb snaffle. However, these bits all are actually curb bits because they have shanks and operate with leverage. Thus, when the reins are pulled, the horse is subjected both to the nutcracker action of the jointed mouthpiece and the leverage of the curb, which also causes the jointed bit to rotate and press into the tongue. Therefore, such bits can be very harsh, particularly in the hands of an inexperienced rider. Adding a solid "slobber bar" at the end of the shanks may reduce, but does not eliminate, this problem.

== Double jointed bits ==
Double-jointed bits reduce the nutcracker effect because they conform better to the horse's U-shaped mouth, instead of the "V" created by a single joint. In this respect they are milder, and many horses prefer a double-joint over a single joint.

Many of the double-jointed bits (especially the French link and Dr. Bristol) are occasionally "added to" by twisting the cannons of the mouthpiece. This increases the severity of the bit, as these cannons act directly on the tongue and bars in addition to the regular action of the bit. A relatively "kind" French mouth can therefore be turned into a severe bit when the cannons are twisted or if the mouthpiece is put onto a gag bit. All references below are based on the cannons being smooth, not twisted.

=== The French mouth/ French link ===
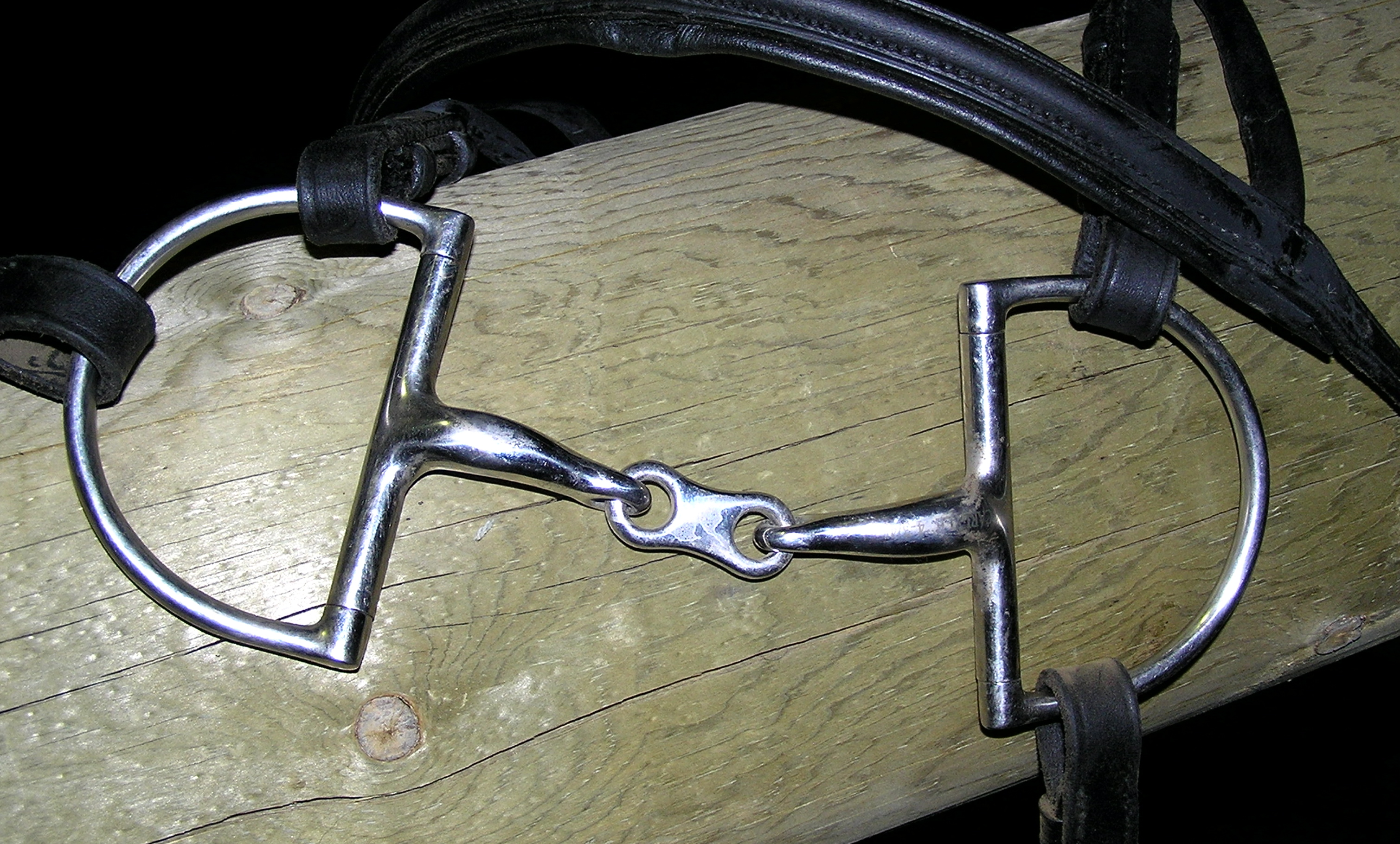
A French Link mouthpiece

Types of Bits: snaffle, gag, pelham, curb (including driving bits)

What it is: The mouthpiece has two joints due to a central link. This link is usually flat, short and has bone-shaped, rounded corners. Some French link snaffles are not flat, but are rounded in the same manner as the rest of the mouthpiece. The flat link is mild when it lays flat across the tongue, but the edge can put pressure on the tongue if a full-cheek version with keepers places the link at an angle. A rounded link does not have this action

Action: One of the mildest mouthpieces, because the two joints reduce the nutcracker effect found in single-jointed bits, and encourage relaxation—applies pressure to the lips, tongue, and bars of the mouth

Materials: Usually stainless steel, also copper (either just the link or the whole bit)

Use: Commonly seen on snaffles, rare in gags, pelhams, or curbs. This is one of the most popular mouthpieces for dressage work. However, it is used in many English-styled disciplines. It is rarely used in the Western-styled disciplines.

=== The Dr. Bristol ===
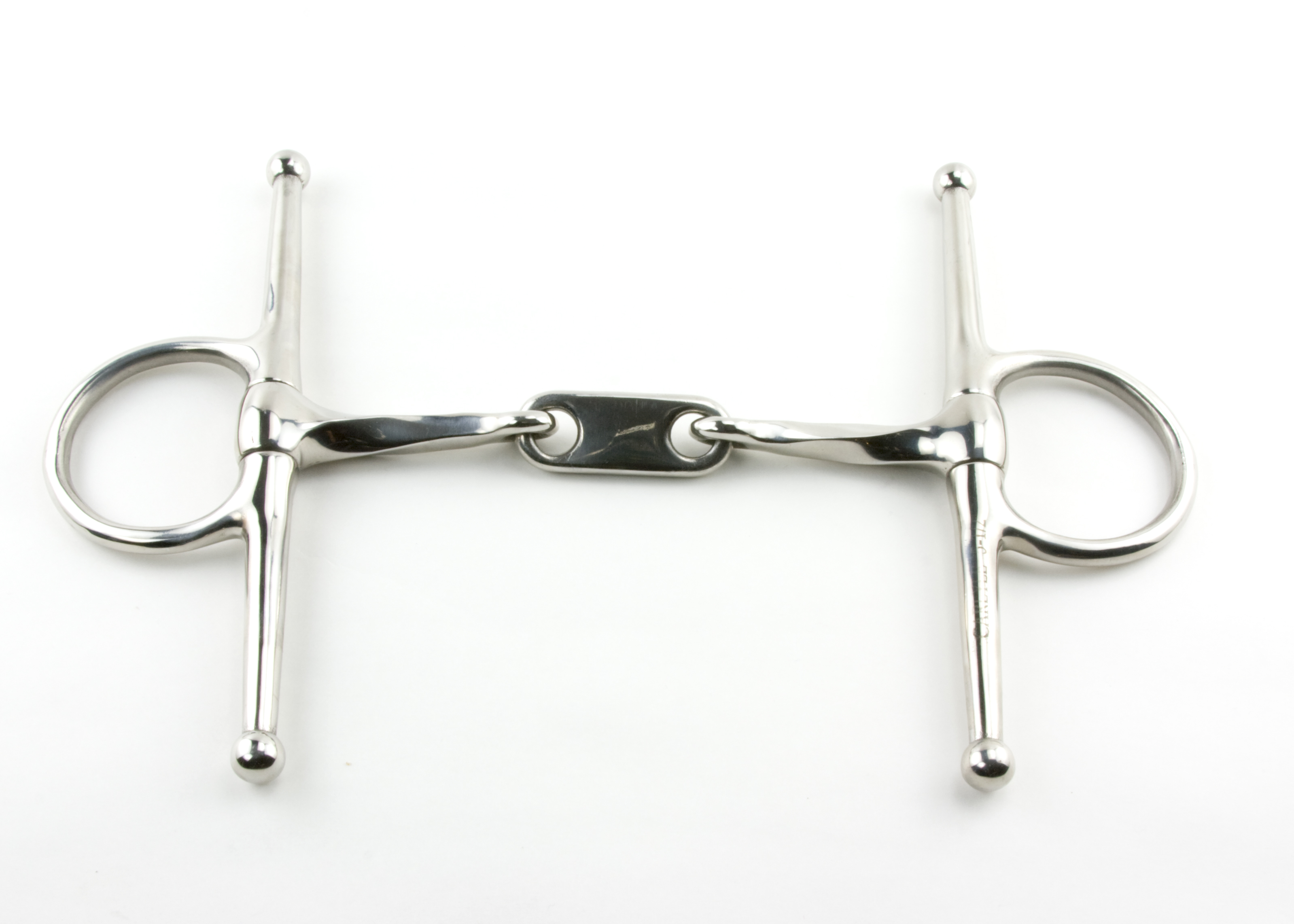
A Dr. Bristol link is flat, but set at an angle when compared to a French Link. This mouthpiece also has a slow twist that increases severity.

Types of Bits: snaffle, gag

What it is: The mouthpiece has two joints due to a central link. This link is flat, but longer and more rectangular in shape than a French link. It is also usually set at a slight angle to the plane of the bit. Its inventor, J.S. Bristol, was purported to have been a dentist.

Action: The double joint reduces the nutcracker effect found in single-jointed snaffles. However, the middle link is angled relative to the side pieces of the bit. As a result, the thin edge of the center link can press into the tongue, creating a very small bearing surface. When a full-cheek Dr. Bristol is used, the bit can be rotated so that the angled middle joint lies flat with its broad side against the tongue; when used this way the bit is relatively mild. This latter method is only possible because bit keepers ensure the bit stays in a fixed position in the horse's mouth, and thus bits that do not use bit keepers (e.g., a D-ring or eggbutt) do not have this milder option.

This bit can put pressure on the tongue, although it also adds pressure to the bars and lips of the mouth. It contains a double jointed mouthpiece similar to the French link, with the center section a flat plate. In its original form, the plate was intended to lie across the whole width of the horse's tongue. Bristol insisted that this bit was intended to be comfortable for the horse because the central plate would lie flat onto the tongue thus lowering the pressure.

The action has been a topic of controversy with many popular texts describing it as having a harsh action due to the plate's edge orientation to the tongue. Academic research has clarified these claims, showing that harsh action occurs when the bit is placed into the mouth such that the feature angle, as defined from a left hand side view, is +45 °. In this sense the bit might be used in two different ways, one such that the plate lies flat to the tongue and is 'mild' (FA = -45 °) and the other such that the plate lies edge-on to the tongue (FA = +45 °) and is 'harsh'.r.

Materials: Usually stainless steel, also copper.

Use: Commonly seen on snaffles, very rare in gags. This bit is seen in many of the English disciplines, but is not used in Western disciplines. Rare in dressage due to its potential severity. Legal for use in the United States, but often not allowed in sanctioned Dressage competition in other nations. Seen in many jumping disciplines.

=== The ball joint ===
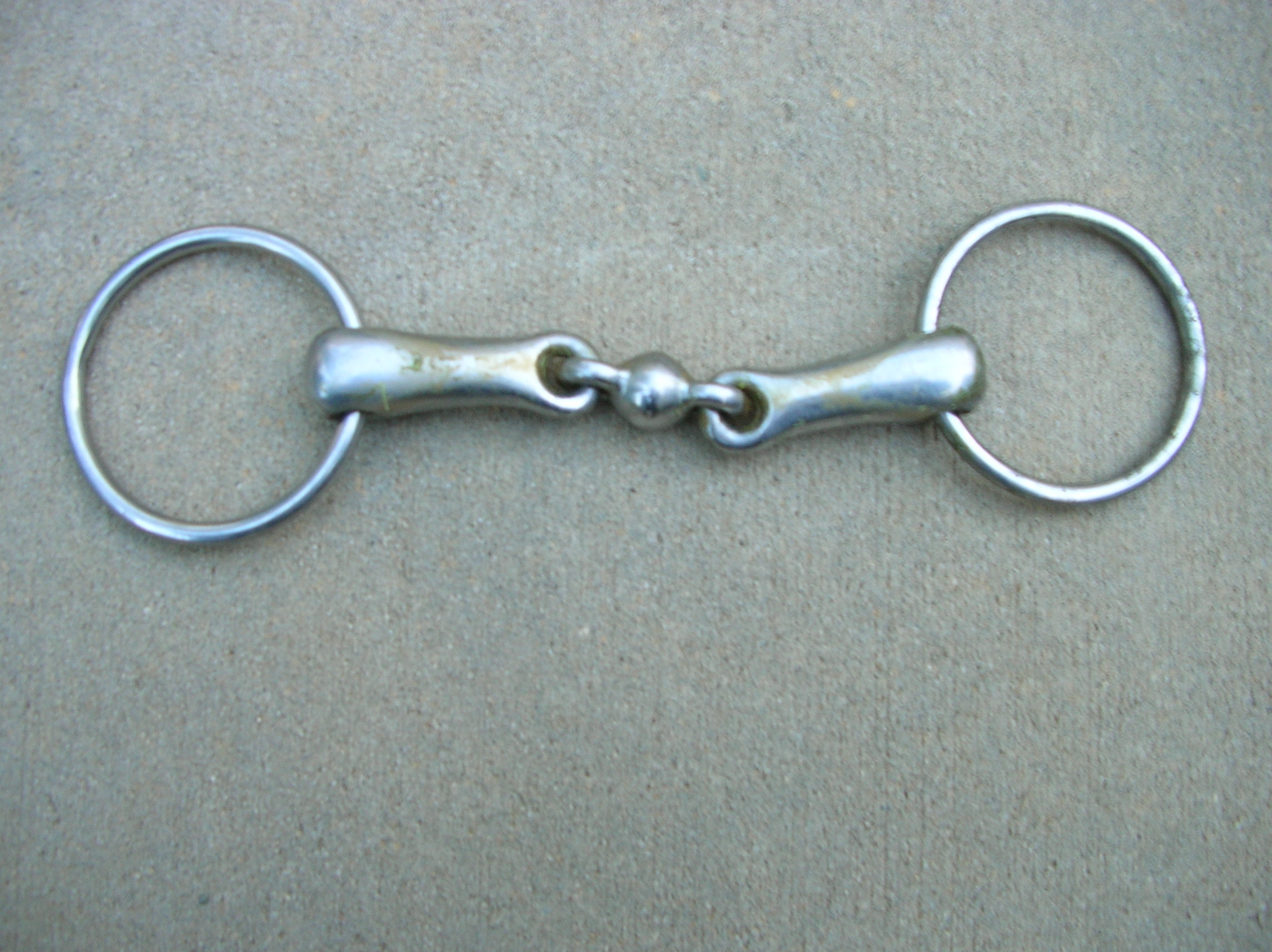
The ball joint

Types of Bits: snaffle

What it is: Similar to the French-link, except there is a round "ball" on the middle link.

Action: double joint reduces the nutcracker effect. The ball tends to concentrate pressure on the tongue. More severe than the French link, less than the Dr. Bristol. Also applies pressure to the lips and bars of the mouth.

Materials: Usually stainless steel

Use: Rather rare type of mouthpiece, seen in the English disciplines. Permitted in dressage.

=== The ported link ===
Types of bits: snaffles

What it is: Double jointed bit similar to a French link, except the middle link has a slight upward (toward the roof of the mouth) curve, like a port.

Action: Similar action as French link, but possibly provides more room for the tongue.

=== The broken Segunda ===
Types of Bits: snaffles, usually with a Dee-ring

What it is: Similar to the ported link, except the middle link is much higher and makes a clear upside-down "U".

Action: Supposed to encourage the horse to soften and stay light in the bridle. The bottom of the "U" can be quite sharp, however, and can dig into the tongue to the point of cutting it. Therefore, they are best left to skilled riders with a very light contact.

== Multi-jointed bits ==
Bits with more than two joints tend to wrap around the lower jaw of the horse. In general, they are considered more severe than double-jointed bits. These bits are not permitted in dressage.

=== Waterford ===
Type of Bits: snaffle, pelham, gag, curb

What it is: The mouthpiece is made of 5-9 joints and is very flexible.

Action: Due to the many joints, the waterford has many bumps, which can act as pressure points. The idea is that the great flexibility discourages the horse from leaning on it.

Materials: Stainless steel.

Uses: Most common in the English disciplines, especially show jumping and eventing. Used mainly on strong horses. Not permitted in dressage, not commonly used in hunt seat riding. Rather rare in a pelham, very rare in a curb bit.

=== Chain mouth ===
Types of bits: gag, curb

What it is: As its name suggests, this mouthpiece is several links of chain.

Uses: Seen in the Western disciplines.

- Note: There are some chain bits made of bicycle chain rather than link chain. These bits are considered by most horsemen to be too severe for use and many categorize them as cruel. These bits are not allowed in competition.

== Twisted/serrated bits ==
All twisted mouthpieces are considered more severe than smooth mouthpieces. In general, they are not appropriate for novice riders or those with harsh or unskilled hands. Neither these nor any bits should be used to the point where they cause bleeding of the horse's mouth.

If a rider believes such a bit would benefit his horse, he should first look at the animal's training and his own skills. Many problems can be resolved through proper training, rather than harsher bitting. Usually, it is the less-skilled riders who find the need to use harsher bits, because they can't control their horses in anything else.

Nonetheless, in some cases, skilled riders can use such bits to their advantage and improve the horse's training. These bits are not permitted in dressage competition, and are generally not used for schooling dressage horses.

=== Slow twist ===
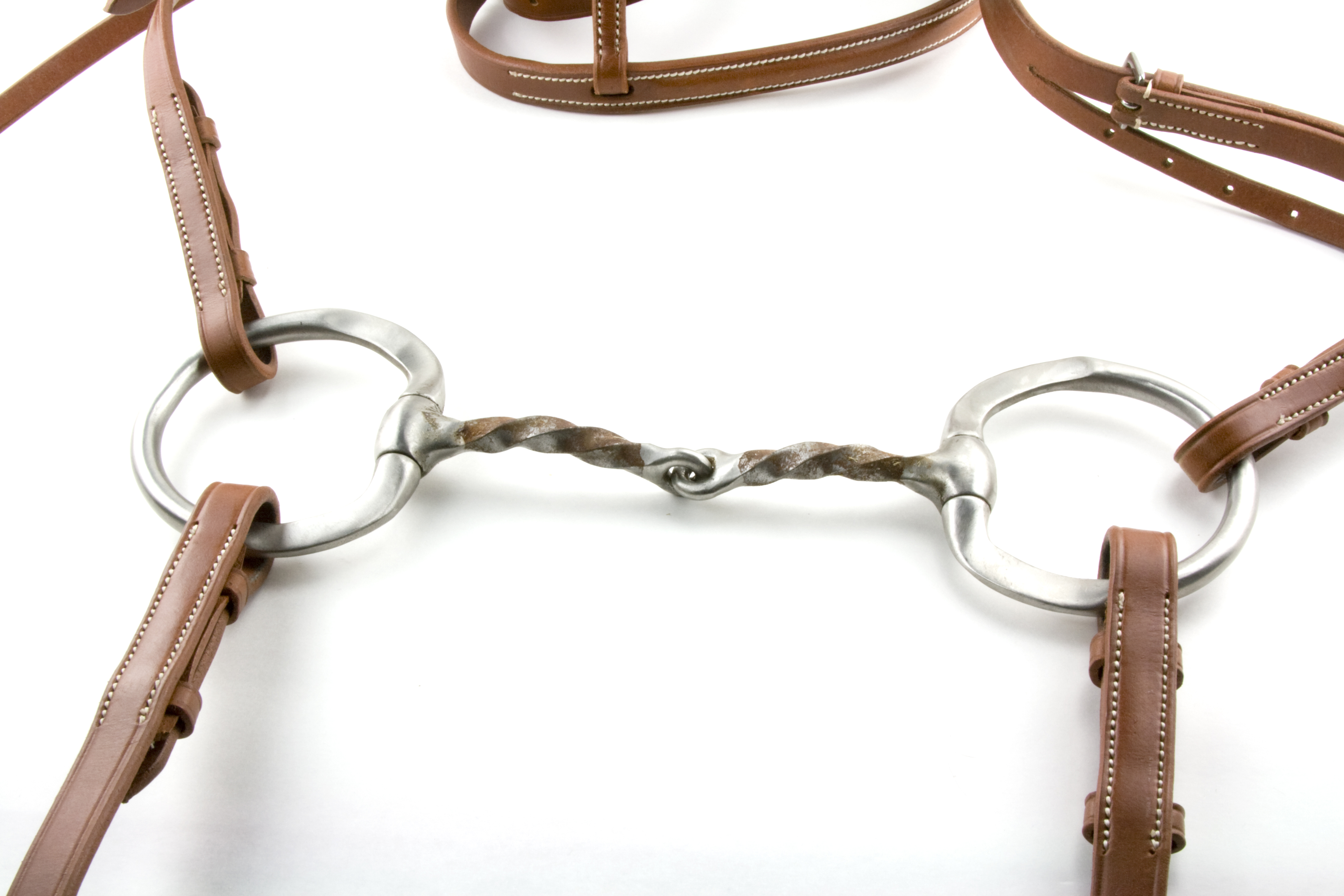
The slow twist is thicker than the twisted wire bits

Types of Bits: Snaffle, pelham, gag

What it is: A mouthpiece (usually single-jointed) with a slight twist in the cannons. Thicker and with fewer twists than a wire bit, has fewer edges than a corkscrew.

Action: The twist causes edges that result as pressure points in the horse's mouth. Increases pressure on the tongue and bars, also acts on the lips. Generally considered strong and fairly severe.

Materials: Usually stainless steel

Uses: Most commonly found on snaffles, quite rare on pelhams and gags. Usually seen in English disciplines. Not permitted in dressage competition.

- Note: The slow twist is often incorrectly used to refer to the corkscrew or a wire bit. These bits are not the same.

=== Corkscrew ===
Types of Bits: Snaffle, driving bits (curbs)

What it is: The mouthpiece (usually single-jointed) has many rounded edges. However, it is not actually "corkscrew" in shape, but more has a more "screw-like" mouthpiece with blunt edges. Thicker than a wire bit, thinner than a slow twist.

Action: The edges amplify pressure on the mouth, especially the bars and tongue. Considered severe.

Uses: Mostly seen in English-type disciplines, and in driving. Not permitted in dressage.

- Note: The name is often incorrectly used to refer to the slow twist or wire bit. These bits are not the same.

=== Single Twisted Wire ===
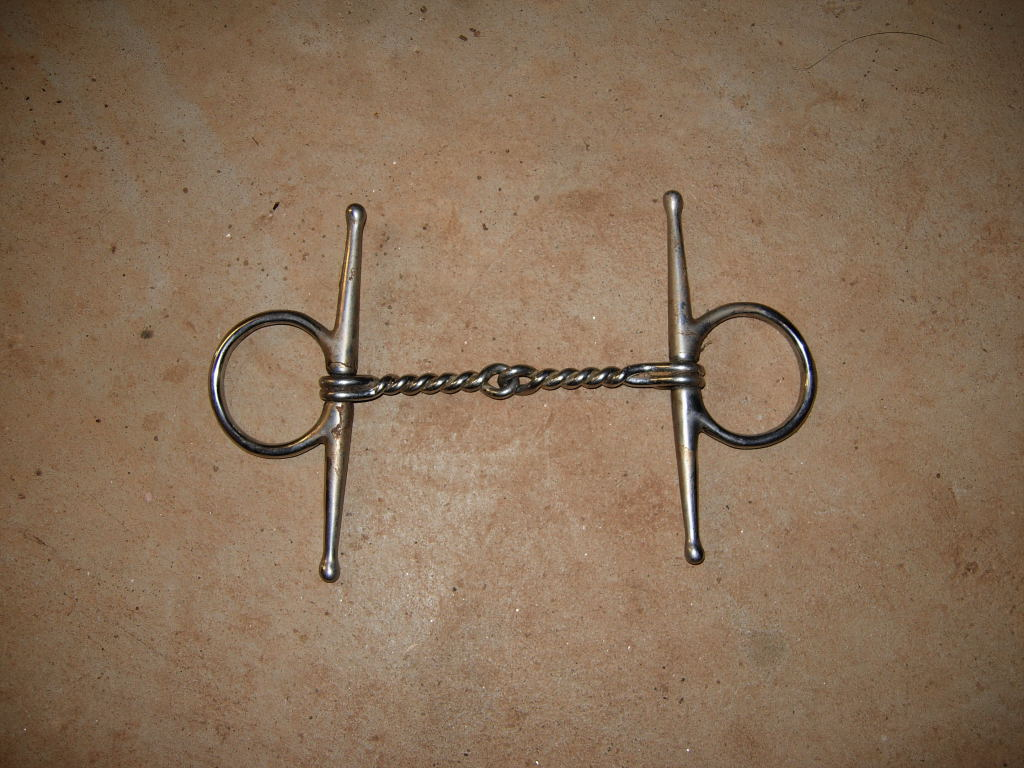
Twisted wire.

Types of Bits: snaffle, gag, curb

What it is: Mouthpiece is a single-jointed bit made of a thin twisted piece of wire for each joint.

Action: The wire bit is extremely severe. It is not only very thin, but it has twists in it that cause pressure points.

Materials: Stainless steel preferred for English disciplines, sweet iron and copper seen in Western disciplines.

Uses: The twisted wire is extremely severe. It is not permitted for dressage. It is more commonly seen in the Western disciplines than the English, although the jumping disciplines occasionally feature wire bits. These bits are for strong horses that pull or take off, and those with "hard" mouths. It should only be used by skilled riders with soft hands. Some people do not use these bits because they believe them to be cruel, although many trainers agree they are appropriate in certain circumstances with particular horses.

- Note: The wire bit is often incorrectly referred to as the slow twist or corkscrew. These bits are not the same.

=== The double twisted wire ===
Types of Bits: snaffle, gag, curb

What it is: Bit has 2 mouthpieces, each one single jointed and made of twisted wire.

Action: The two joints amplify the nutcracker action. The wire makes the mouthpieces thin and sharp. The two mouthpieces cause extreme pressure on the bars. This bit is very severe, and should only be used by skilled riders with soft hands. Some people do not use these bits because they believe them to be cruel.

Materials: Metals, usually stainless steel but also sweet iron and copper

Uses: Not permitted for dressage. Very severe, used on horses that are very strong.

=== The saw chain mouth ===
Types of bits: snaffle

What it is: As the name suggests, the mouthpiece is made out of a piece of chainsaw.

Uses: Extremely severe, and quite uncommon. Most trainers will not use such a bit. Note: due to the extreme severity, most equestrian organizations do not permit this bit in competition.

== The double-mouth/scissors/Barry/"W" or "Y" mouth ==
Types of Bits: snaffle, gag, curb

What it is: Bit has two mouthpieces, each one single jointed.

Action: The two joints amplify the nutcracker action. They also cause extreme pressure on the bars. This bit is very severe, and should only be used by skilled riders with soft hands. Some people do not use these bits because they believe them to be cruel.

Materials: Metals, usually stainless steel but also sweet iron and copper.

Uses: Not permitted for dressage. Very severe, used on horses that are very strong.

== Hollow mouth ==
Types of bits: snaffle, pelham, gag

What it is: A mouthpiece (usually single jointed, but not always) that is hollow in the middle, making it very light. The mouthpiece is usually thicker than average.

Action: The thick, hollow mouthpiece spreads out pressure, thought to make it less severe. However, this effect varies with the mouth structure of the individual horse. Some horses prefer a smaller diameter bit in their mouth because their mouths do not have room for the thick mouthpieces, and in such cases a hollow mouth bit may cause discomfort.

== Roller bits ==
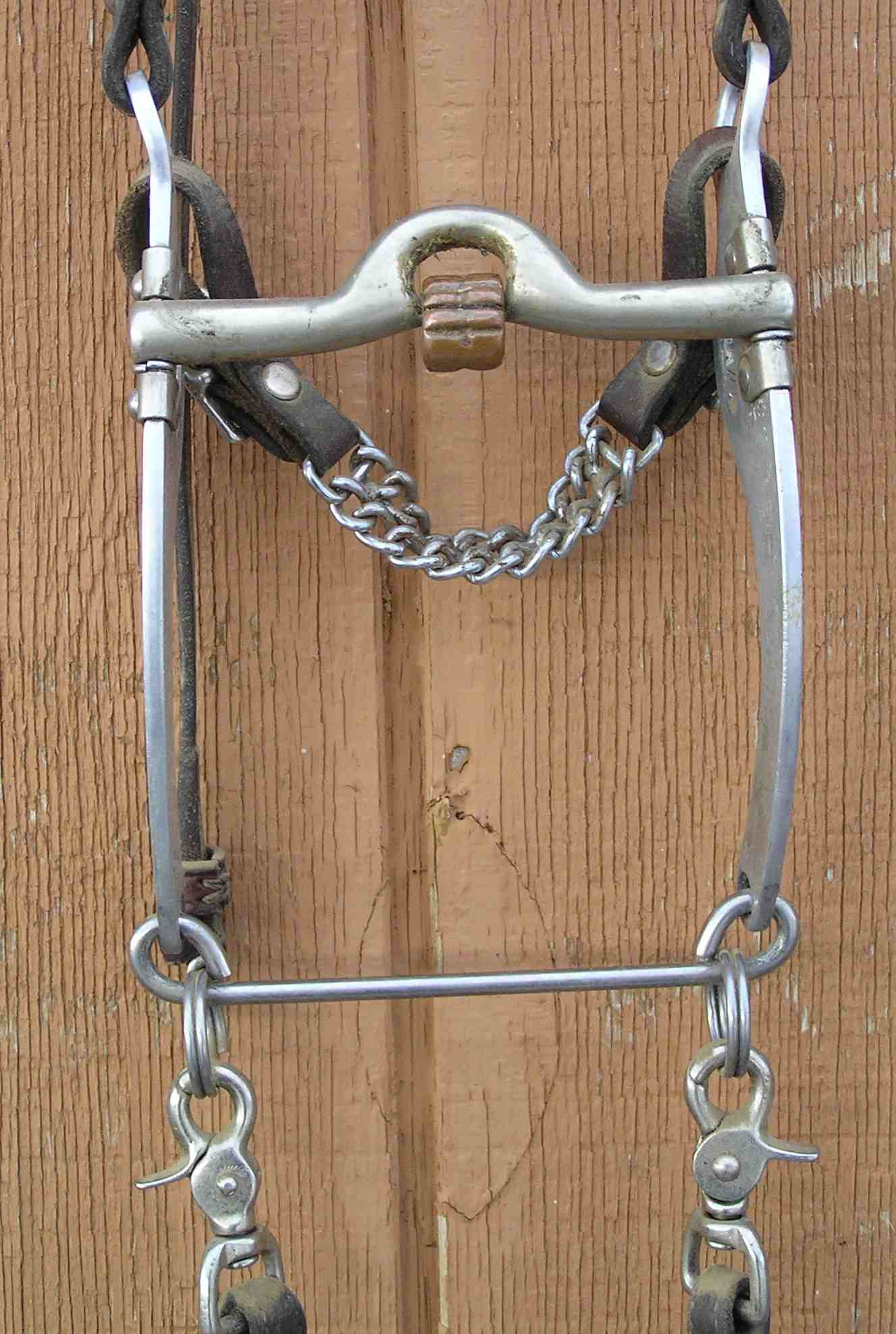
A curb bit with a roller or cricket.

=== The cricket, cherry roller and other roller bits ===
Types of bits: snaffle, curb, gag, pelham

What it is: A cricket is a single roller placed within the port of a curb bit. usually containing copper, often producing a rattling or "cricket-like" sound when the horse moves it around.

The cherry roller bit has multiple rollers along its mouthpiece and may be of steel, copper, or alternate between the two. The mouthpiece may be jointed or straight.

Action: Rollers are supposed to help a horse relax its jaw and accept the bit. They encourage salivation and may also calm nervous horses or provide an outlet for nervous tongue movements. Rollers do not affect the severity of the bit.

Uses: Crickets are very commonly seen on western curb bridles, particularly certain Spanish and California styles such as the spade, half breed, or salinas mouthpieces and are legal for western pleasure competition. Cherry rollers are mainly an English-style bit, but are not permitted in dressage.

=== The Magenis ===
Types of bits: snaffle

Types of Bit rings: Usually eggbutt or loose ring.

What it is: The Magenis is a single-jointed bit with "rollers," or bead-like structures that may spin around, in its mouthpiece. The mouthpiece is squared off.

Action: The rollers are supposed to activate the horse's tongue and help the horse relax and accept the bit. Rollers may also help distract a nervous horse. The edges of the square mouthpiece create pressure points, making the bit severe.

Uses: Seen in the English disciplines, not permitted in dressage. A fairly uncommon bit.

== Key bit ==
Types of Bits: snaffle

What it is: The center of the mouthpiece has short "keys" extending from it, which are movable on the bit. The keys rest on the tongue, below the bit.

Action: The keys are supposed to encourage the horse to relax, as the horse plays with them in his mouth. Mostly used for breaking in young horses.

== Tongue bit/tongue correction bit/tongue port ==
Types of bits: usually snaffle, sometimes pelham

What it is: A flat piece of rubber that slides on a mullen mouth, or a metal bit that already has a flat piece in the center of the mouthpiece. The flat piece is wide and goes backwards in the mouth.

Uses: the purpose of this bit is to prevent a horse from getting his tongue over it. It can be useful in retraining, and for horses for whom this is a habit. This therefore gives the rider more control. Not permitted in dressage.

== Mouthpiece thickness ==
A standard mouthpiece is 3/8 inch in diameter, measured one inch out from the bit rings (the area that usually come in contact with the bars). The common belief is that a thinner mouthpiece increases the severity of the bit, because it decreases the bearing surface and makes the bit "sharper." However, up to a point, some horses perform better with a thinner mouthpiece to a thicker one because there is less metal in their mouth and therefore more room for the tongue. This is mostly true if the rider has soft hands. Thinner mouthpieces are also preferable when using a double bridle, as the horse has even less room for its tongue with two bits in his mouth.

On the other hand, very thin bits (such as the twisted wire bits) have a marked severity over thicker bits. Some wire bits may come in a thickness as low as 1/16 inch, making them extremely severe to the point where it is easy for any rider to cut and ruin the horse's mouth, especially the lips. Many horsemen, even the most skilled riders, will not put such a harsh bit in their horse's mouths. Many equestrian organizations do not allow a bit to be 1/4 inch or thinner in diameter.

If the rider gives crude aids, it is generally best to pick a bit mouthpiece that is thicker. This may also be true with some horses with relatively thin bars.

== Mouthpiece material ==
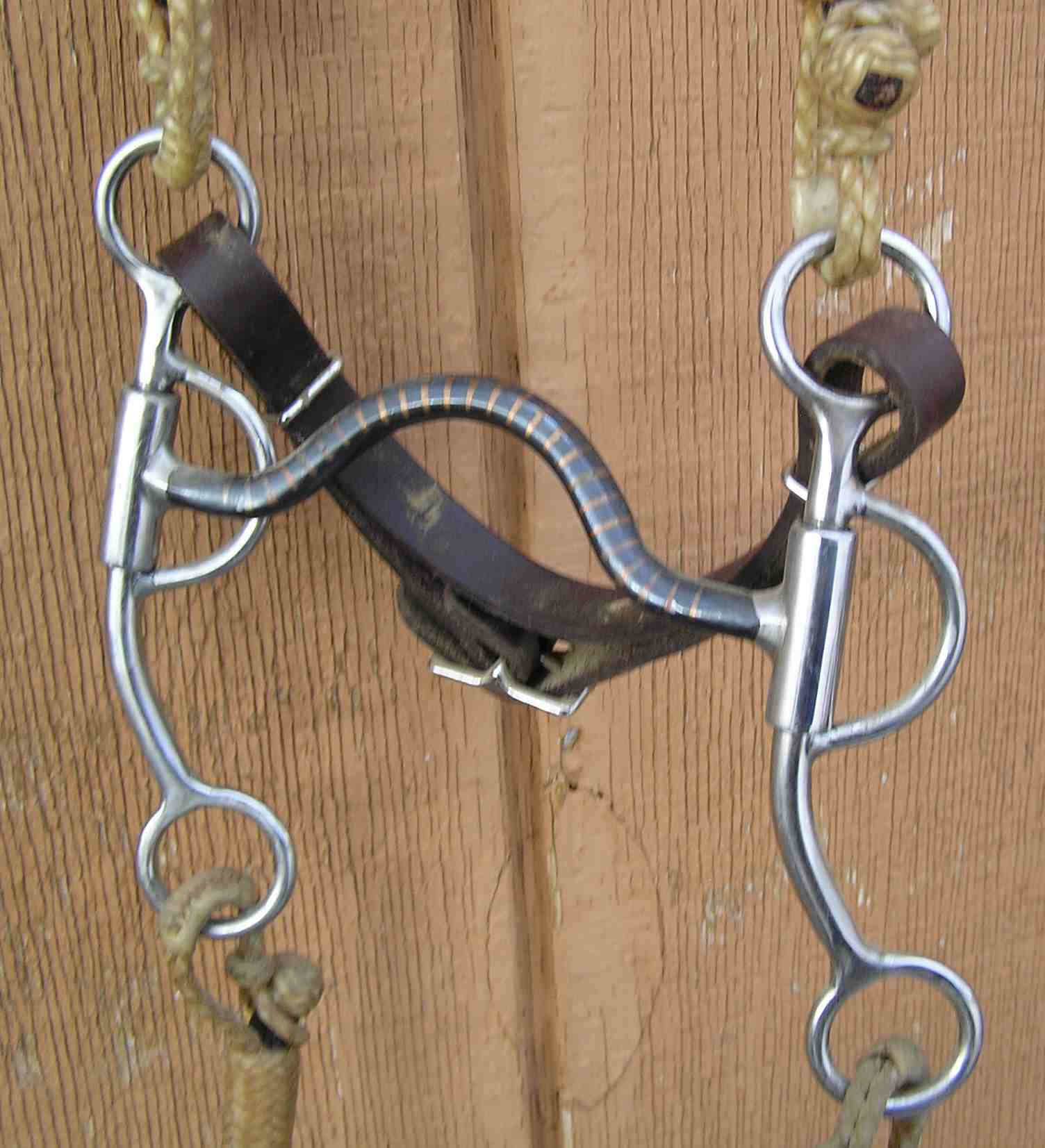
A sweet iron mouthpiece with copper inlay, designed to encourage salivation and a soft mouth

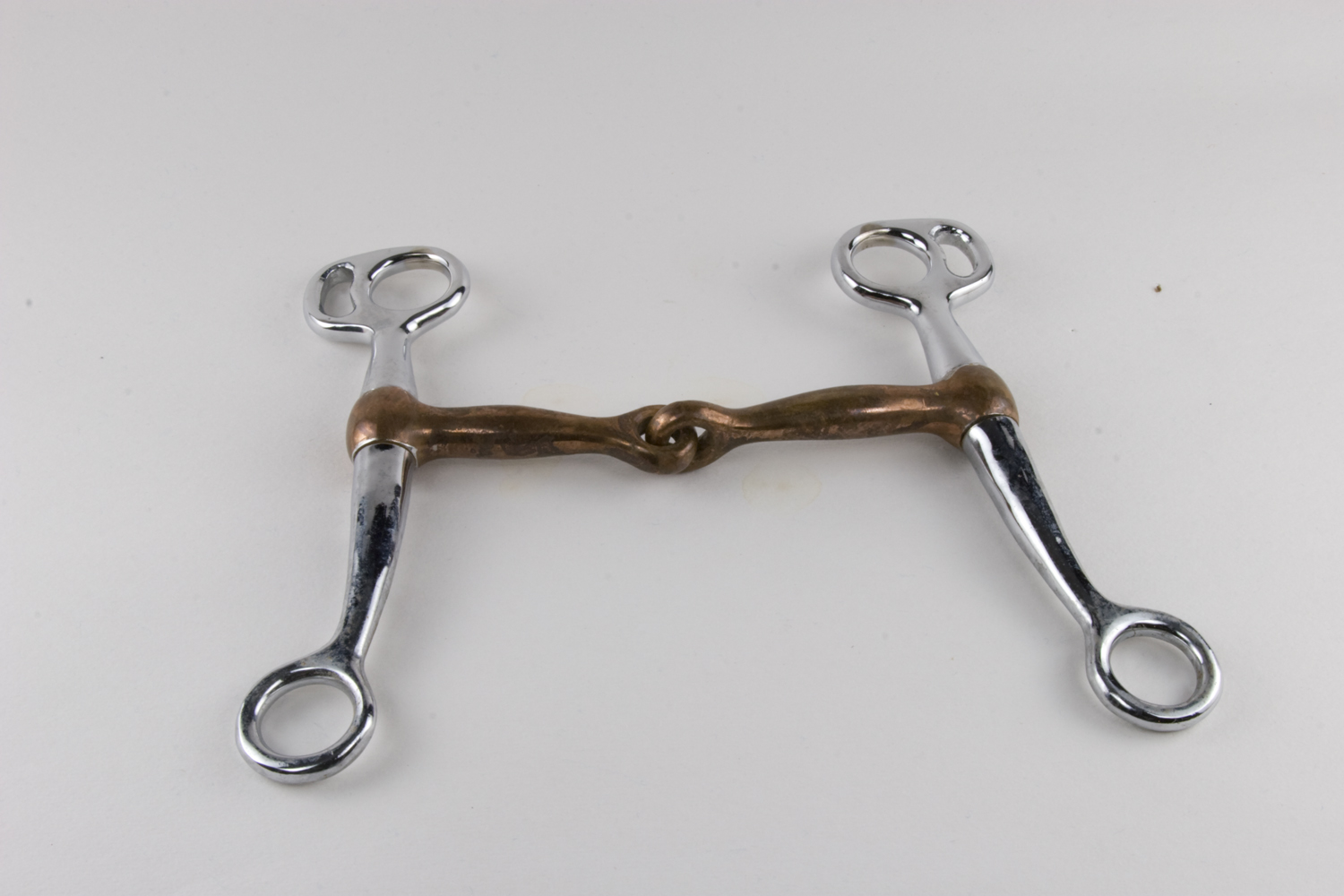
A copper mouthpiece.

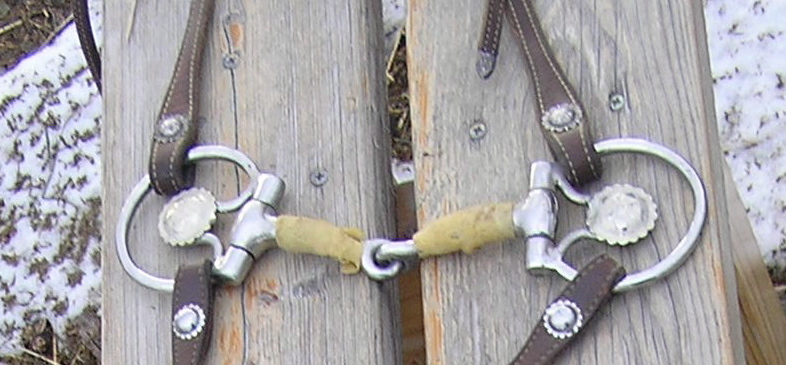
A metal bit covered with a latex rubber material

- Stainless steel: The most popular material for bits. It is strong, easy to clean, and doesn't rust. It is considered to be a neutral metal that does not encourage or discourage salivation. However, the chrome and nickel used in most stainless steel may be drying.
- Copper: Warms up quickly, but does not last as long as stainless steel. It is supposed to encourage the horse to salivate and accept the bit. There are some people who refuse to use copper bits because they believe them to be distasteful, and that to be the reason why some horses chew them so readily. Because these bits wear out fairly quickly, they should be checked regularly to make sure they are maintaining their integrity.
- Copper alloy: by combining copper with a harder metal, the bit lasts longer. In horse equipment, the most common copper alloys are:
  - Brass alloy: The most common copper alloy used in bits is brass, created by combining copper with zinc. Two common brass alloys used in bits are Aurigan, a patented alloy of copper, zinc and silicon. Another, less expensive version, is an alloy of copper, zinc, and silicon with nickel or aluminum.
  - Nickel silver or German silver: An alloy of copper with nickel and sometimes zinc. More common on a bit shank or as a substitute for silver in decorative elements on a saddle or bridle.
- Sweet iron: actually cold-rolled carbon steel: easily rusts, which encourages salivation from the horse and acceptance of the bit. This metal is used in many Western riding disciplines, and is not as popular in English riding.
- Nickel alloy: Actually an Alloy steel, is less expensive than stainless steel, but durable. May be drying, but less so than aluminum.
- Aluminum: Considered a poor choice for a mouthpiece as it tends to dry out the mouth and may be toxic. Occasionally seen in cheap western-style bits and is generally avoided. However, can be durable if made correctly, and is inexpensive.
- Rubber: softens the action of the bit. All rubber bits are very gentle, but are easily chewed and destroyed. Bits that add rubber to an underlying metal mouthpiece last longer, but the rubber must be periodically replaced. A waterproof self-sticking latex bandaging product called Sealtex is often used to add rubber to a metal bit.
- Synthetics: Any number of tough plastics are used for bit designs, combining the softness of rubber with more durability. The best are not easily destroyed by chewing.

== See also ==
- Bridle
- Bit (horse)
- Bit ring
- Bit shank

== References and external links ==
- The Bit Gallery
