= Sweet iron =

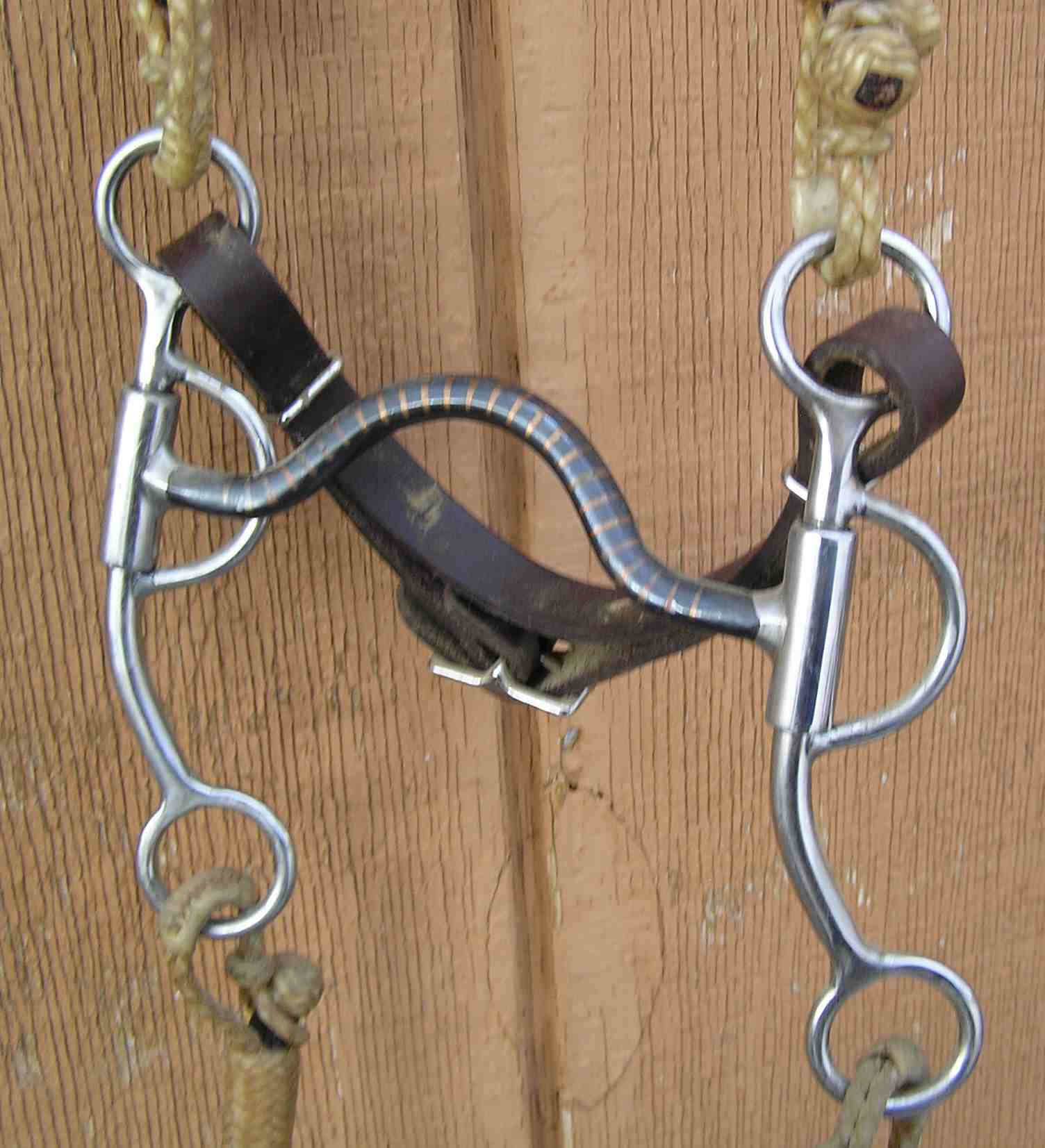
A bit with a sweet iron mouthpiece with added copper inlays

Sweet iron is a term for cold-rolled "mild steel" or carbon steel that has been work hardened, popular for use in bit mouthpieces used on horses in the western riding disciplines. It easily rusts, which supposedly encourages salivation from the horse and acceptance of the bit. In the United States this metal is used in many Western riding disciplines, and is not as popular in English riding. In Europe it is frequently used across disciplines, not just Western.
