= Aurigan =

Aurigan is a copper alloy made of 85% copper, 4% silicon, and 11% zinc. It is patented, and is used on high quality bits for horses to encourage increased salivation, which leads to a softer and more responsive mouth on the horse. Aurigan is similar in appearance to other copper alloys, but has different oxidation properties due to its composition. One advantage it has over other copper alloys such as German silver is that it is nickel-free; some horses have been known to have a nickel allergy which appears as pimples in the mouth.
