= List of horse breeds of the British Isles =

This is a list of some of the breeds of horse originating in the British Isles. Breeds marked with a "†" symbol are considered rare.

== Horses ==
- Cleveland Bay †
- Clydesdale †
- Gypsy Cob
- Hackney †
- Irish Draught
- Irish Sport Horse
- Shire †
- Suffolk Punch †
- Thoroughbred
- Welsh Cob

== Ponies ==
- British Spotted Pony
- Connemara
- Dales pony †
- Dartmoor pony †
- Eriskay pony †
- Exmoor pony †
- Fell pony †
- Hackney pony
- Highland pony †
- Kerry Bog pony
- Lundy pony
- New Forest pony †
- Shetland pony
- Welara
- Welsh pony

== Types ==
- Cob
- Garron
- Hack
- Hunter
- Polo pony
- Riding pony
- Windsor Grey

== Extinct ==
- Galloway pony
- Irish Hobby
- Norfolk Trotter
- Old English Black
- Yorkshire Coach Horse
- Yorkshire Grey Horse
