= Mountain and moorland pony breeds =

Horse breed

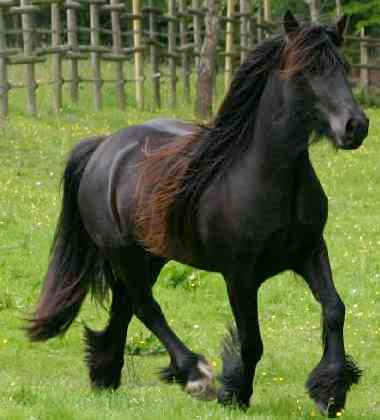
The Fell pony is one of the Mountain & Moorland pony breeds.

Mountain and moorland, frequently abbreviated M&M, is a classification of nine pony breeds native to the British Isles that originated on the moorlands, heaths, highlands and uplands. These breeds are domesticated for riding, driving, and other draught work, though some breeders keep semi-feral herds for conservation purposes. Mountain and moorland classes are common at horse shows in the British Isles.

== Breeds ==
The mountain and moorland breeds are traditionally counted as nine, with the four Welsh sections counted as one. However, when the breeds are separated into large and small classifications, the Welsh sections are counted two for small and two for large. Though there are other native breeds of pony in the British Isles, only these nine breeds are classified as mountain and moorland breeds.

=== Small breeds ===
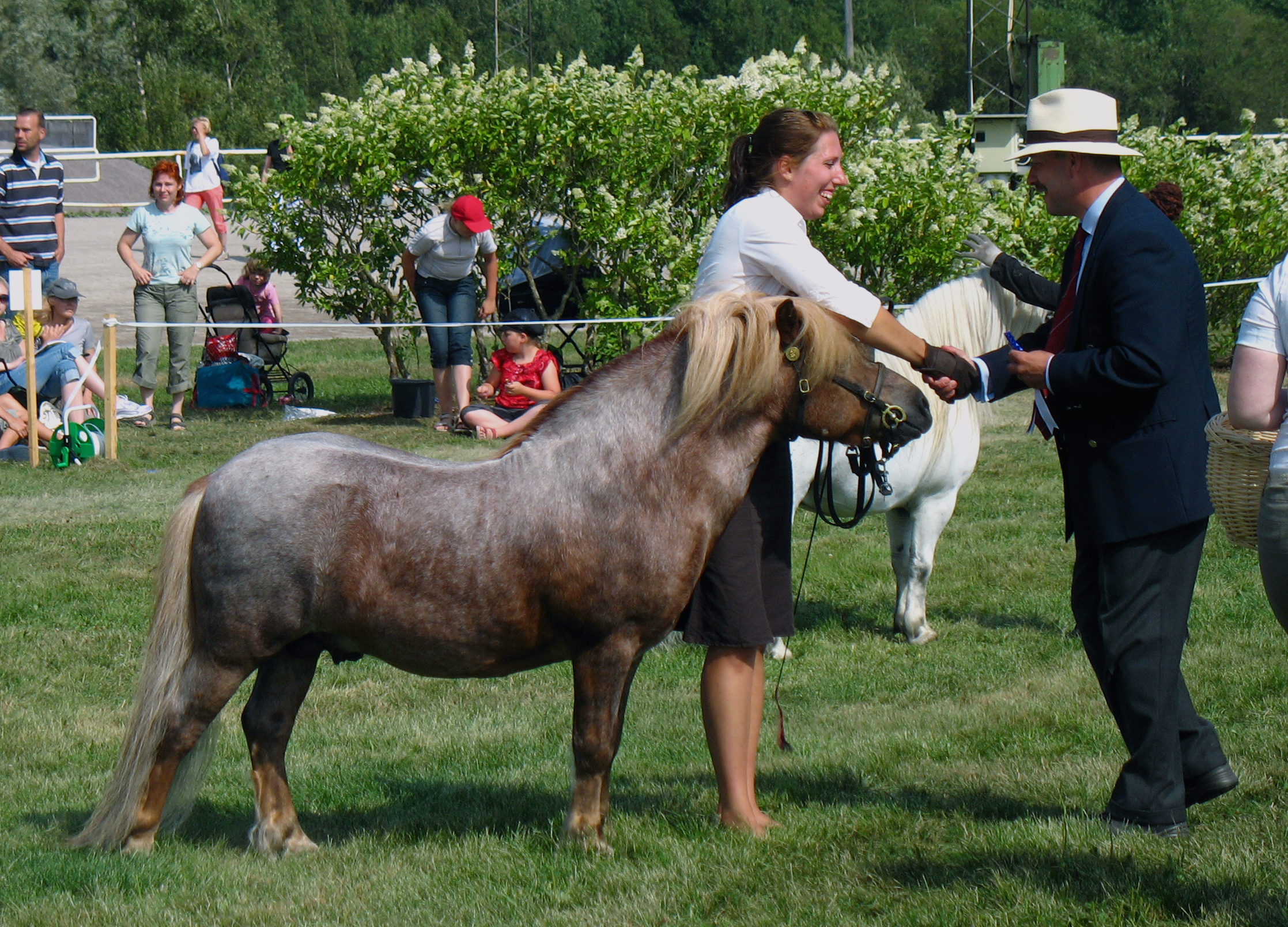
The Shetland pony is one of the smallest Mountain & Moorland breeds.

- Shetland pony from the Shetland Isles off the northern tip of Scotland
- Exmoor pony from Exmoor in south-west England
- Dartmoor pony from Dartmoor in south-west England
- Welsh pony sections A and B from Wales

=== Large breeds ===
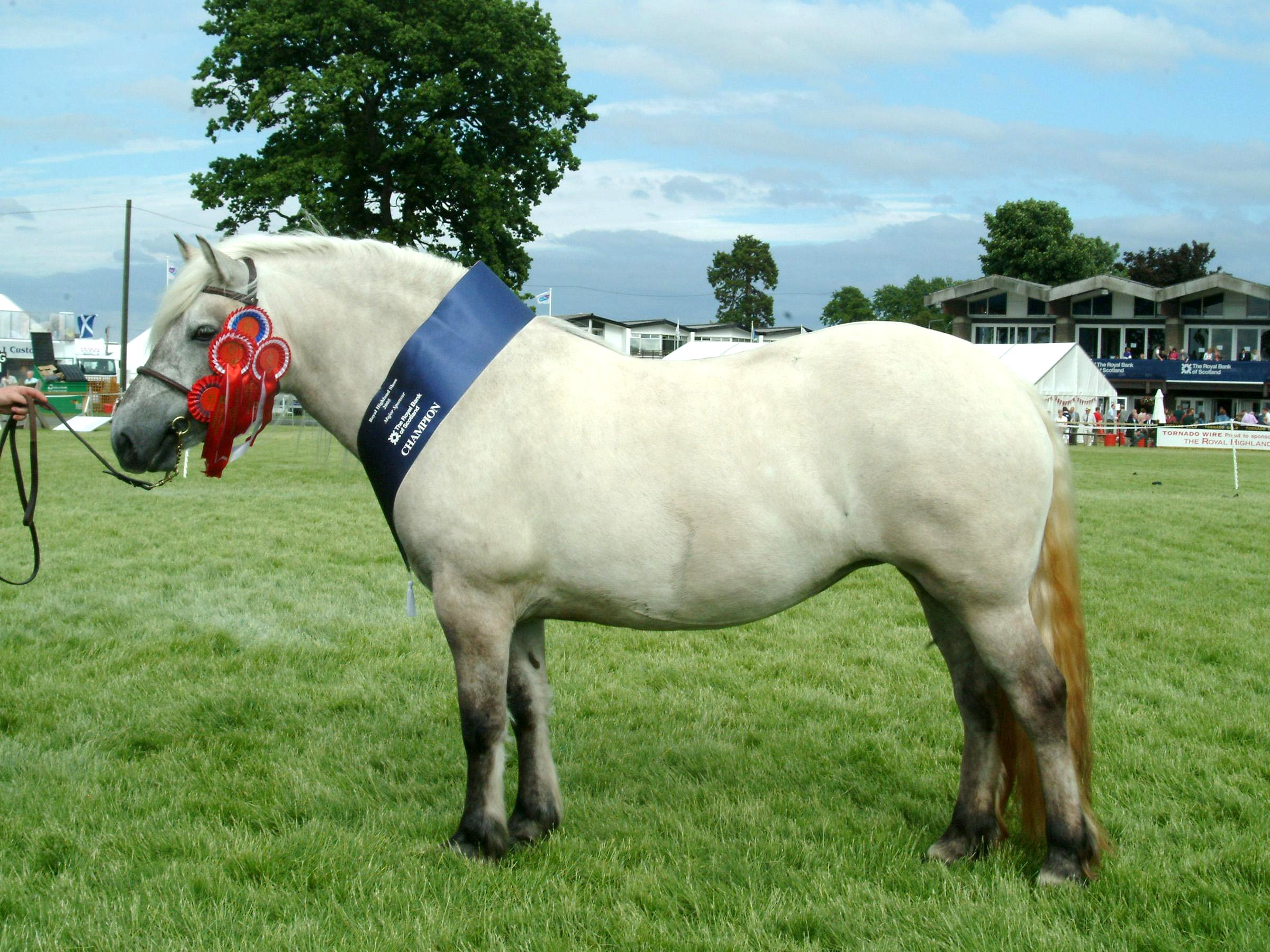
The Highland pony is one of the largest Mountain & Moorland breeds.

- Connemara pony from western Ireland
- Highland pony from Scotland
- Dales pony from northern England
- Fell pony from north-western England
- New Forest pony from the New Forest on the south coast of England
- Welsh pony sections C and D from Wales

== Characteristics ==
Mountain and moorland ponies are generally stocky in build, with ample manes and tails. According to a National Pony Society judge, "The body shape I prefer in natives is that of a deep bodied pony that would be tough and hardy. [...] The depth of body should match the length of leg. This general body type is better adapted for living in the fairly hostile environments from where most of our native breeds evolved. Many tend to be broad at the withers, which shows their multi purpose heritage. Large breeds should have plenty of hard flinty bone, well-formed round feet and be capable of carrying considerable weight."

Since their original habitats were rugged with sparse fodder, they are very hardy and are "good doers", needing relatively little feed to live on. As such, they can be prone to obesity if allowed access to lush pastures.

== Showing ==
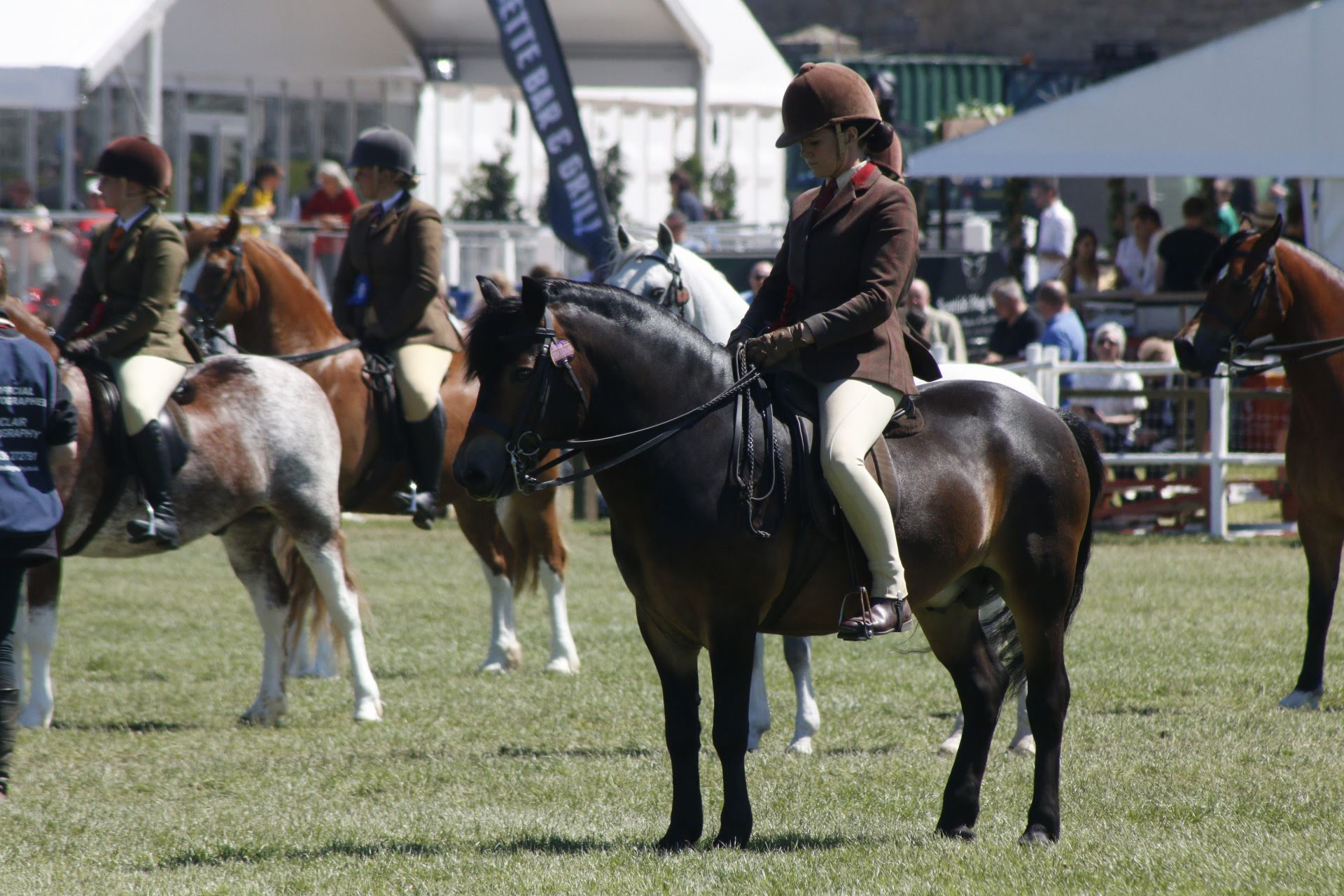
Image shows rider outfits and tack in a 2018 Mountain and Moorland pony championship

In horse shows, mountain and moorland classes are usually divided into small breeds and large breeds. Judges must know the standards for each of the M&M breeds because ponies are judged against their respective breed standard. Show classes usually require that ponies are registered with their respective breed societies, though some shows allow non-registered ponies that match the M&M types. The show societies which hold M&M classes that contribute toward national and championship competitions include the National Pony Society, British Show Pony Society, and UK Ponies & Horses. According to Belknap, the "National Pony Society was founded in 1893 to encourage the breeding, registration and improvement of British riding ponies and Mountain and Moorland ponies and to foster the welfare of ponies in general".

In Mountain & Moorland show classes, ponies are shown with natural full tails (not pulled or plaited), untrimmed feather on the legs, and their manes are either left natural, plaited or hogged. Riders typically wear tweed jackets and brown Jodhpur boots, and bridles and saddles should be plain leather.

== Conservation ==
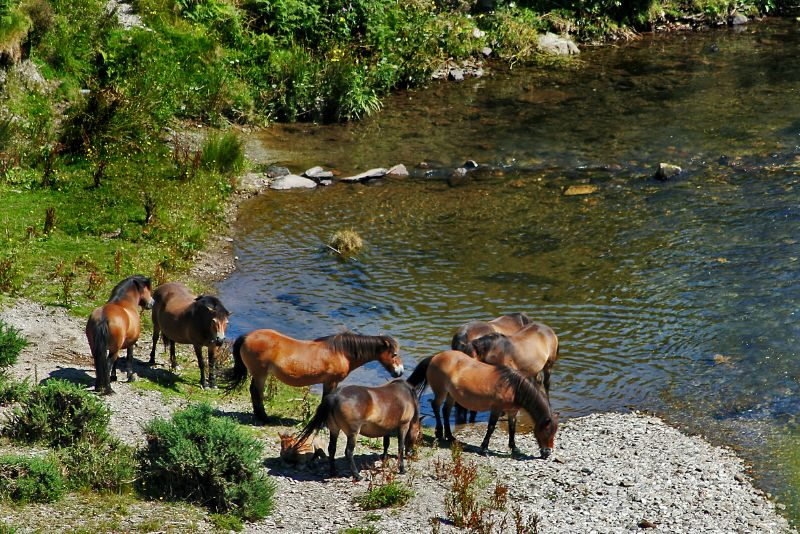
Exmoor ponies

Some of the breeds have had conservation advocates for many years. For example, moorland breeders keep some wild herds of the Exmoor pony for future generations to be able to breed to foundation stock.

== See also ==
- List of horse breeds of the British Isles
- List of horse breeds
