= Dartmoor pony =

Horse breed

Dartmoor Pony
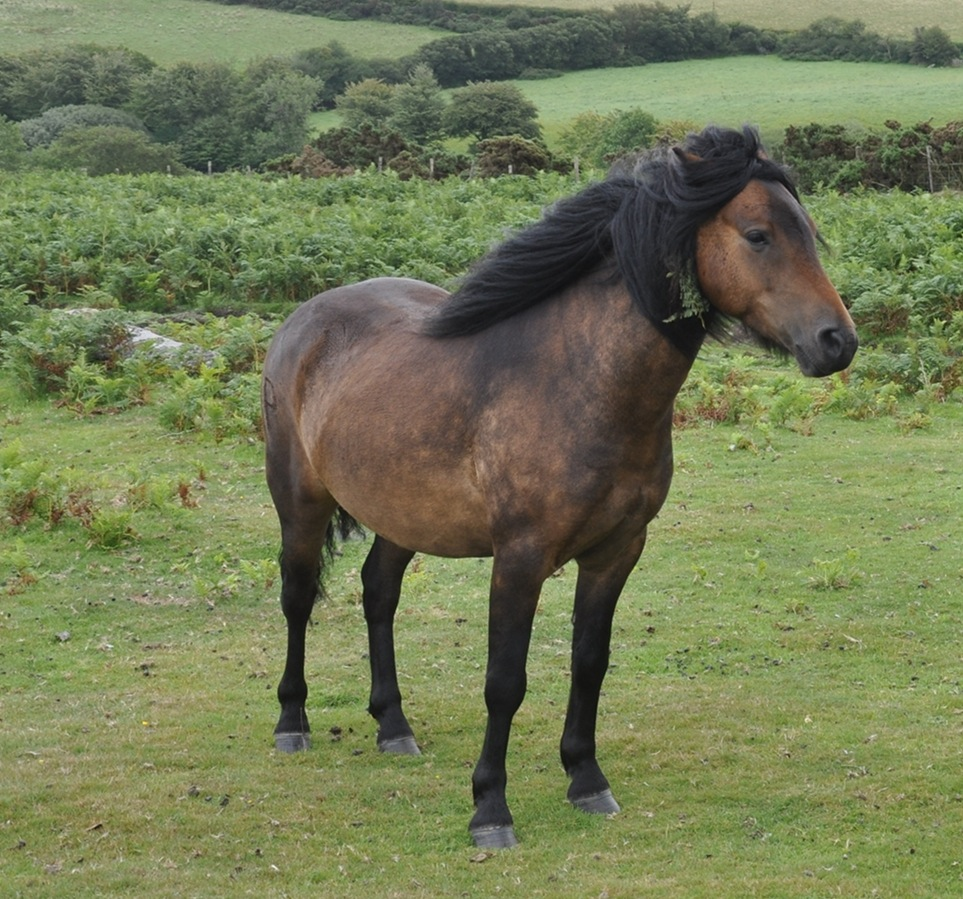

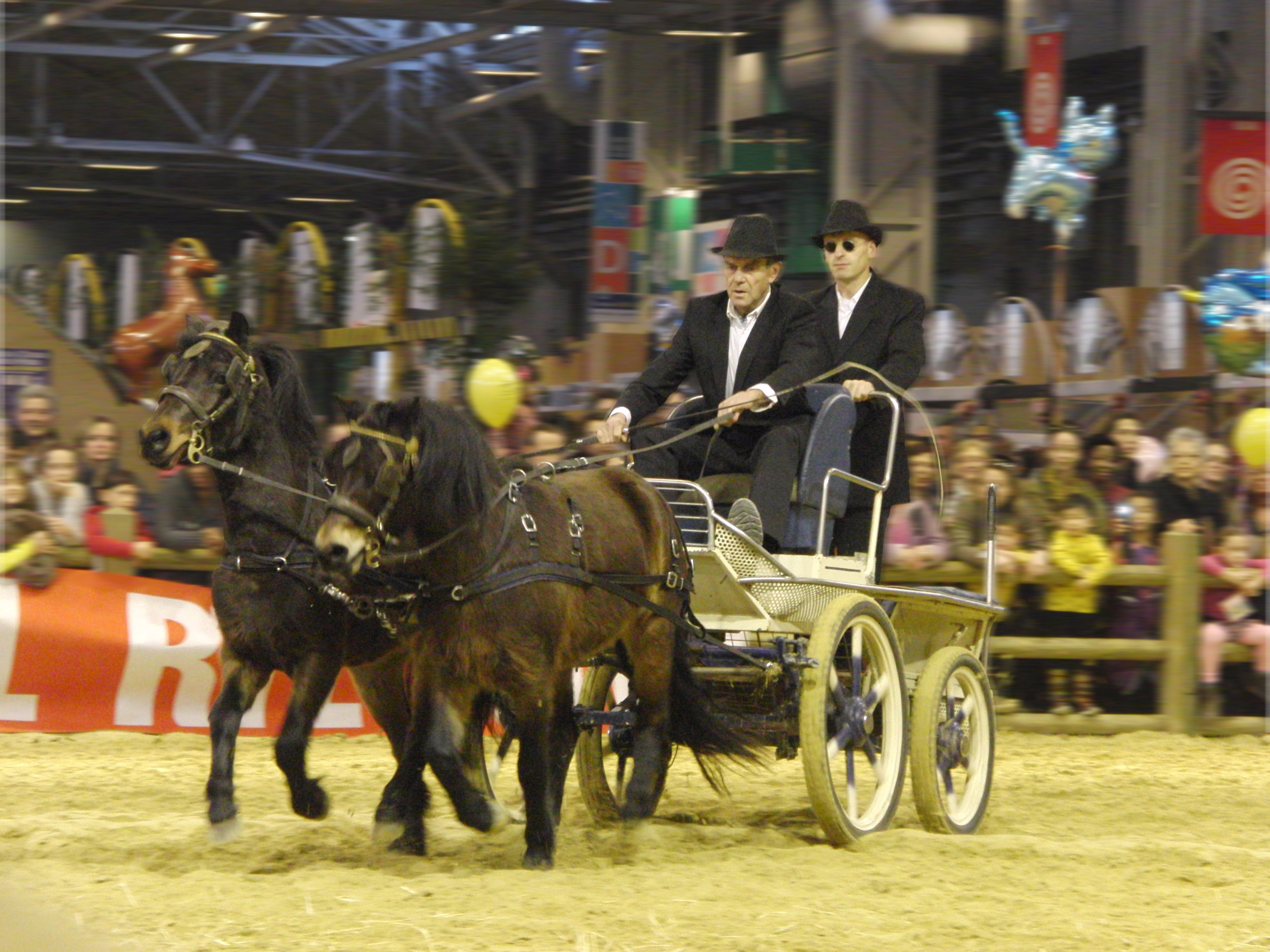
- Country of origin: England

Traits
- Distinguishing features: Small but strong, many colours, hardy

The Dartmoor pony is a breed of pony that lives in Devon, England. The breed has been in England for centuries and is used in a variety of roles. Because of the extreme weather conditions experienced on the moors, the Dartmoor pony is a particularly hardy breed with excellent stamina. Over the centuries, it has been used as a working animal by local tin miners and quarry workers. It is kept in a semiferal state on Dartmoor.

Despite this, numbers living on the open moor have declined from an estimated 5,000 in 1900 to about 300 registered ponies today. Only around 800 ponies were known to be grazing the moor in the spring of 2004.

== Breed characteristics ==
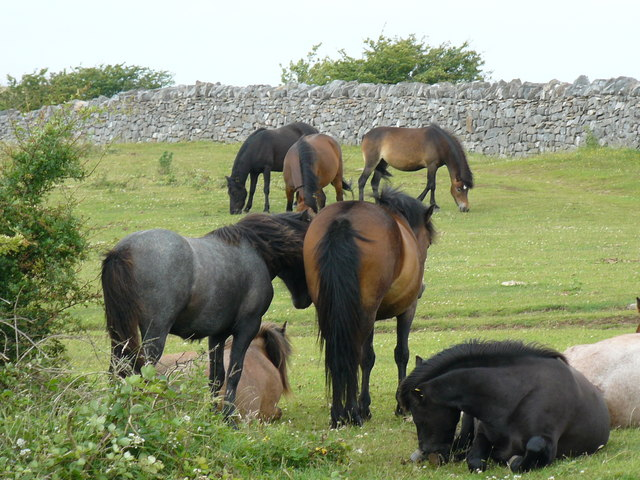
Dartmoor ponies

The Dartmoor has a small, neat head, large, wide-set eyes, and alert ears. It has a well-compact body that is strong, with a broad, deep rib cage, of medium length. The legs are strong, long from body to knee and hock, but with short cannons with strong, dense bone, and a flat-fronted knee; the fore leg rises to a shoulder that is well-angled and with good freedom of movement, and the hind leg rises to a quarter that is well-muscled and rounded in appearance, rather than flat or sloping. The mane and tail are full and flowing, and the pony's movement is free and smooth. It has a kind temperament, being reliable, gentle, and calm. Most Dartmoors stand between 11.1 and 12.2 hands (45 and 50 inches, 114 and 127 cm); a pony should stand at no more than 13 hands under the breed standard, introduced in 1924. Recognised colours include bay, brown, black, grey, chestnut, or roan.

Piebald and skewbald colouring are not permitted within the Dartmoor pony breed. Ponies with this colouring, seen running on Dartmoor, are likely to be Dartmoor Hill Ponies, as Dartmoor commoners may graze any type of pony out on the moors. The Dartmoor Hill Pony is classified as a pony born on Dartmoor, but not a purebred registered Dartmoor pony. It is not a true breed as such, as the registry for Dartmoor Hill Ponies is open only to those born on the moors, so a pony born of two Dartmoor Hill ponies, but not born on the moors, could not be registered with the Dartmoor Hill Pony Association.

Although Exmoor ponies live fairly close geographically and their markings are somewhat similar, evidence now suggests that Dartmoor and Exmoor ponies are not as related as was once thought.

== Breed history ==
The bones of prehistoric horses have been found in chamber tombs dating from Vere Gordon Childe's period III – IV in southern Britain. This would date the bones at the transition from a hunter-gatherer society to an agricultural society (the Neolithic Revolution) around 3500 BC; the bones are probably from wild horses, but domestication may have begun by that date. Archeological investigation from the 1970s has shown that domesticated ponies were to be found on Dartmoor as early as 1500 BC. The first written record, dated to AD 1012, refers to wild horses at Ashburton, and early records from Dartmoor manors refer to ponies being branded and earmarked.

The Dartmoor pony was used in medieval times for carrying heavy loads of tin ore from the mines across the moor. When the mines closed, some ponies were kept for farming, but most were turned out onto the moor. Ponies were bred at Dartmoor Prison from the early 1900s until the 1960s, and used by guards for escorting prisoners.

The Dartmoor received Arab blood from the stallion Dwarka, foaled in 1922, as well as Dwarka's son, The Leat. Welsh Pony breeding was introduced from the stallion Dinarth Spark, and infusions of Fell Pony blood were also added.

The first attempt to define and register the breed was in 1898, when the ponies were entered into a studbook started by the Polo Pony Society. In 1924, the breed society was founded, and a studbook opened. World War I and World War II were devastating to the breed. Only a few ponies were registered during World War II. However, after the war, local people began to inspect and register as many ponies as they could, and by the 1950s, numbers were back up.

Two schemes have been introduced to halt the decline in numbers, and broaden the gene pool of the Dartmoor pony. The Dartmoor Pony Moorland Scheme was established in 1988 and is administered by the Dartmoor Pony Society and the Duchy of Cornwall, as well as being supported by the Dartmoor National Park. In 2004, a new scheme, the Dartmoor Pony Preservation Scheme, was introduced, and herds taking part in this new scheme must enter one mare each year to the DPMS. The Dartmoor pony has been granted Rare Breed status.

== Dartmoor ponies today ==
Dartmoor ponies are native to Britain, but are also seen in other parts of the world, including the US, Continental Europe, New Zealand, and Australia. They are often used as foundation breeding stock for the Riding Pony. The breed is a good size and temperament for a children's mount, but it can carry an adult. They are mainly used for hunting, trail riding, showing, jumping, dressage, and driving, as well as everyday riding.

All ponies that are free-roaming on Dartmoor are owned and protected by Dartmoor Commoners. A byelaw forbids people from feeding the ponies.

== See also ==
- Mountain and moorland pony breeds

== Sources ==
- Dent, Anthony Austen; Hendricks, Bonnie L. (2007), International Encyclopedia of Horse Breeds, Norman: University of Oklahoma Press, ISBN 978-0-8061-3884-8
- Lynghaug, Fran (2009), The Official Horse Breeds Standards Guide: The Complete Guide to the Standards of All North American Equine Breed Associations, Stillwater, MN: Voyageur Press, ISBN 978-0-7603-3499-7
- Rayner, Judy (1974), The horseman's companion: a guide to riding and horses, London: Croom Helm, p. 181, ISBN 0-85664-200-2
- Daniel, Glynn (1950), The Prehistoric Chamber Tombs of England and Wales, Cambridge University Press, ASIN B0000CHRBZ
