= Irish Sport Horse =

Irish breed of horse

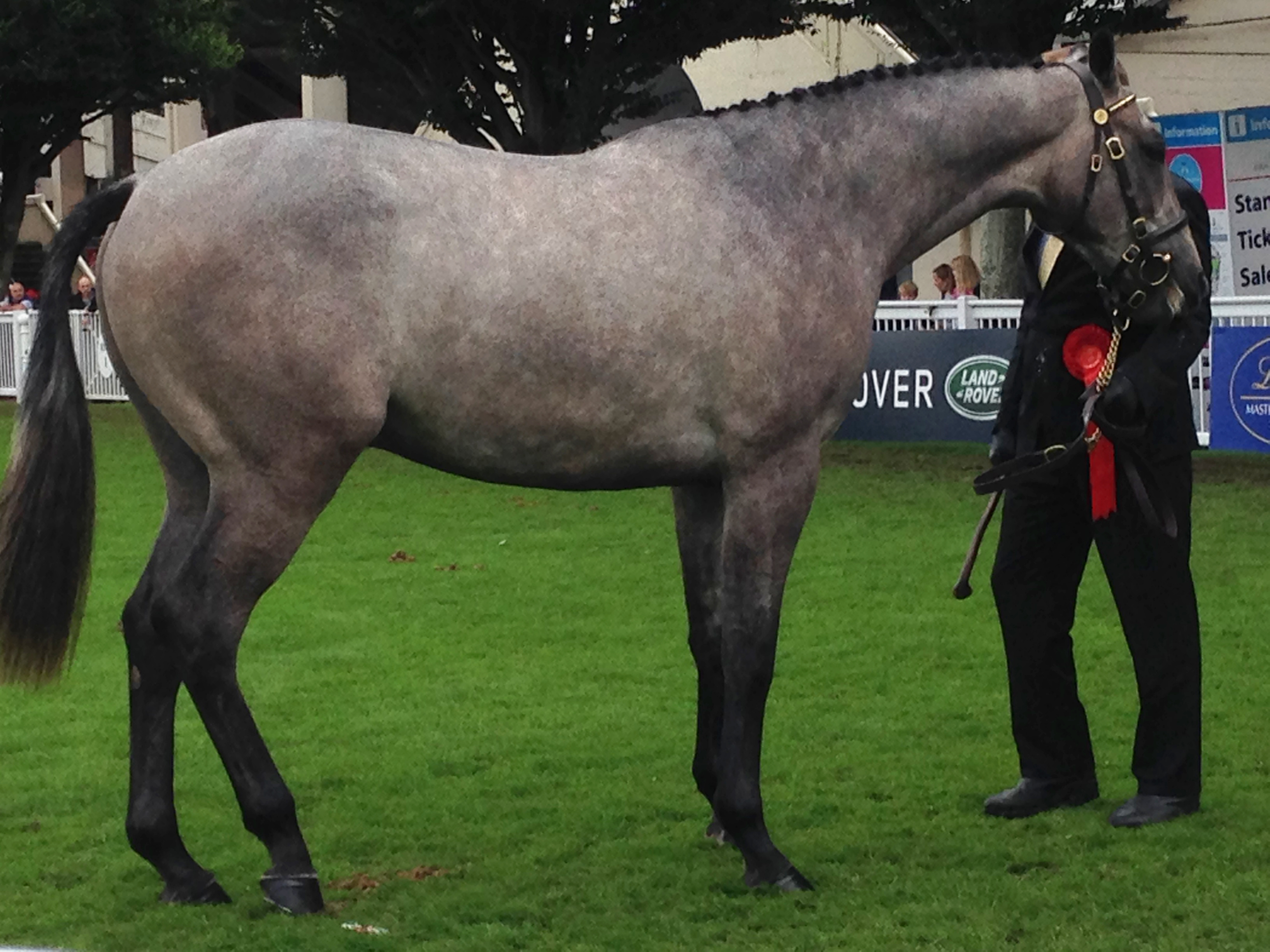

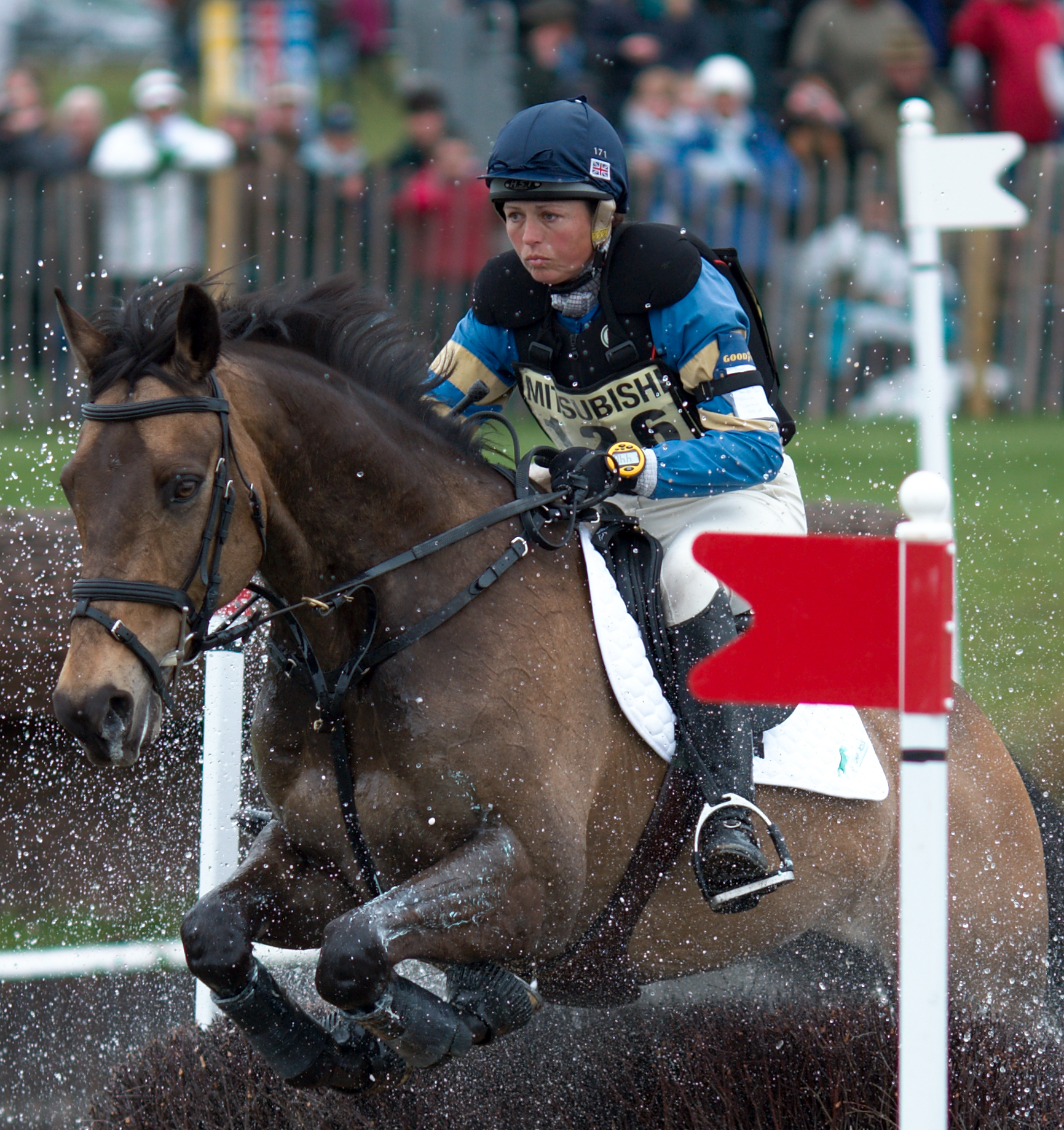
- Conservation status: FAO (2007):not at risk
- Other names: Irish Hunter; Irish Draught Sport Horse (USA & CAN)
- Country of origin: Ireland
- Use: eventing; show-jumping; dressage

Traits
- Height: 162 to 173 cm (16.0 to 17.0 h)
- Colour: any

Breed standards
- Irish Sport Horse Studbook

The Irish Sport Horse (ISH), or Irish Hunter, is an Irish horse breed used mostly for eventing and show-jumping. Historically the ISH was bred by crossing Irish Draught and Thoroughbred stock, and the breed was formalised in the 1920s.

== Breed characteristics ==
The Irish Sport Horse typically has the conformation and athletic ability for high-level equestrian performance. The breed is characterized with a straight and balanced gait with a notable jumping capability. It usually has a strong bone structure, a short back and strong loins, muscular hindquarters, a sloping shoulder, deep chest, and a long neck. The ISH has a good temperament which is willing, sensible, and steadfast. Horses may be of any color, and the standard describes stallions as being generally taller than 160 cm (15.3 h) and mares 150 to 161 cm (14.3 to 15.3 h).

According to the registration rules of the Irish Draught Horse Society of Canada,

The Irish Draught Sport Horse is a versatile, powerful and athletic animal with substance and quality. It has a pleasant head, good bone and a short shin, good spring of rib, strong loins and hindquarters and an active powerful stride. Known for its good temperament, docility and willing nature, it has a robust constitution and is inherently sound.

== Breed history ==
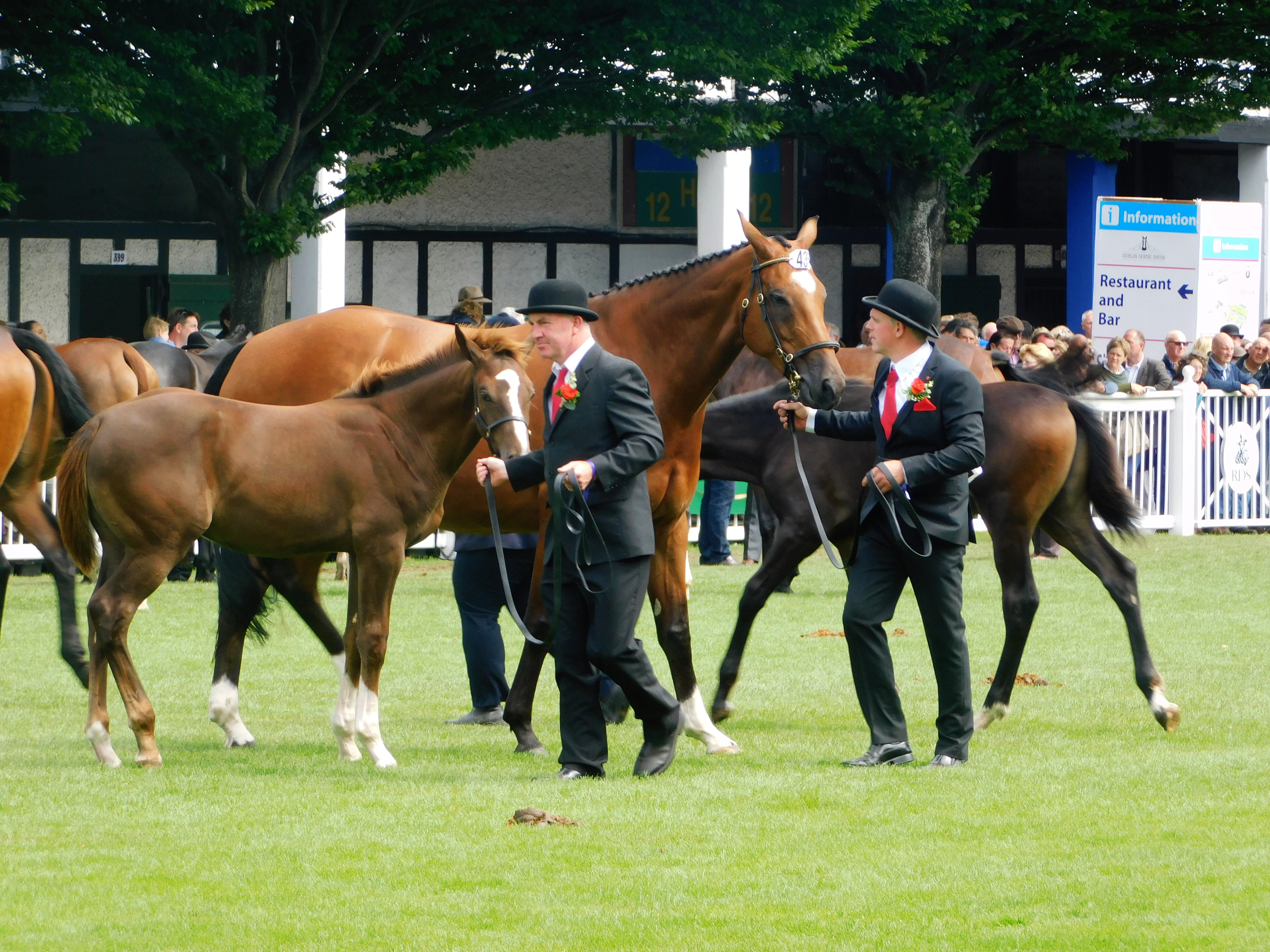
ISH mare and foal class at Dublin Horse Show 2017

The main two components of the Irish Sport Horse are the Irish Draught (RID) (Note: "RID" is used universally as initials meaning "Registered Irish Draught".) and Thoroughbred breeds. Historically, Irish hunters were classified by weight typically based on the percentage of Thoroughbred blood—heavyweight hunters were either 100% Irish Draught or 1/4 Thoroughbred cross, mediumweight were half Thoroughbred, and lightweight were 3/4 Thoroughbred.

The Irish Sport Horse received a small (5%) infusion of warmblood blood in the 1990s from crosses with Hanoverian, Selle Français and Trakehner horses. In recent years, European warmbloods have been used to cross with RID to make Irish Sport Horses because the warmbloods mature faster than Thoroughbreds. According to Emily Donoho, "while [adding warmbloods] increases genetic diversity and gets more Irish horses in the showjumping ring, some competitors and breeders are concerned that the traditional TB-ID lines are being lost". A report from a study of Irish Draught genetics recognized the importance of ID genes in producing high quality contemporary sport horses, however it pointed out the difficulties because of the small population size of the endangered Irish Draught, and the problems of dilution on second and third generations without additional infusion of ID blood.

Horse Sport Ireland (HSI) maintains the Irish Sport Horse Studbook by authority of the Department of Agriculture, Food and the Marine. HSI also maintains a category for Traditional Irish Horse (TIH) which is a designation for horses with only Irish Sport Horse, Irish Draught, Thoroughbred, and Connemara Pony in their pedigrees.

The Australian society, established in 1989, requires an Irish Sport Horse to have at least 25% Irish Draught and no other breeds except Thoroughbred, they require an inspection to enter the studbook, and use the standards of the Irish studbook. The North American society, established in 1993, requires 1/4 RID (verified through DNA) and an inspection. They do have an uninspected classification which allows as little as 1/8 RID.

== Uses ==
The Irish Sport Horse is a successful competition riding horse, used primarily in eventing where its qualities of speed, jumping strength, scope and courage are best used. It also does well in show-jumping and dressage. The Irish Sport Horse Studbook is highly placed in the annual rankings of eventing competitions by the World Breeding Federation for Sport Horses, placing first amongst the other breeds in every year from 1994 to 2018, except for two years. (Note: The ISH placed second in 2010 and third in 2011.) According to Donoho, the ISH "dominates eventing" including at such top level competitions at Badminton, Burghley, the Olympics, and world championships.

Irish Sport Horses in action

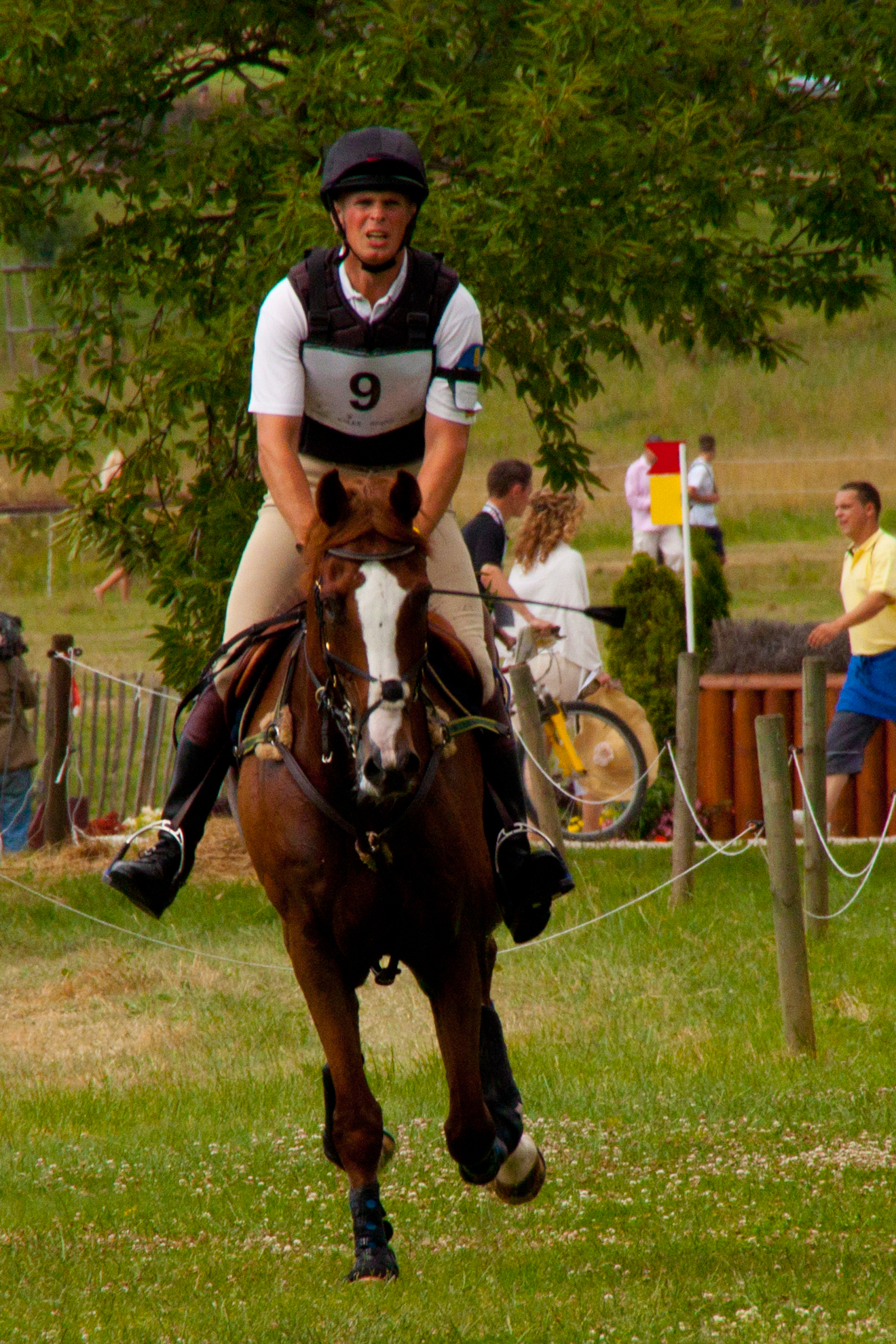
Mr Medicott (Note: Frank Ostholt on eventer Mr Medicott; they received a team gold medal, Beijing Olympics 2008)

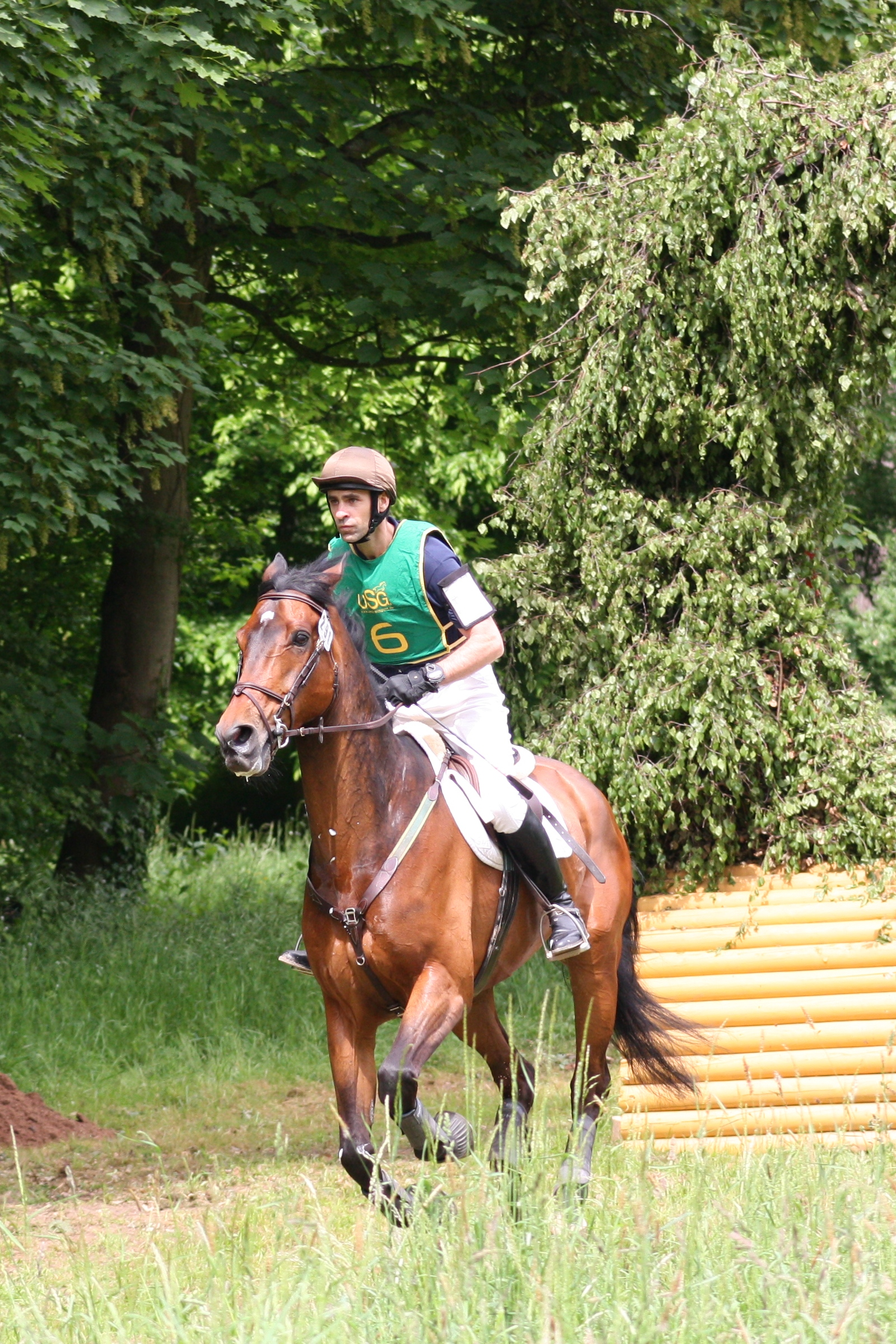
Inistioge Ohio

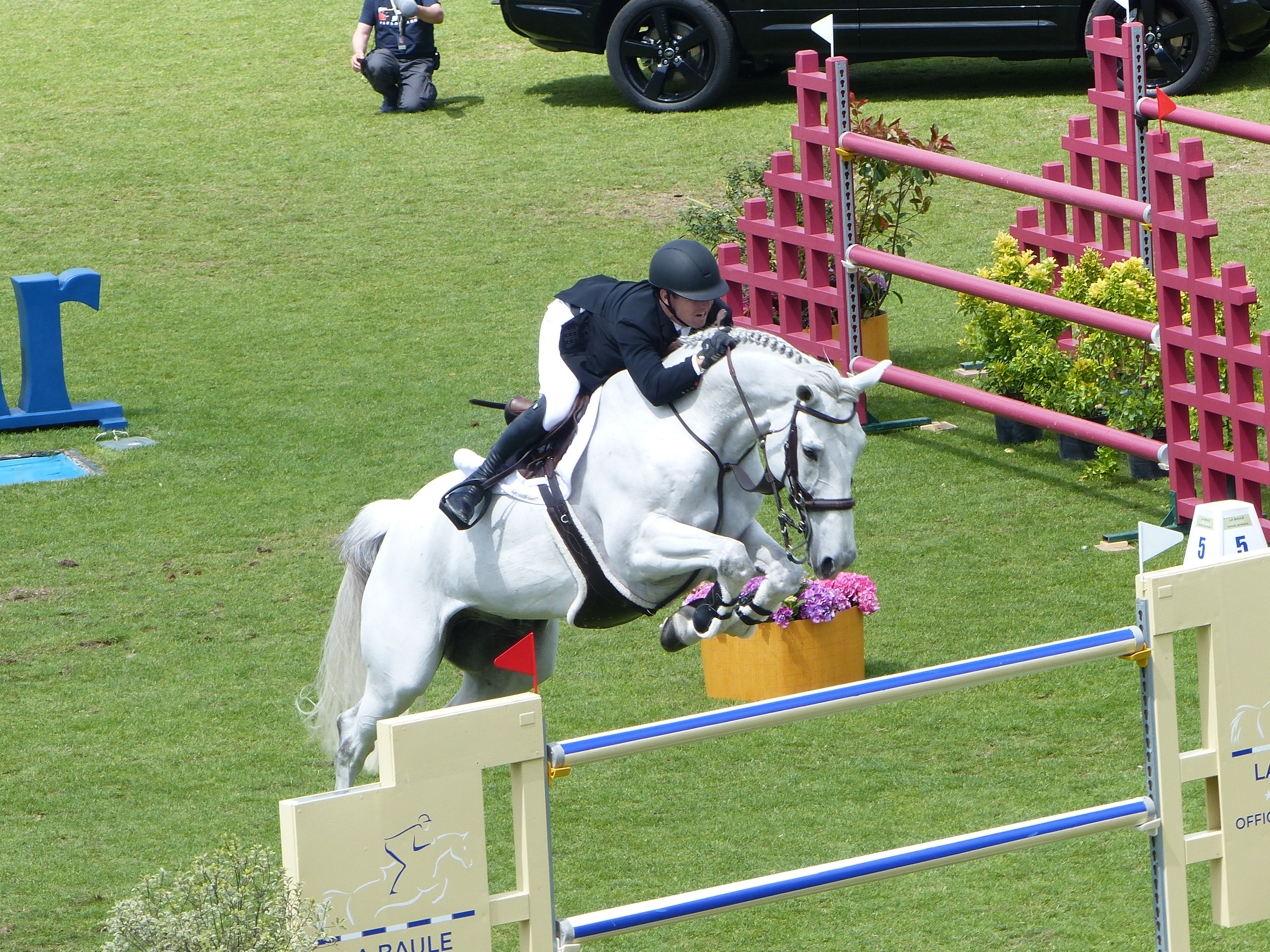
James Kann Cruz (Note: Shane Sweetnam won a silver medal, Paris Olympics 2024)

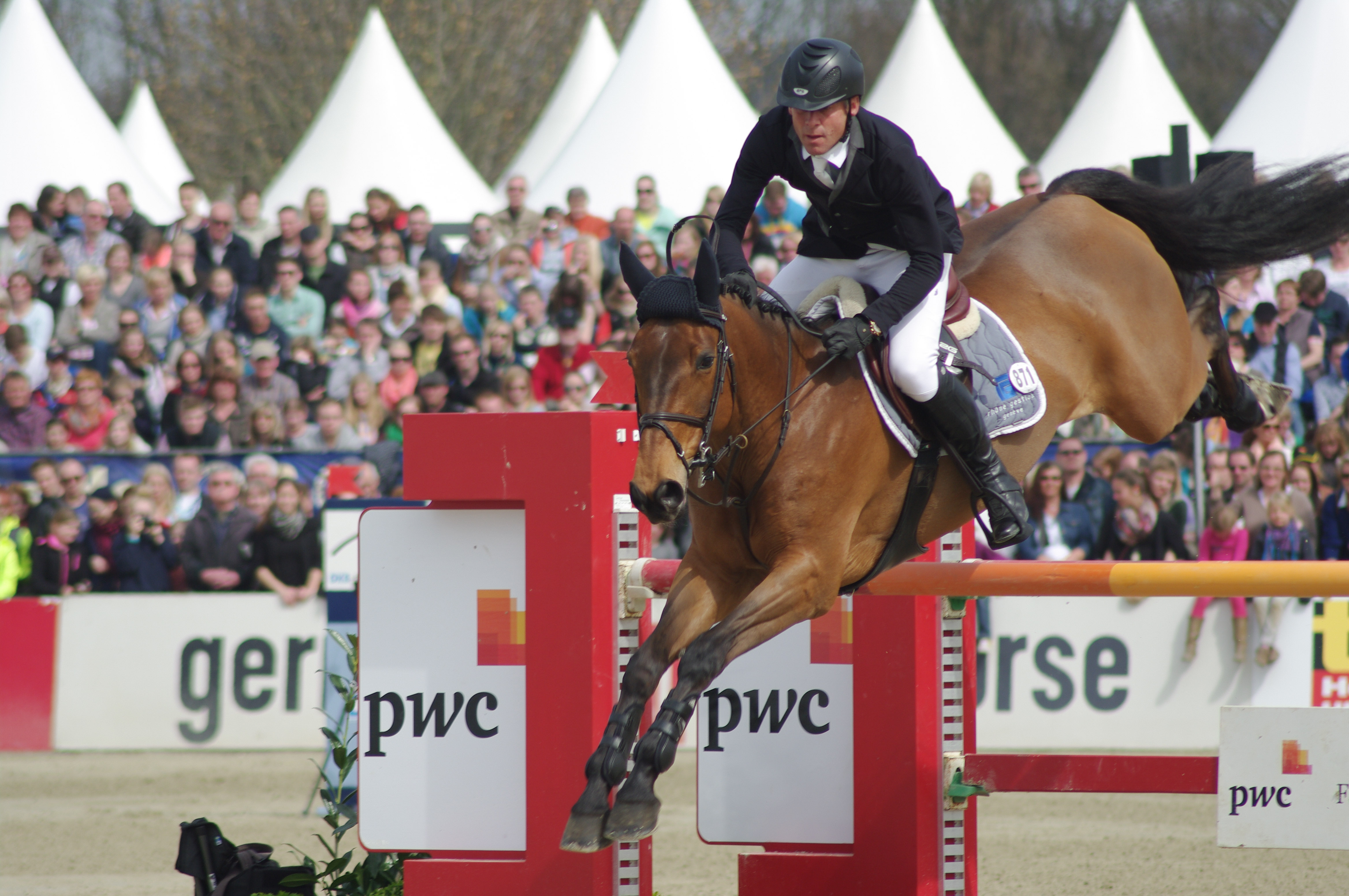
Castlefield Eclipse

== Depiction on Irish coins ==
This horse is depicted on the reverses of both the Irish half crown (1928-1943 and 1951-1967) and the Irish twenty pence coin (1986-2000) as well as on a modified design for a 2010 silver commemorative €15 coin.

== See also ==
- List of notable Irish Sport Horses
- List of horse breeds of the British Isles
