= Irish Draught =

Horse breed

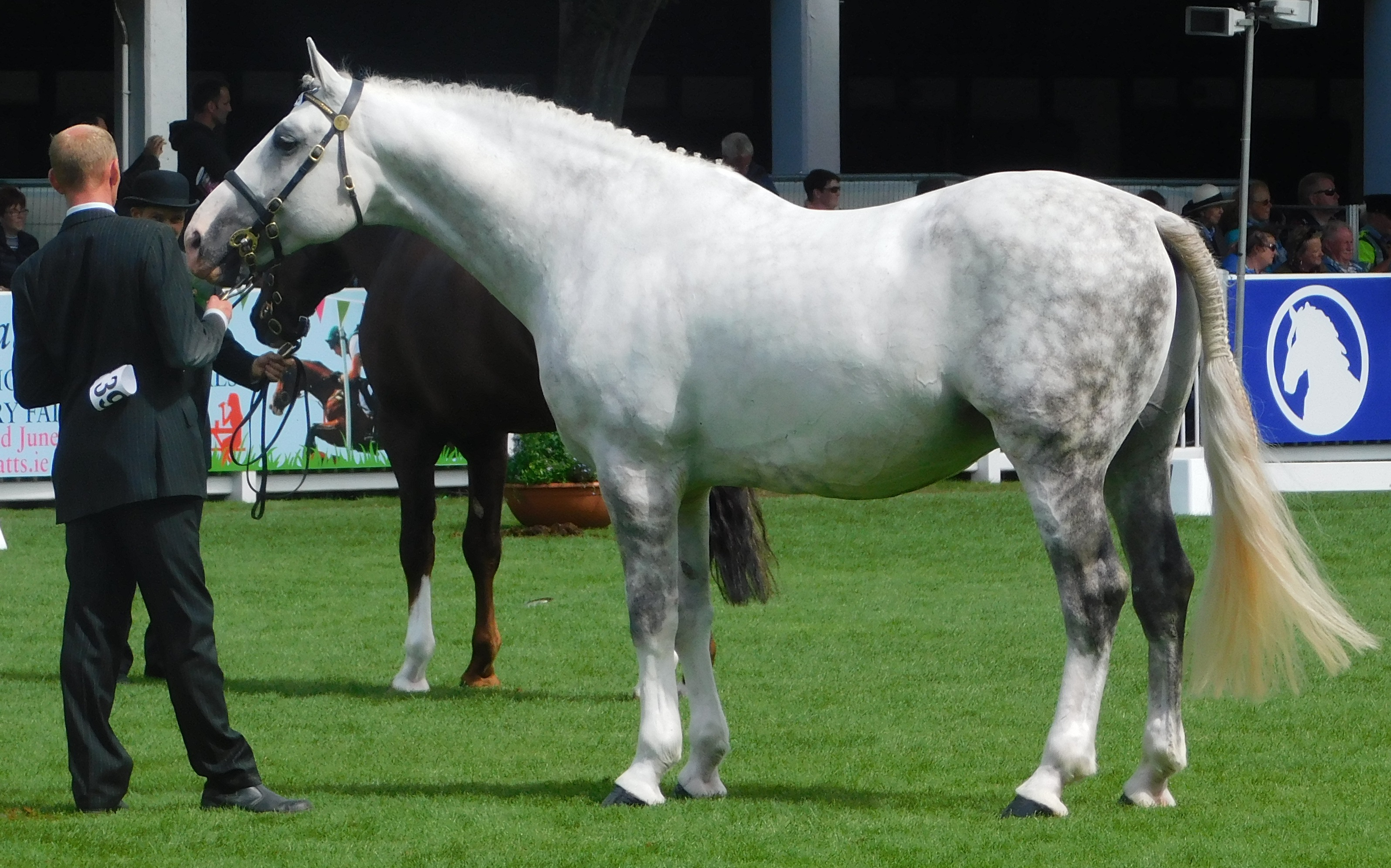
- Irish Draught stallion

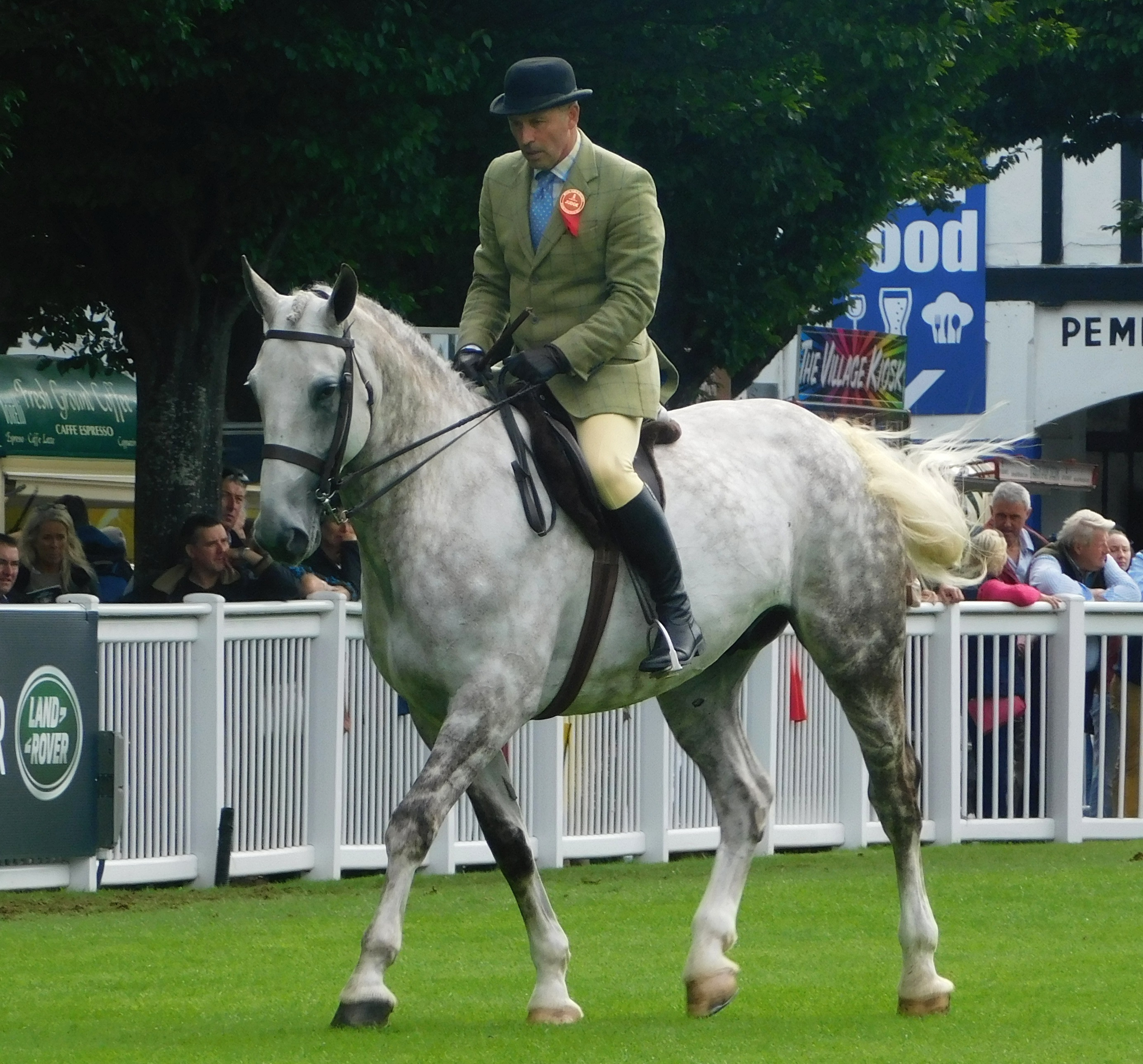
- Heavyweight hunter showing
- Country of origin: Ireland

Traits
- Height: 15.2-16.3 hands
- Distinguishing features: Powerful warmblood build, well-muscled

Breed standards
- Irish Draught Horse Breeders Association

The Irish Draught horse is the national horse breed of Ireland which developed primarily for farm use. Today, they are frequently used to crossbreed with Thoroughbreds and warmbloods to produce the Irish Sport Horse (also called Irish Draught Sport Horse) which excel at the highest levels of eventing and show jumping.

== Characteristics ==
Horses should ideally be 15.2–16.3 hands (62–67 inches, 157–170 cm), with leg bone strong, clean and flat, measuring about 9 inches (23 cm). (Note: Leg bone is measured around the leg at the top of the canon bone, directly under the knee.) The head is wide at the forehead with and a "kind" eye, the neck well-muscled and long, a sloping shoulder, and well-defined withers. The legs are muscular and straight, hooves hard and sound, not overly large, boxy, or flat. The heartgirth is deep, ribs well sprung, strong back, and hindquarters long and gently sloping. Movement should be active, strong, straight and free, not heavy or ponderous, with good flexion and freedom in the shoulders. Most solid colours are acceptable, including bay, brown, grey, chestnut, black and dun, and excessive white markings are discouraged.

The breed standard defined by the Irish Draught Horse Breeders Association, and followed by the equivalent organization of Great Britain and Canada, states that "The Irish Draught Horse is a versatile, powerful and athletic animal with substance and quality. It has a pleasant head, good bone and a short shin, good spring of rib, strong loins and hindquarters, and an active powerful stride. Known for its good temperament, docility and willing nature, it has a robust constitution and is inherently sound. The Irish Draught horse is a foundation breed that, when crossed with other breeds, will produce all types of leisure and performance horses."

A 2012 report indicated that 9 inches was the minimum cannon bone circumference desirable for the breed, and "is cited in historical and current breed descriptions as an important characteristic of the ID as a foundation breed". The study analysed canon bone measurements of RID and Class 1 stallions taken from their studbook inspections over multiple decades, and found that there had been a statistically significant shift towards smaller cannon bone sizes over the prior 30 years, appearing to have started around 1989, which had not been reversed, until more recent years when some stallions have been presented with bone similar to pre-1989 measurements.

== Breed history ==
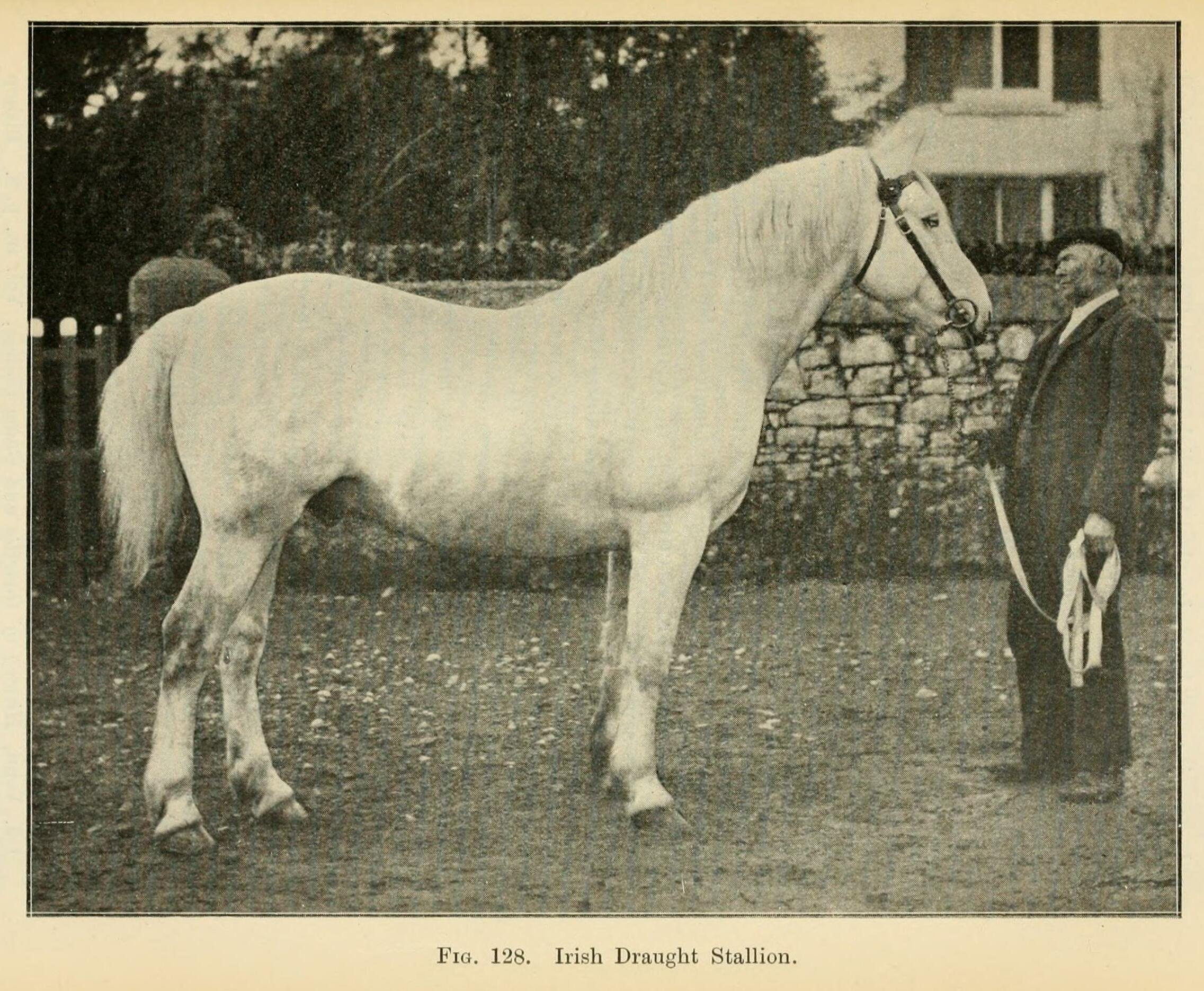
Irish Draught stallion (circa 1905)

References to the Irish Draught date back as far as the 18th century. It is believed that the breed was developed when the then-common Irish Hobby was successively bred with 12th-century Anglo-Norman war horses; Iberian horses from 16th-century Spanish Armada shipwrecks; Clydesdale and Thoroughbred stallions in the late 19th and early 20th centuries; and local Connemara ponies. Crossbreeding with Clydesdales, which were used in some areas for heavier haulage, resulted in a taller animal, but at the cost of stamina and conformation; these qualities were negated by the introduction of Thoroughbred blood.

The Irish Draught was bred to be an all-round working horse, suitable for draft work, under harness and under saddle. There was also a need for Irish Draughts to be economical to keep, and this was achieved by grazing throughout the summer and supplementing their feed with chopped foraged gorse, boiled turnip and leftover cattle feed.

Irish Draught Horse pedigrees had been recorded since at least the start of the 20th century, when the government introduced registration for stallions and mares in 1907 and 1911 respectively, subject to inspections of the animals, and offering subsidies towards this. The stud book was opened by the Ministry of Agriculture in 1917, establishing a foundation stock of 375 mares and 44 stallions. The original stud book records, however, were lost in the fire of the Four Courts in 1922. Their use in the Great War in the allied military led to large losses, and the mechanization of the 20th century saw a decline in their traditional use as farm and carriage horses. Large numbers were sent to the slaughterhouse and abroad for use in breeding.

=== Preservation ===
In 1976, the Irish Draught Horse Society was founded to preserve the breed, with an external branch in Great Britain emerging in 1979. A horse board, Bord na gCapall, was also founded in 1976 (later resurrected as the Irish Horse Board in 1993), in order to promote the breeding and use of horses other than Thoroughbreds in the country. In 2008, control of the Irish Horse Register, which contains the registry of both the Irish Draught and Irish Sport Horse, was handed from the Irish Horse Board to Horse Sport Ireland. In November of the same year, the Irish Draught Horse Breeders Association was formed by members of the Irish Draught Horse Society. Increased interest in the breed internationally has led to the formation of Irish Draught societies and registries in many countries, including Canada, the US, Australia and New Zealand. In 2011 and 2012, the representative bodies of Ireland, Great Britain and Canada agreed to harmonize their breed standard and inspection criteria.

It is the Irish Draught's popularity as a foundation animal for the production of sport horses that has put the breed at risk a second time. Many Irish Draught mares never produce a purebred replacement for the herd. Aggressive selection for show jumping characteristics has degraded the foundation stock, and inbreeding to a few popular stallions has further endangered the genetic diversity of the breed. (Note: Made possible by shipping of chilled and frozen semen) The Irish Draught is considered an "endangered maintained" breed by the Food and Agriculture Committee of the United Nations. In 2024, the breed was listed as "threatened" on The Livestock Conservancy's Conservation Priority List. The Irish Draught Horse Society of Ireland, with support from the Royal Dublin Society and technical assistance from the Irish Cattle Breeding Federation, have spearheaded research into a breeding plan to improve genetic diversity, and to maintain the traditional breed traits that are the defining characteristics of the Irish Draught breed.

In an attempt to guide breeders in producing healthier progeny, annual inspections of adult horses listed on the studbook were introduced by Horse Sport Ireland, with other registries later following suit. These inspections are used to produce a linear profile which is included in each studbook entry, and identifies areas in which the animal may deviate from the standard, so as to help in determining the animal's suitability for breeding. A 4-tier classification system was also introduced in place of a pass/fail system, in order to list animals on the studbook that do not meet the breed standard, with an aim to improve the genetic diversity of the breed.

- Class 1 horses have both passed the official veterinary examination and met the breed standard criteria.
- Class 2 horses do not meet the breed standard, but have passed the official veterinary examination. The offspring of a Class 2 horse is eligible for inspection to be upgraded to Class 1.
- Class 3 horses have failed the official veterinary examination, and are not recommended for breeding. Their progeny are not eligible for upgrading.
- Class 4 horses have not yet been examined, and could meet either of the other classification standards upon examination. Their progeny are not eligible for upgrading.

There is also a supplementary section in the Horse Sport Ireland studbook in order to recognise horses which may be primarily registered as Irish Sport Horses, but conform to the standard of the Irish Draught.

The Irish Draught studbook in many countries does not admit animals on a pass or fail basis; instead, animals are invited to undergo an inspection which assesses the athleticism, movement and conformation in order to determine how closely they match the standard, after which they are classified according to the 4-tier system.

== Uses ==
Irish Draughts are commonly crossbred with Thoroughbreds and Warmbloods to produce high-quality sport horses. This cross is termed the Irish Sport Horse (or Irish Draught Sport Horse in the US). Demand for the Irish Sport Horse has led to a thriving export of horses for use in competition. The purebred Irish Draught is also popular in eventing, showing and as a hunter, as well as police mounts due to their temperament and strength.

== See also ==
- Horse Sport Ireland
