= Highland pony =

Breed of horse

Highland Pony
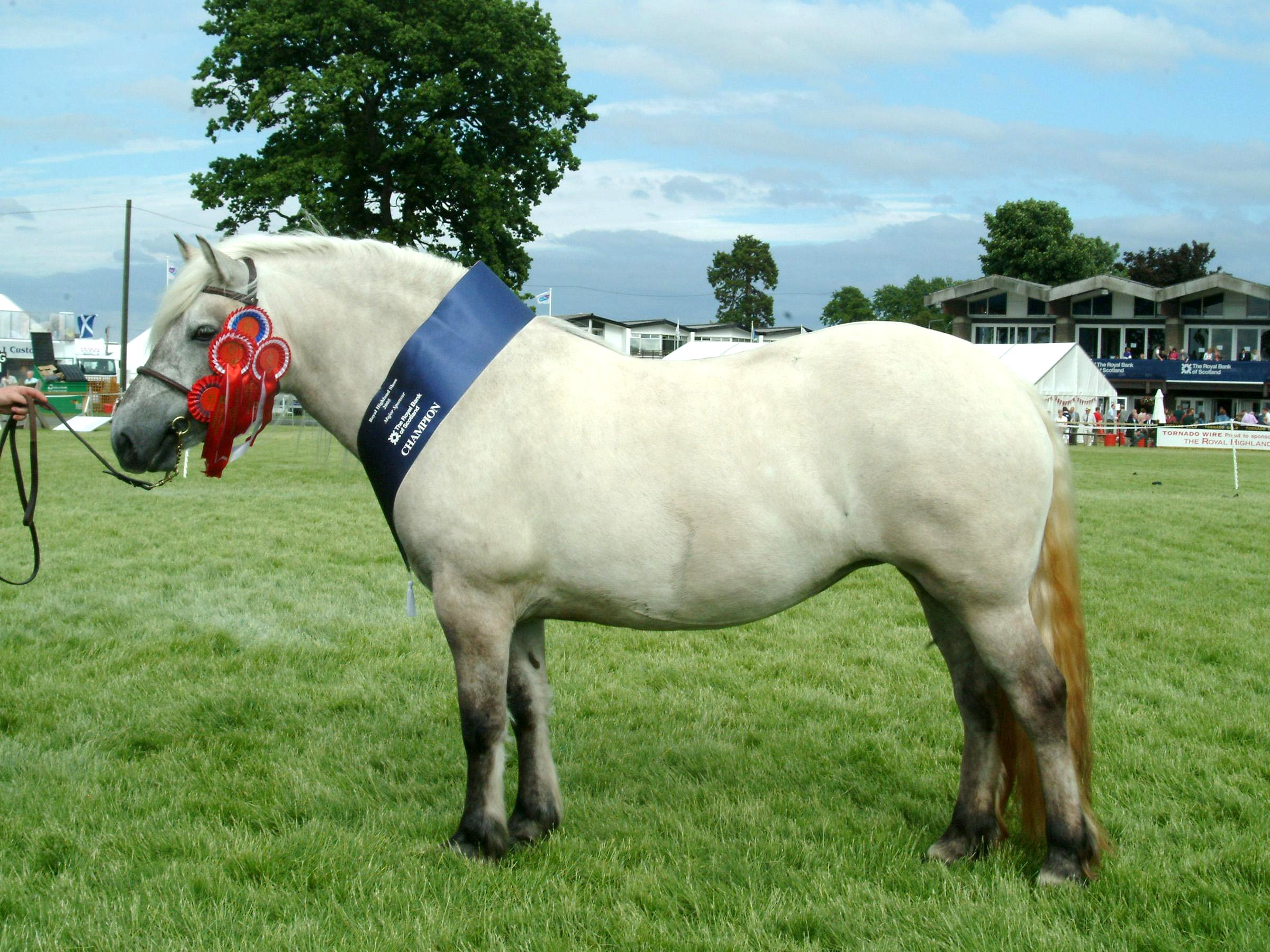
- Highland Pony Champion at the Royal Highland Show 2005
- Country of origin: Scotland

Breed standards
- Highland Pony Society; Highland Pony Enthusiasts Club of America

The Highland Pony is a native Scottish pony, and is one of the largest of the mountain and moorland pony breeds of the British Isles. Its pedigree dates back to the 1880s. It was once a workhorse on the Scottish mainland and islands but today is used for driving, trekking and general riding. They are hardy and tough, rarely require shoeing and are economical to keep.

== Breed characteristics ==
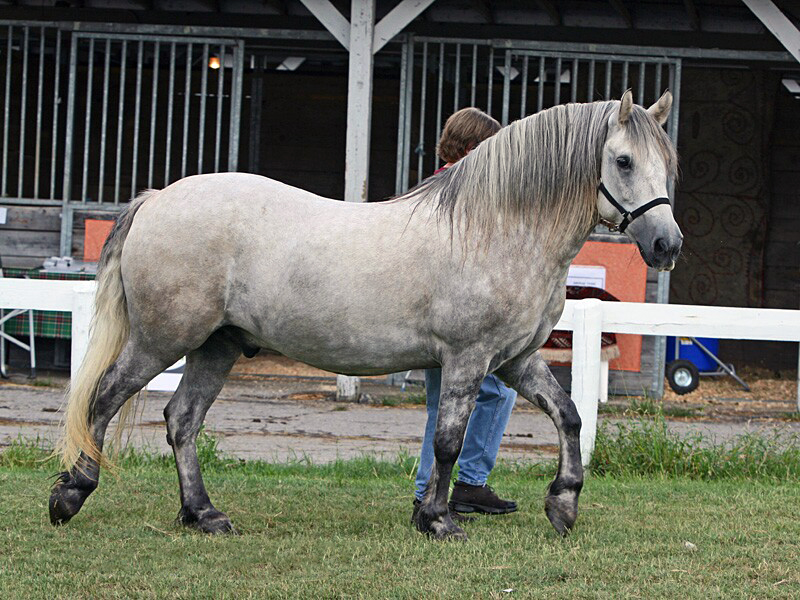
A grey Highland Pony

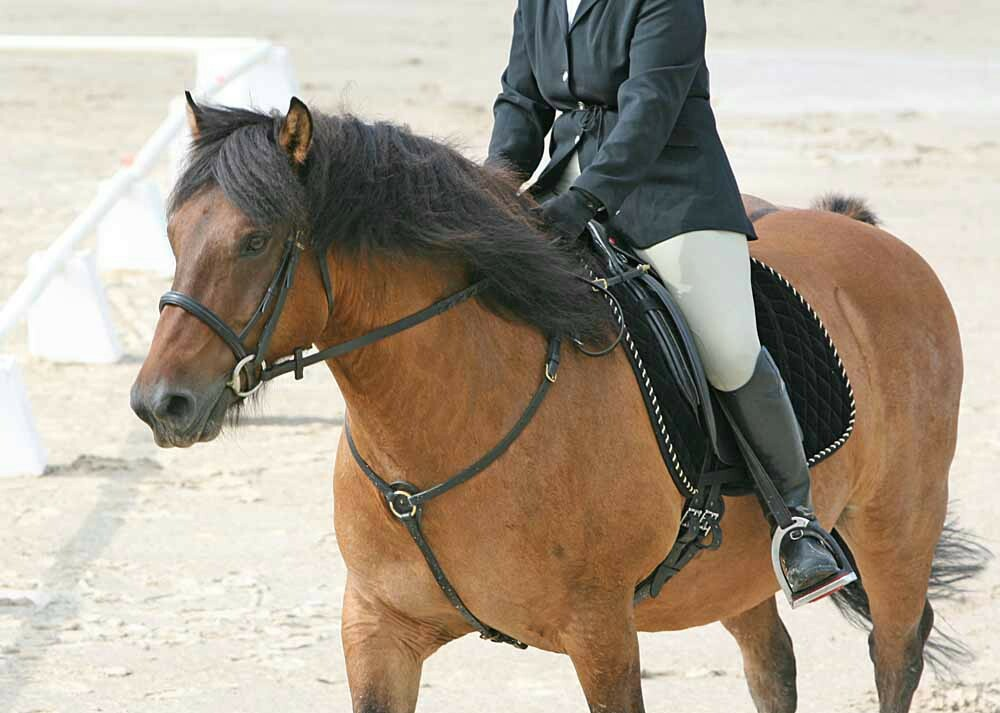
Highland Pony under English saddle

The Highland Pony is one of the three native breeds of the Scottish Highlands and Islands, the others are the Shetland Pony and the Eriskay Pony. Over many centuries, the breed has adapted to the variable and often severe climatic and environmental conditions of Scotland. The winter coat consists of a layer of strong, badger-like hair over a soft, dense undercoat, which enables this breed of pony to live out in all types of weather. This coat is shed in the spring to reveal a smooth summer coat. This essential hardiness is combined with a kindly nature and even temperament.

The ideal height of a Highland Pony is 13 to 14.2 hands (52 to 58 inches, 132 to 147 cm) but can reach 15hh. The head is well-carried and alert, with a kindly eye, broad muzzle, and deep jowl. A reasonable length of neck goes from the withers with a good sloping shoulder, and well-placed forearms are desired. Ponies are to have a well-balanced and compact body with a deep chest, well-sprung ribs, powerful quarters with a well-developed thigh, strong gaskin, and clean, flat hocks. Desired traits also include flat hard bone, broad knees, short cannon bones, oblique pasterns, and well-shaped, broad, dark hooves.

Feather hair behind the fetlocks is soft and silky. When Highland Ponies are shown, their manes and tails are kept natural, flowing, and untrimmed.

Highland Ponies are seen in a range of dun shades. The Highland Pony Society recognizes shade variations referred to as "mouse" (known in other breeds as grullo), "yellow" (bay dun), "grey" (dun with gray gene that lightens with age), and "cream" (a dun apparently also possessing a dilution factor). Other, nonstandard terms, such as "fox dun", (describing a red dun) "oatmeal dun", and "biscuit dun" (describing a cream dun) are sometimes also used. They also may be grey, seal brown, black, and occasionally bay or a shade of liver chestnut with a flaxen mane and tail.

Dun-coloured ponies have primitive markings, which include a dorsal stripe and some show zebra markings on their legs. A transverse shoulder stripe is also often present. Foal coat colours often change and many ponies change colour gradually as they grow older. Others show a slight seasonal change in colour between winter and summer coats. "Broken" colours such as pinto are not allowed.

The Highland Pony Society actively discourages white markings of any description other than a small white star. Stallions with white markings other than a small star are not eligible for licensing by the Highland Pony Society. No white markings (other than a small star) nor white legs or white hooves are acceptable in the show ring.

== History ==
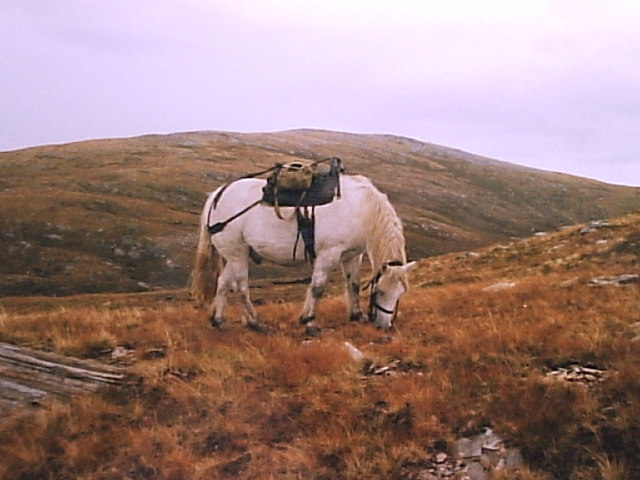
Highland ponies have often been used as deer stalker ponies to carry dead game.

Tracing the history of the breed presents difficulties. In the earliest period of development of the domesticated breed, the two types were the small and light pony of the Western Isles, and the larger and heavier mainland-bred type. The larger animals were commonly called garrons, though the term is considered incorrect. Both types have integrated now, thus generally less distinction exists between the types within the Highland Pony breed. However, the phenotype of the smaller type survives in the rare Eriskay Pony.

In the 16th century, French and Spanish horses, including the Percheron, were taken to the Scottish Highlands. In the 19th century, a Hackney type and the Fell Pony and Dales Pony were added.

The breed was originally bred to work on the small farms of Scotland, hauling timber and game, as well as ploughing. They are still used for such work, but are usually enjoyed as all-round ponies, good for jumping and trekking, due to their quietness, stamina, and ability to carry weight.

An estimated 5500 Highland Ponies remain in the world today, with most in Europe. Although some are still bred for their substance and stamina, the trend is to breed for a pony more suited for riding and driving. The breed is also commonly crossed with Thoroughbreds to produce good eventing horses. Despite increasing popularity, the breed is still categorised as category 4, "at risk", by the Rare Breeds Survival Trust.

== See also ==
- Mountain and moorland pony breeds
- Garron
