= Tail (horse) =

Part of a horse

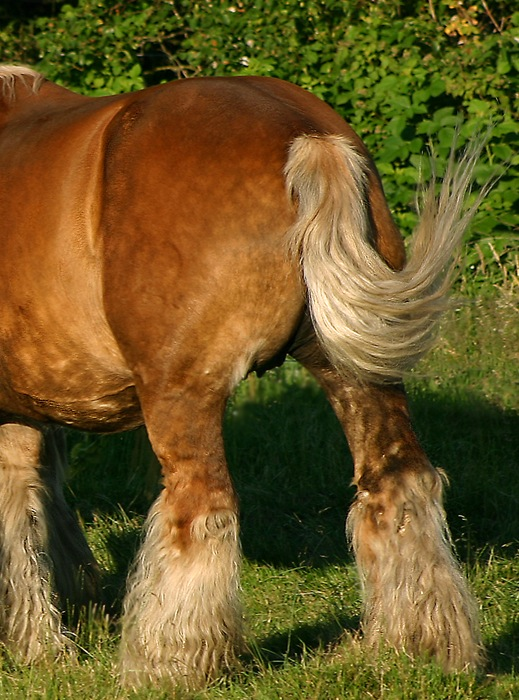
The tail of a horse

The tail of the horse and other equines consists of two parts, the dock and the skirt. The dock consists of the muscles and skin covering the coccygeal vertebrae. The term "skirt" refers to the long hairs that fall below the dock. On a horse, long, thick tail hairs begin to grow at the base of the tail, and grow along the top and sides of the dock. In donkeys and other members of Equus asinus, as well as some mules, the zebra and the wild Przewalski's horse, the dock has short hair at the top of the dock, with longer, coarser skirt hairs beginning to grow only toward the bottom of the dock. Hair does not grow at all on the underside of the dock.

The tail is used by the horse and other equidae to keep away biting insects, and the position and movement of the tail may provide clues to the animal's physical or emotional state. Tail carriage may also be a breed trait. Tails of horses are often groomed in a number of ways to make them more stylish for show or practical for work. However, some techniques for managing the tails of horses are also controversial and may constitute animal cruelty.

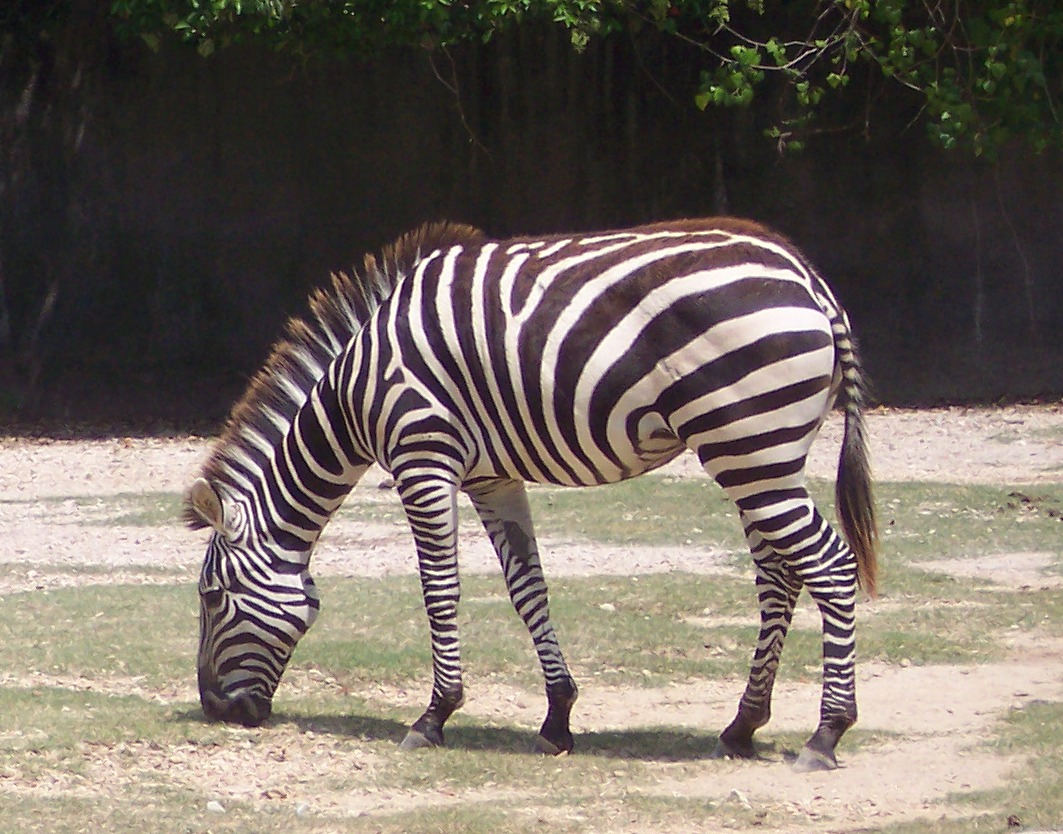
The tail of a zebra has short hairs along the top of dock, and long hair only grows from the bottom

== Communication and behavior ==
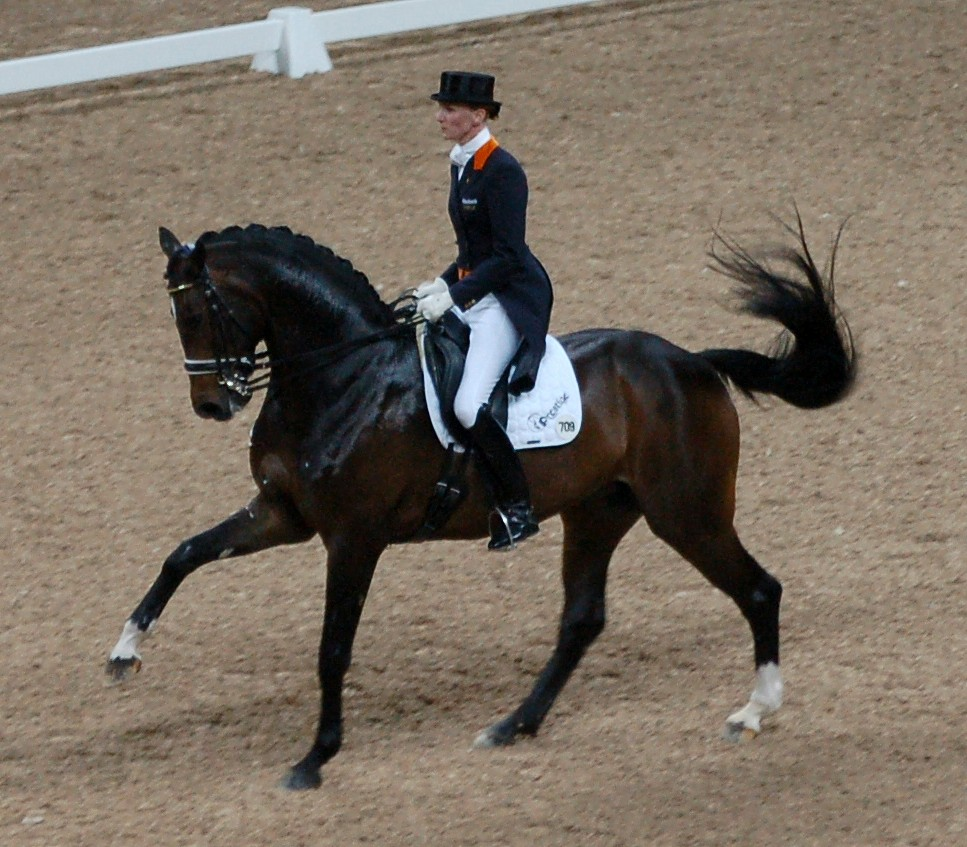
A horse may move or "wring" its tail sharply to express displeasure with a rider's commands

The tail can communicate basic information about the horse's physical condition or state of mind. A high-carried tail often reflects high spirits, while a tail tucked in tightly to the buttocks often indicates discomfort. A horse will carry its tail higher and farther from its body the faster it goes. A horse must also raise its tail to defecate, and certain digestive disorders, such as gas colic, may include the clinical sign of the tail being carried higher and farther from the body than is typical for a particular animal.

A horse that is irritated or unhappy may violently swish its tail from side to side, and an extremely angry animal may go so far as to wring its tail up and down as well as side to side. A horse that is content will usually have the dock of the tail in a relaxed state, not moving other than to sway with the natural movement of the animal.

In cold weather, horses may stand with their hindquarters facing into the wind and their tails clamped tightly to their buttocks in order to protect their bodies from the weather. If veterinary treatment involves inspection of the anus, or in a mare, the vagina, the horse may clamp down its tail in order to protect these sensitive regions, though a human handler is usually able to move the tail away by bringing it sideways.

A horse may stomp its hind feet and swish its tail as a precursor to kicking, but sometimes the tail movement and the actual kick come in quick succession before the recipient of the kick is able to avoid it. A horse that is about to buck may sometimes tense and curve or "kink" its tail in a distinctive fashion, although this action will not be visible to the rider, who is generally facing forward.

When in harness or under saddle, the horse may express displeasure or resistance to a handler's commands, particularly a rider's leg command to move forward, by twisting or wringing its tail. The use of spurs may result in particularly strong expressions of irritation. Because tail-swishing can indicate a horse resistant to a rider's commands, the practice is generally penalized at horse shows in events where manners or responsive performance are judged.

== Breed and color ==
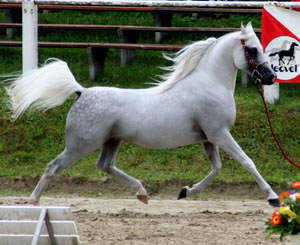
A purebred Arabian, showing high-carried tail desired in the breed

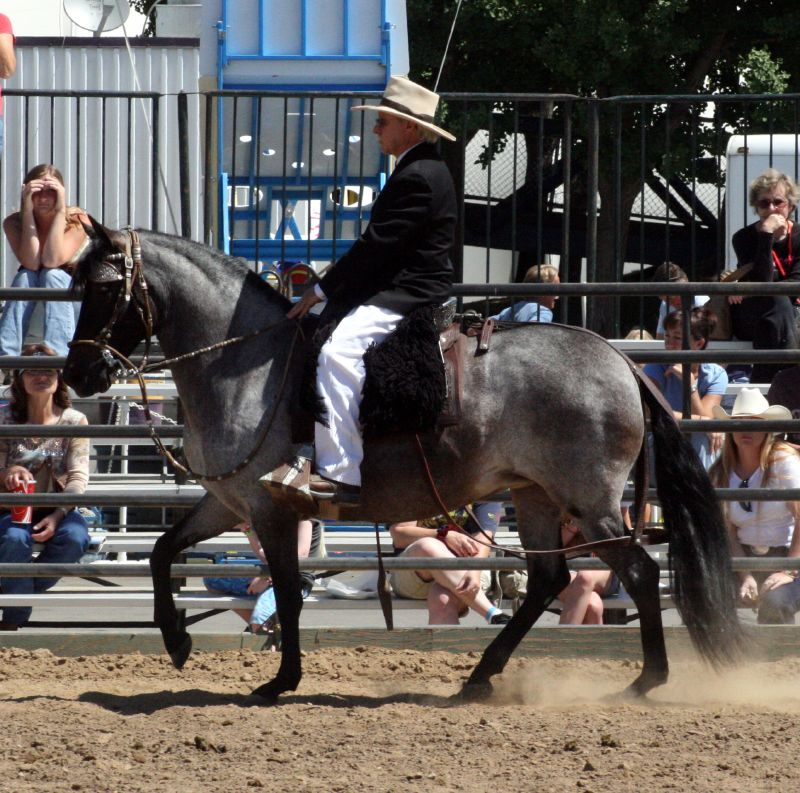
The Peruvian Paso breed has a tail carried low and in a quiet manner.

In certain breeds, a high- or low-carried tail is considered a breed conformation trait. Thick or thin hair may also be a breed trait as well as straight or wavy hair.

Color of the tail is linked to the overall equine coat color of the horse and is generally not a breed trait unless the overall color is selected for within a breed. However, in coat colors where point coloration occurs, the tail is one part of the anatomy that will exhibit the contrast color, along with the mane, lower legs, and tips of the ears. In the case of primitive markings, the mane and tail will usually be the same color as the striping that is characteristic of these colors.

== Grooming and styles ==
Basic tail grooming enhances the appearance of the horse and promotes the health of the hair and skin. Horses that are placed into work or competition often have their tails cut, braided or styled in a number of ways. For pleasure riding, the tail is usually brushed or combed to remove tangles and foreign material. Horses used in exhibition or competition may have far more extensive grooming. Certain types of show grooming can inhibit the ability of the horse to use its tail for defense against insects.

The tail may be encouraged to grow as long as possible, and sometimes even has additional hair artificially attached. Other times, it may be clipped, thinned, or even cut very short (banged). A few breeds are shown with docked tails.

=== "Natural" grooming ===
A "natural" tail, is not clipped or braided, and is commonly seen in many competitive disciplines, including most western performance disciplines and some English riding events, particularly at lower levels. The tail may be encouraged to grow as long as naturally possible and may have the skirt kept braided when not in competition to encourage longer growth. In some breeds, a natural tail, neither thinned nor artificially enhanced, is a show requirement.

=== Thinning ===
Tails can be thinned and shaped by pulling hairs out. A pulled tail is where the hairs are pulled along the side of the dock to present a tidy or trimmed look. It thins the top portion of the tail while leaving a full skirt. Another form of thinning is to pull the longest hairs in the skirt of the tail, to make the tail shorter and less full, though retaining a natural shape—a technique that was once in fashion.

=== Cutting and clipping ===
Banging the tail is quite common, particularly in Europe. It involves cutting the hair of the skirt straight across at the bottom, usually well below the hocks. This style is common in dressage. In some nations, banged tails are also seen in other disciplines and may be considered standard grooming. Tail extensions, described below, are often sold with a banged bottom, and therefore the banged style is sometimes seen in some western riding disciplines where rules permit a false tail. However, in western competition, false or cut tails are not allowed in all breeds, and the banged tail is currently popular but not a traditional look.

Sometimes, the shorter hairs on the dock are clipped, sometimes only for a few inches from the base of the tail, in other cases as long as about halfway down the dock, roughly where the tail "turns over" when the horse is in motion. The rest of the tail is kept long. This is claimed to show off the horse's hindquarters. It is most commonly seen in dressage and in areas where dressage styling prevails. A variation, shaving the dock close to the skin for about half its length, was also once a styling fad for "three-gaited" American Saddlebreds, though is less often seen today. Today, polo horses played in competition often have their docks trimmed or shaved, and the skirt is braided, folded up on the tailbone, and tied off with either a lock of hair excluded from the braid, taped, or both.

=== Braiding ===
French braiding and its variant, Dutch braiding, are common. Tail braiding for show or other competition is often a task for professional grooms. An improperly done braid may fall out if too loose, or if left in too long may cause discomfort and itching to the horse. Braiding of the dock is seldom left in more than 12 hours, as the horse will often begin to itch and rub its hindquarters, either breaking hairs or rubbing out the braid.

Braiding of the dock of the tail, with the skirt left loose, is most commonly seen in show hunters, equitation, and field hunters. The tail is not braided in dressage, as it is thought that an uncomfortable braid may cause the horse to carry the tail stiffly. In eventing and show jumping, the tail is usually not braided, in part for convenience, but also in case a tight braid might inhibit performance.

In draft horse showing and on Lipizzan horses that perform the capriole, the entire tail is generally braided and the braid is folded or rolled into a knot, with or without added ribbons and other decorative elements. For driving horses, keeping the tail out of the way is a safety issue, it could be caught up in equipment. For polo and polocrosse, commonly the entire tail is braided, folded up on the tailbone, and well secured. A loose tail is a safety risk because it can snag a polo mallet. A polo braid is often secured by taping, and sometimes the dock is shaved. In inclement weather, many other show disciplines will allow competitors to put up the skirt of the tail into a similar type of stylized knot known as a mud tail.

Braiding the skirt of the tail only and not the dock is not used in show, but is a common grooming technique for encouraging the tail to grow longer. When the horse is not in competition, the skirt of the tail is braided from the end of the dock to the tip, usually also folded up and covered by a wrap to keep it clean. If most of the shorter hairs of the dock are allowed to hang loose, the horse may still be able to use its tail to swat flies.

=== Fake tails ===
"Tail extensions," also known as "false" or "fake tails," "switches" or "tail wigs," are false hairpieces which are braided or tied into the existing tail to make it longer or fuller. This is sometimes seen when a horse has a naturally short and skimpy tail in a discipline where long tails are desired. False tails are also traditional for some breeds shown in saddle seat disciplines with "set tails," when the dock has been shaped by a tail set, which, by raising the dock, also shortens the skirt of the tail, and a false tail makes the tail look a more natural length. False tails are currently popular in western pleasure and other western riding events for stock horse breeds shown in the United States and Canada. On the other hand, in breeds where a long natural tail is a breed trait, use of tail extensions is illegal for both western and saddle seat horses.

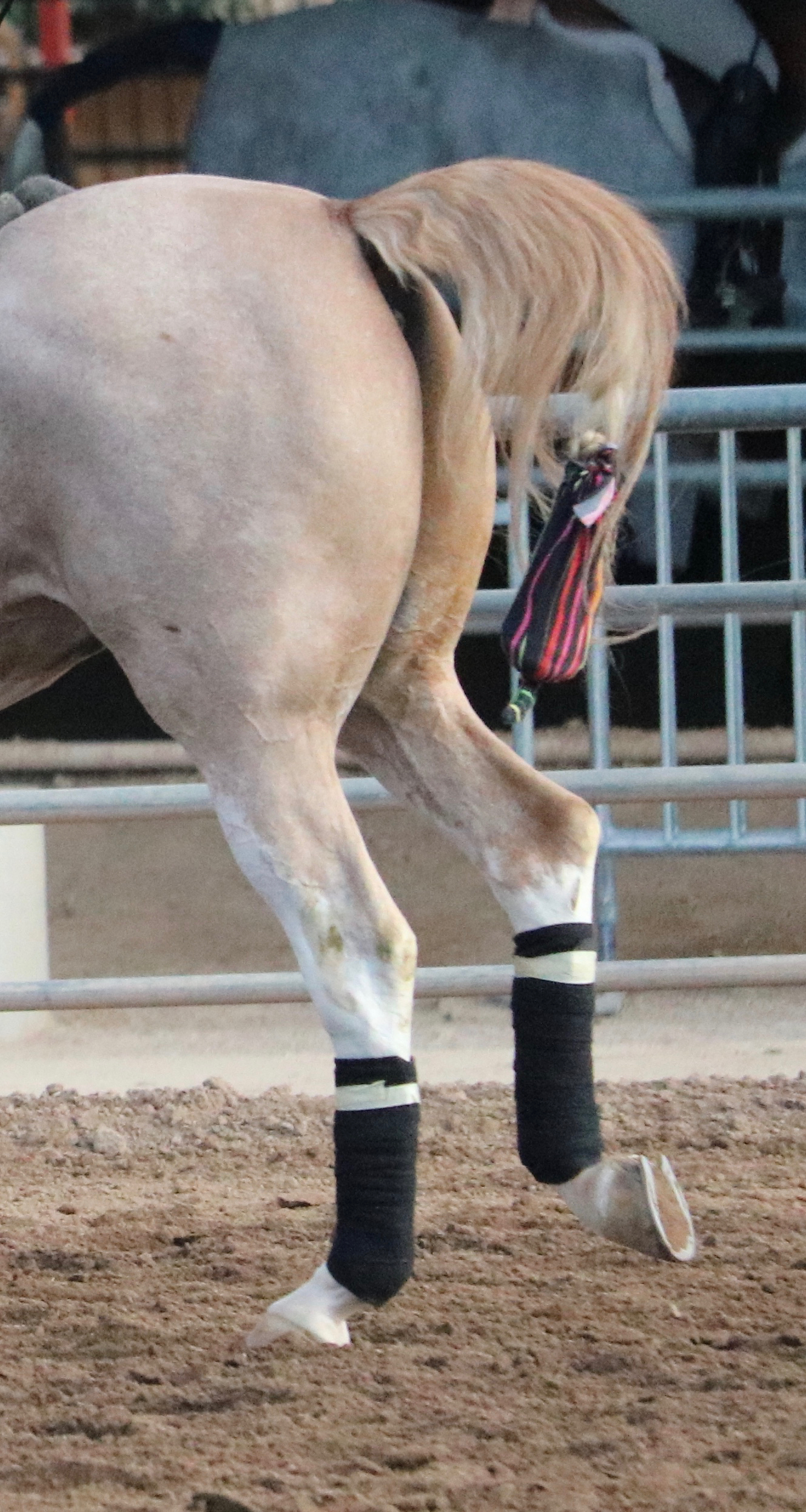
A tail with the long hairs braided and kept in a "tail bag" to keep it clean prior to show

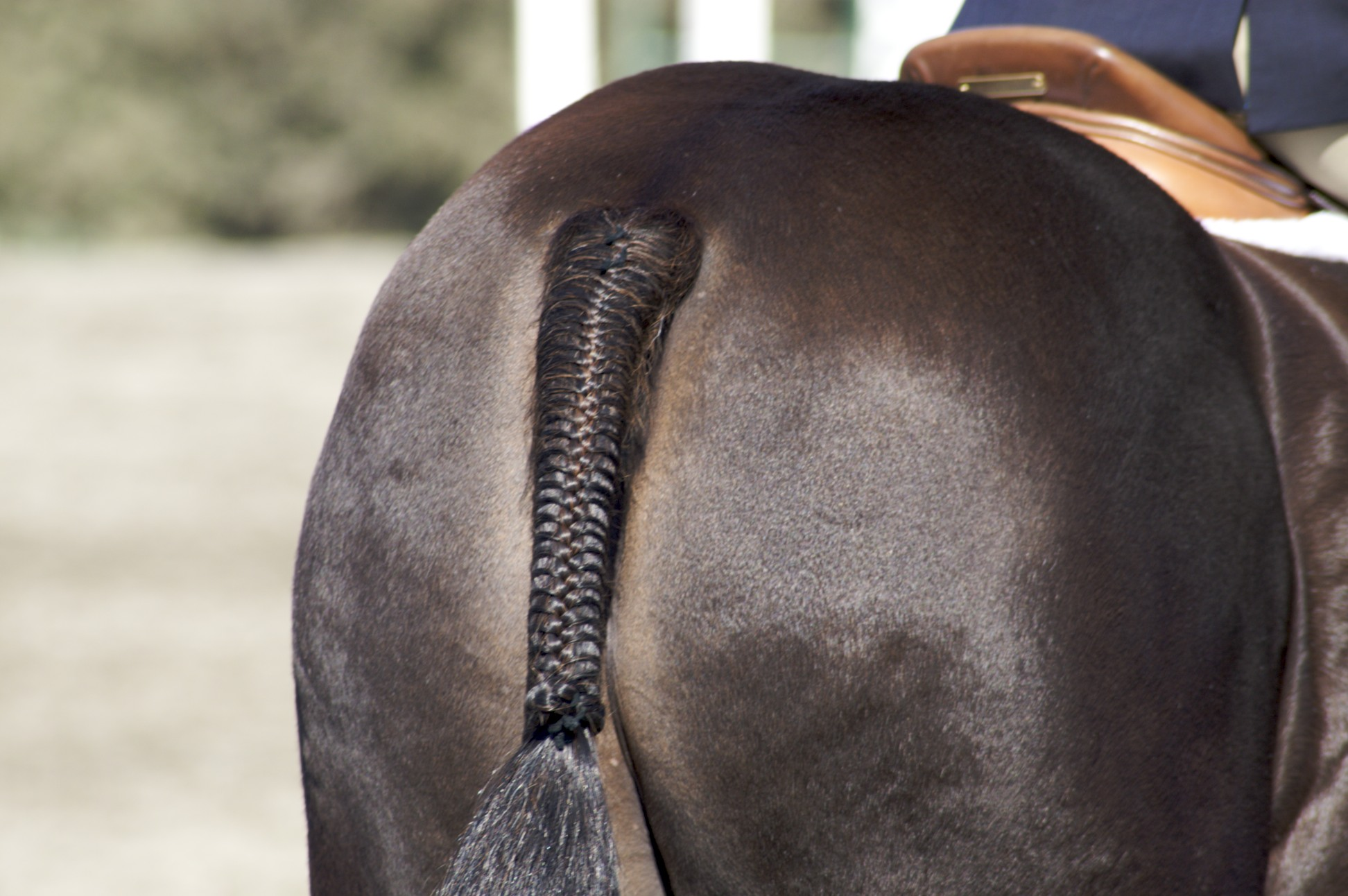
Tail braided for a hunter class

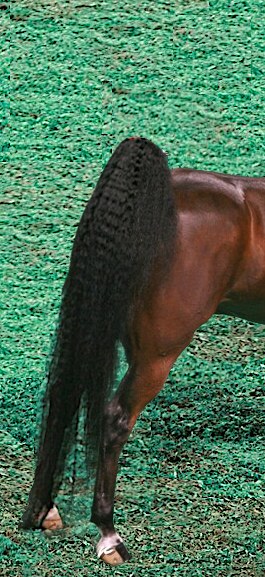
A set tail

== Controversial management ==
=== Docking ===
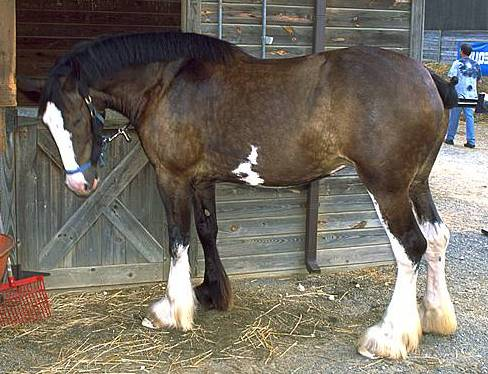
Docked tail on a Clydesdale horse.

In modern use, the term "docking" does not always refer to tail amputation as it does with some dog breeds. However, historically, docking was performed on some horses, often as foals. Prior to mechanization, tail docking of both light and heavy harness horses was common, viewed as a safety measure to prevent the tail from catching in the harness or on the vehicle. In the modern era, where most horse driving is for show rather than daily use, and even for working animals, the time needed to braid or wrap the tail is feasible, so partial amputation of the tail is not generally viewed as necessary.

The practice has been banned in eleven states in the US, but is still seen on show and working draft horses in some places. It is also practiced at some PMU operations. The objections to docking include a concern that the horse can no longer use its tail to swat flies as well as concerns about the pain and discomfort of the docking process itself.

As of 2025 The Animal Welfare Council of Belgium concluded that tail docking was not necessary for draft horses, and the procedure is now banned in Austria, Belgium, Denmark, Finland, Germany, Ireland, Portugal, Norway, Sweden, and the United Kingdom.

Some horses used for driving still have the tail cut especially short to keep it from being tangled in the harness. In these cases, the term "docked" or "docking" only refers to the practice of cutting the hair of the tail skirt very short, just past the end of the natural dock of the tail. Though less drastic than amputation, it can still be difficult for a horse with a very short tail to effectively swat flies.

=== Setting ===
Modern tail setting to raise the tail involves placing the dock of the tail in a harness-like device that causes it to be carried at all times in arched position. The set is used when the horses are stalled, and removed during performances. The device is meant to help stretch the muscles to keep the tail in a position that is desired for show, and is not used after the horse is retired from competition, allowing the tail to relax back to a normal position. Tail setting is only used by a few breeds, such as the American Saddlebred and the Tennessee Walking Horse. Setting, like docking, is not without controversy. In many cases, the check ligament of the tail is nicked or cut prior to placing the tail in a set. The tail obtains the desired shape sooner, and in most cases the ligament heals in a longer position. However, upon retirement, the ligament will sometimes not return to its natural tension, and the animal later may have difficulty swatting flies and holding its tail down and in when needed. However, this method is still less drastic than in the past, when the tail was actually broken and then placed into the tail set, healing in the artificial position. Tail-breaking for high-set tails is no longer used, and tail-nicking is banned in a few states in the United States.

In certain Iberian-descended gaited horse breeds, notably the Paso Fino, where a quiet, low-carried tail is desired, the low tail set was occasionally achieved by actually breaking the tailbone at a certain point so that it would remain in the desired position. The horse can still use its tail to some degree, but cannot keep it raised when in motion. This practice was banned in some nations, and in places such as the United States, a horse with a broken tail, even if imported from a nation where the practice is legal, is permanently banned from the show ring.

=== Gingering ===
Another method of encouraging high tail carriage involves applying an irritant, such as raw ginger or ginger salve, to the horse's anus or vagina. Gingering is a particular issue with halter horses in the Arabian and American Saddlebred breeds, where high tail carriage and animation are desired traits. However, nearly all horse show sanctioning organizations in the USA explicitly forbid it and have the authority to disqualify a horse treated in this way. While some areas may be less than rigorous about enforcing the rule, tests such as "ginger swabbing" may be done to detect the presence of ginger in the anus. While it is not entirely reliable, concerns of being detected by anal tests has led to some horse handlers placing the raw ginger in the vagina, if the horse is a mare.

=== Blocking or numbing ===
Because a swishing tail is penalized in some horse show events, particularly western pleasure and reining classes, handlers sometimes resort to methods, commonly called "blocking" or "nerving" that numb the tail or block the sensation of the nerve endings so it cannot move. Because tail-swishing is often linked to poor training methods, improper use of spurs, or to the horse being "ring sour", i.e. burned-out on competition, artificial methods to keep the tail from moving are illegal in nearly every discipline where trainers are tempted to use it. However, although there are some testing methods available, it is difficult to detect, thus enforcement is a problem. Various techniques are used to numb the tail, most carrying significant health risks. Initially, tail-nicking was used to make the tail lie flat. However, this left a telltale scar. Next, mechanical means such as use of heavy rubber bands to constrict circulation in the tail were used, but these also left marks and could cause visible, permanent damage to the skin, hair and nerves of the tail.

Injections of various sorts began to be used to numb a tail, usually grain alcohol injected directly into the tail at a certain point, sometimes slightly down from the base of the dock so that the horse may appear to carry its tail in a natural manner, but only for the first few inches, and the animal still cannot move the entire tail structure. It is often undetectable, though injections can sometimes leave two white spots above the tail dock. While simple local anesthetics could be used, such medications can show up in drug tests. Conversely, grain alcohol acts locally and degrades the myelin sheaths of the nerves so that the horse cannot move its tail. While promoters of the practice claim that most injections eventually wear off if done carefully, a badly done injection can cause abscesses or permanent nerve damage. Sometimes normal tail function never returns. Another complication that may occur is a temporary inability to defecate and/or urinate due to paralysis of the muscles that control rectum and bladder emptying. In extreme cases, especially if the alcohol injected migrates from the tail to nearby muscles and skin, damage can be so severe that necrosis can set in. Another damaging outcome is the development of ataxia due to nerve damage in the hindquarters.

Blocked tails can be recognized by experienced horse judges, as the tail hangs lifelessly, rather than swaying slightly with the movement of the horse. The animal may also be seen to defecate without raising its tail. In some cases, the discomfort of the injection leads the horse to move stiffly in the hindquarters. Some show-sanctioning organizations have strict penalties for participants who are found to have horses with nerve-blocked tails.

== See also ==
- Horse grooming
- Tail
