= Garron =

Type of horse

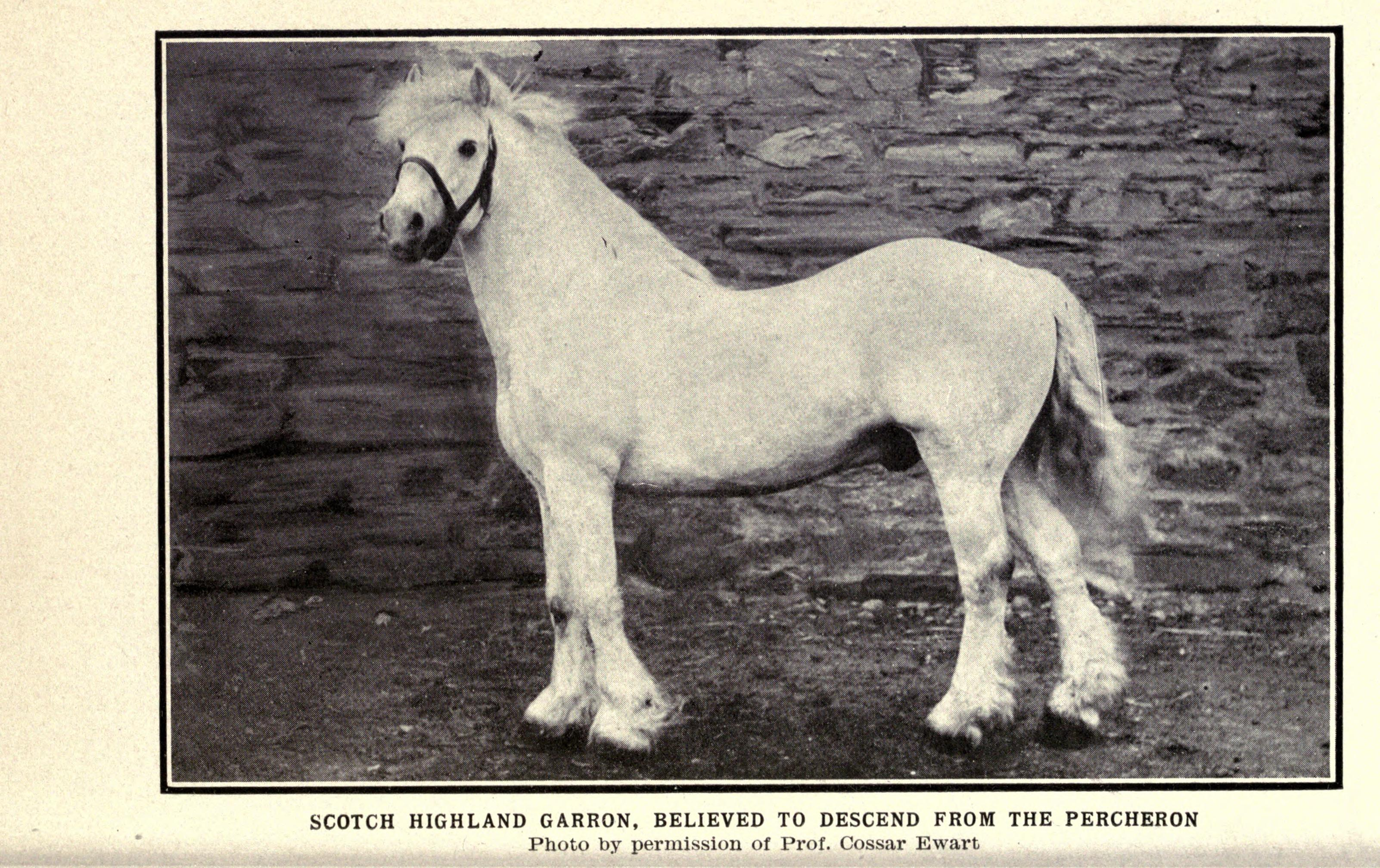
A scotch highland garron

A garron or garran (from Scottish Gaelic: gearran) is a small, sturdy horse or pony. The term occurs in Scotland and Ireland and generally refers to an undersized beast.

In Scotland, a garron is one of the types of Highland pony. It is the larger, heavier type, bred on the mainland. The Isles' kind of pony is generally smaller and slightly finer, but still within the standard of the Highland pony breed. There is less difference today than there once was between these two types.

The word garron may also characterise a Highland cross of a Clydesdale horse with ponies. Farmers used such garrons, especially in the Highlands and Islands, where a full-sized Clydesdale would not have been as economical. These horses were valued for their hardiness and ability to work on slopes. Highland deer-stalking estates kept garrons to bring the stags off the hill, as some still do, for tradition or where ATV access is not practicable.

== Mentions in literature ==
Garrons are mentioned several times in George R. R. Martin's fantasy series A Song of Ice and Fire. There, Garrons are used in cold mountainous areas, generally to the North near the Wall.

R. S. Surtees uses the word in the first chapter of Jorrocks′ Jaunts and Jollities.

Author Nigel Tranter frequently mentions Garrons in his novels about Scottish history, such as "Macbeth, the King."

In the Irish folktale "The Tailor and the Three Beasts," the tailor meets a garron along the way who asks the tailor: "Would you make me a hole... where I could go a' hiding whenever the people are for bringing me to the mill or the kiln".

== See also ==
- Garrano, an ancient Portuguese variety of pony.
