= Fell pony =

Breed of horse

Fell Pony
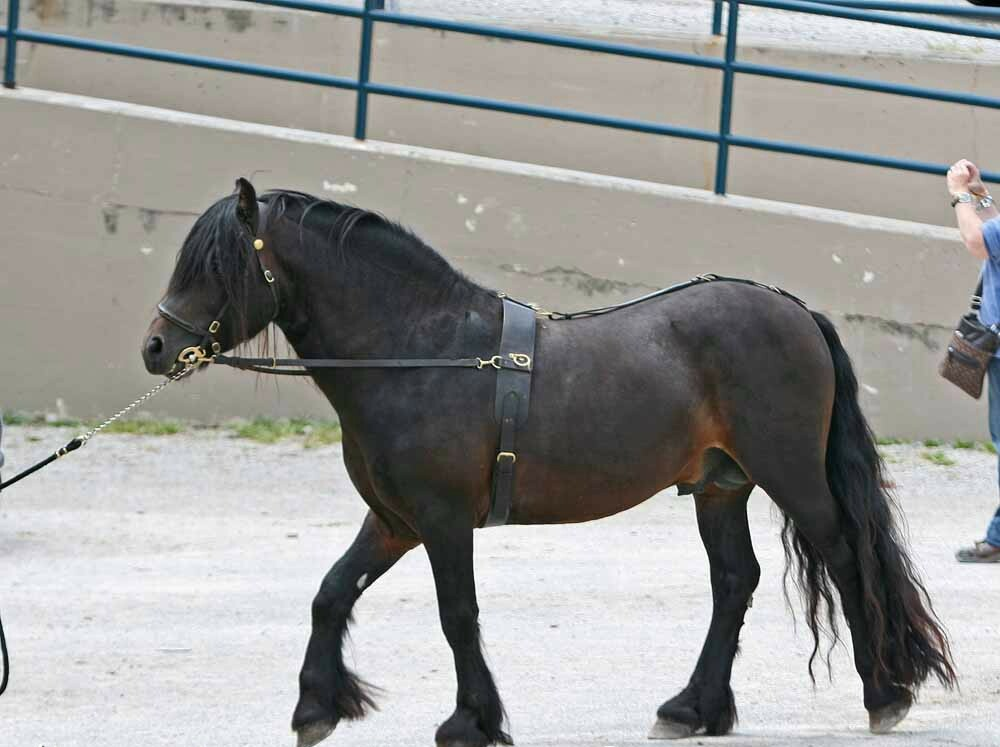

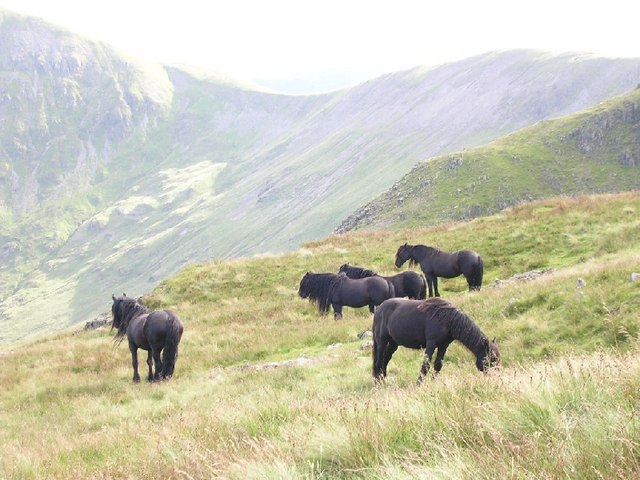
- Country of origin: Cumbria, England

Traits
- Color: predominantly black
- Distinguishing features: Sturdy, feathered legs

Breed standards
- Fell Pony Society (UK); Fell Pony Society of North America

The Fell pony is a versatile working breed of mountain and moorland pony originating on Cumberland and Westmorland farms of northwest England and is used for riding and driving. The breed is closely related to its geographic neighbour, the Dales Pony, but is a little smaller and more pony-like in build. The Fell pony is noted for hardiness, agility, strength and sure-footedness.

== Breed characteristics ==
Fell ponies vary a good deal in weight and size, so ponies may be found to carry almost any rider. The average height of the breed is 13.2 hands (54 inches, 137 cm), and the upper height limit for the breed is 14 hands (56 inches, 142 cm). The breed was bred for the unforgiving mountainous environment of Cumbria in north-west England, so they are adaptable to almost any temperate climate.

Fell ponies are predominantly black. Other colours accepted for registration are brown, bay, and grey. A star on the head and/or a small amount of white on or below the hind fetlock is acceptable. However, excess white markings are discouraged.

The Fell pony should be hardy and show good pony characteristics, including strong, flat bone. It should exhibit intelligence and self-preservation considered common to British mountain and moorland pony breeds, and at the same time, have a lively and alert attitude. The breed generally has a steady temperament.

The Fell pony has the regular gaits, noted for correct movement and is considered sure-footed in rough terrain.

Fell ponies are reliable jumpers and agile, which makes them useful for cross-country riding or hunting. Most animals of the breed lack the scope to make top-class jumping ponies, but Fells generally are well up to local show or Pony Club event standards.

== Breed history ==
The Fell pony shares its origins with the now-extinct Galloway pony, which was also the root of the Dales Pony. It is believed to have originated on the border between England and Scotland, quite probably antedating Roman times. The Fell Pony Society makes no claims about any input from imported Roman war stallions being crossed with these ponies.

In the early stud books, 50% of ponies were brown in colour, though over the last few decades, black has become predominant, followed by brown, bay, and grey.

They are primarily a working breed of pony with activity, stamina, hardiness, and intelligence that enables them to live and thrive in tough conditions out on the fells in the Lake District.

The Fell pony was originally used as a packhorse, carrying slate and lead, copper, and iron ores. They were also used for light agriculture and the transportation of bulky farm goods such as wool. With their sturdy bodies, strong legs, and equable disposition, and being good, fast walkers, they would travel up to 240 mi (390 km) a week. They were favoured by the Vikings as packhorses, as well as for ploughing, riding, and pulling sledges. Their use as pack ponies continued into the 20th century, when they were also used in pack-pony trains and by postal services. Some Fells were famed in the north as fast trotters. Tales are told of distances covered at great speeds by these ponies.

=== Fell Pony Society ===
The Fell Pony Committee resolved to become a society in 1916, "to keep pure the old breed of pony that has roamed the northern hills for years". However, with the end of World War I, the resolution became reality. In 1922, the society restructured itself on "more liberal lines" to attract more members to the support of the Fell pony. Nonetheless, the breed's numbers decreased considerably, until 1945, when a breeding "stallion enclosure" program and a grading-up system were started. The program was discontinued in 1970. In the affluent 1950s, riding for pleasure began to gain popularity, securing the future of many British native breeds. The number of ponies being registered with the Fell Pony Society has risen gradually.

All Fell ponies are registered through the society, with an annual stud book published each year. The society's patron was Queen Elizabeth II.

== Uses ==
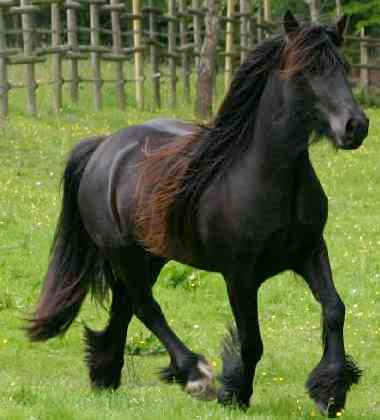
A modern Fell pony

Fells at the present are being used for pleasure riding and competitive uses, pack-work, trekking, and shepherding. The Fell pony can be seen in the horse show world, seen in in hand, under saddle, and working hunter pony classes. They also do well in driving and endurance riding. They are very suitable for riding and driving for persons with disabilities.

A Fell pony can be used as an all-round family pony. It is capable of carrying both children or adults, and versatile enough to fulfill a variety of jobs otherwise carried out by two or three more specialised animals. The rise of carriage driving as a recreational activity has provided the Fell a renewed job, which it traditionally performed for centuries. A few Fell ponies are still used in Scotland carrying the stags and grouse panniers down from the moors. Some of the ponies of Queen Elizabeth II are sometimes used for this purpose at Balmoral, while others are used for both riding and driving by the royal family. Fell ponies have recently been used to carry equipment into the hills for repair of footpaths in the Lake District and they are increasingly being used for British Dressage "Team Quest" competitions (FPS Magazine, Spring 2016, p61)

== See also ==
- Mountain and moorland ponies
