= Connemara pony =

Irish breed of horse

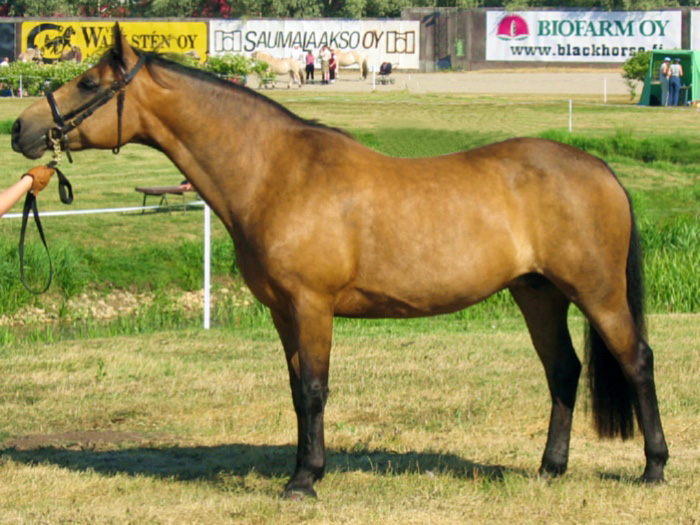
- Connemara mare

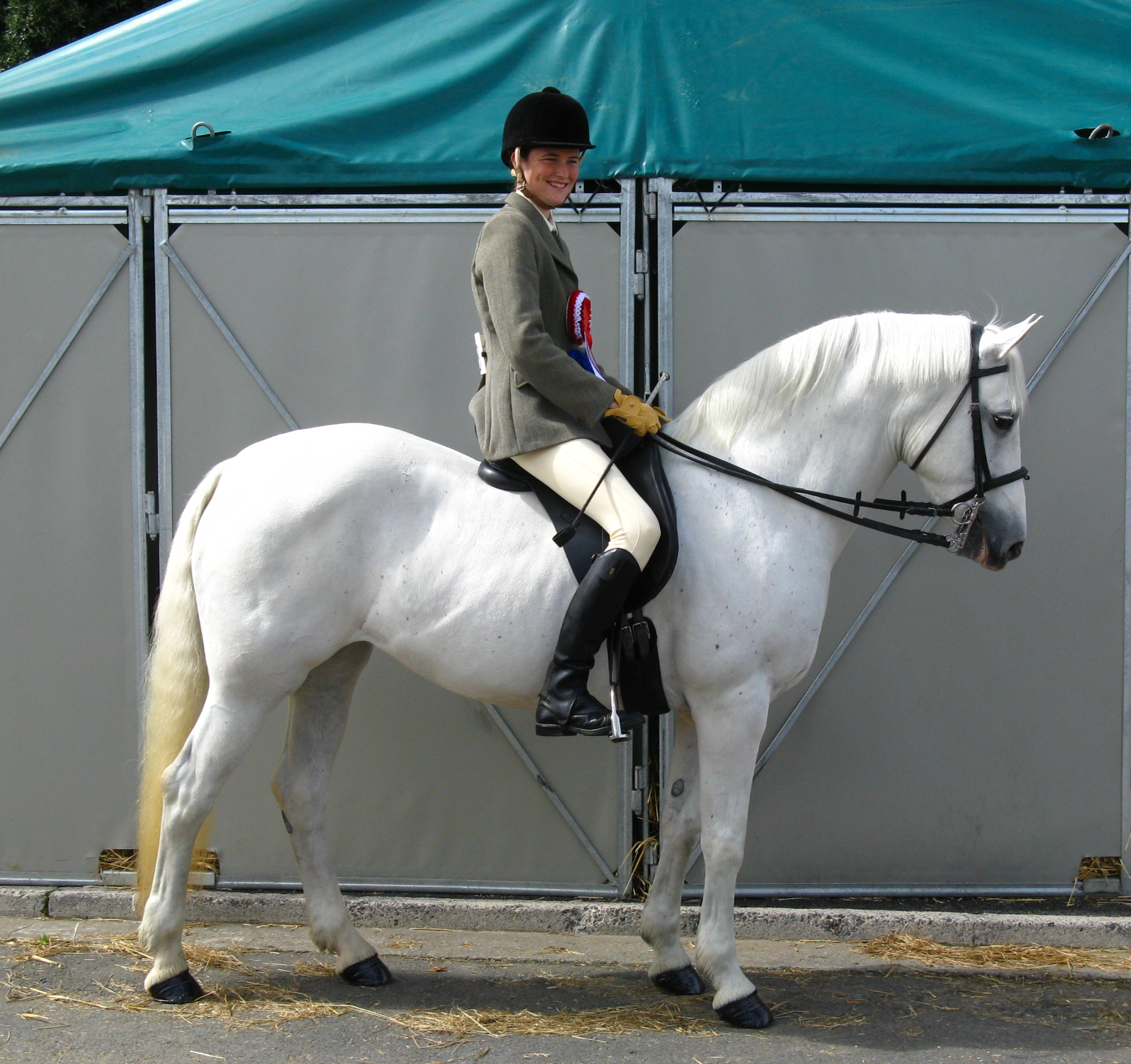
- Connemara pony under saddle
- Country of origin: Ireland

Traits
- Distinguishing features: Good bone, hardy, intelligent, good temperament

Breed standards
- Connemara Pony Breeders' Society; American Connemara Pony Society

The Connemara pony (Irish: Capaillín Chonamara) is a pony breed originating in Ireland. They are known for their athleticism, versatility and good disposition.

== History ==
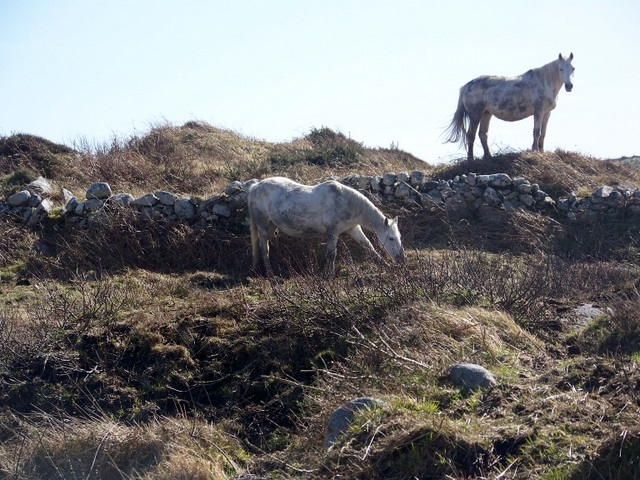
Connemara ponies at Cloch na Rón showing the typical harsh landscape of their place of origin

The Connemara region in County Galway in western Ireland, where the breed first became recognised as a distinct type, is a very harsh landscape, thus giving rise to a pony breed of hardy, strong individuals. It is often thought that the Connemara developed from Norse predecessors of Icelandic ponies that the Vikings first brought to Ireland. Another source was likely the Irish Hobby, a now-extinct breed established prior to the 13th century. Trade between Ireland and Spain was evident as early as the 12th century, and due to similarities between the Irish Hobby and the Spanish Jennet, there is weight to the belief that Spanish ponies imported to Ireland during that time influenced the local ponies. There is also evidence of Barb and Andalusian stallions also being imported from Spain in the 16th century, however the more well-known myth is that galleons from the Spanish Armada ran aground in 1588, and the Andalusians on board were set loose. The Spanish horses bred with the native stock, refining the local ponies.

Due to the Great Famine in the 19th century, life in Connemara was a struggle for those that survived and many were forced to sell their ponies, greatly reducing the number and quality of the ponies in the region. The Congested Districts Board was established in 1891 in order to improve the conditions in the western seaboard, and included responsibilities to improve breeds of local livestock. Different stallions of various breeds, including Barbs, Arabs, Thoroughbreds, Hackneys and Welsh Cobs, were introduced to Connemara in order to try to improve the local ponies by crossbreeding. However, many of the results of these crosses were highly unsuitable for the harsh environment of Connemara and began to dilute the native bloodlines too much, so the Connemara Pony Breeders' Society stud book was established in 1923 to ensure the "preservation and improvement of the Connemara Pony" as the native breed of Ireland. Today, Connemaras are bred worldwide in Ireland and Britain, as well as on the European continent, North America, Australasia, and South Africa.

The Connemara Breeders' Society runs an annual pony show and has been doing so since its founding. The annual show allows the assembly of the largest collection of Connemara Ponies worldwide and is used to buy and sell ponies from Ireland and abroad.

== Characteristics ==
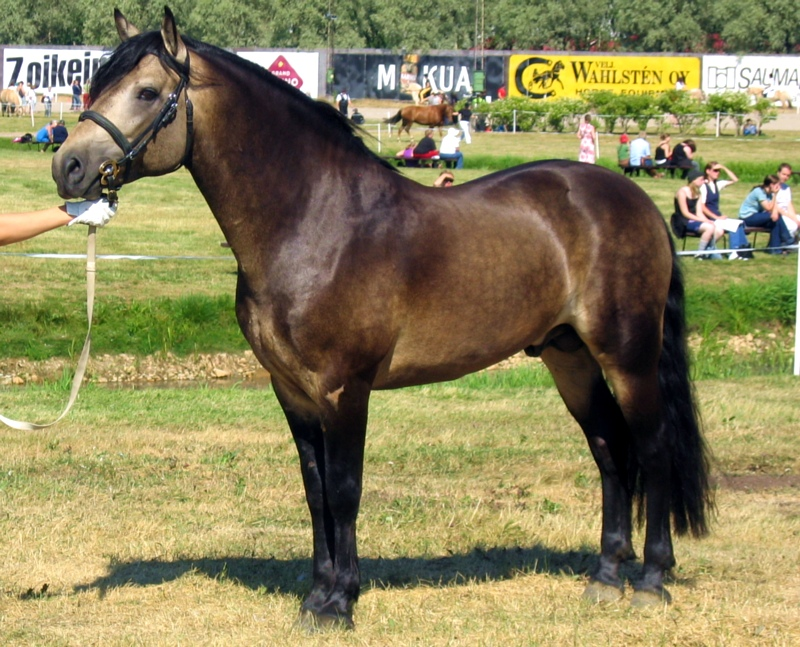
Connemara stallion

The original breed standard is set by the Connemara Pony Breeders' Society of Ireland, and also used by the British Connemara Pony Society. The adults are usually 128 to 148 cm (12.2 to 14.2 h; 50 to 58 in) in height, with a strong back, loins, and hindquarters, deep and broad through the ribs, and with a riding-type well laid-back shoulder and well-placed neck without undue crest, giving a good length of rein. The head should be of pony type, broad between the eyes, which should be large and appear kind, and with a deep but refined jaw and clearly defined cheekbone. The ears should be of pony type (relatively short). The legs should be relatively short from the knees and hocks to the ground, with a strong, muscular upper leg, strong and well-defined knees and hocks, and well-shaped hard feet, which are of a medium size. The action should be free, active, and easy. Permitted colours are grey, black, brown, bay, dun, roan, chestnut, palomino, and cream. Pinto colouring (piebald and skewbald) is not accepted.

The Connemara Pony should be intelligent with a good temperament, suitable for adults and children; it should be hardy with good endurance; it should be sure-footed, sound, and able to jump. If a Connemara pony is to be passed as grade 1 on inspection by the Connemara Pony Breeder's Society, it must meet the breed standard; if it does not meet this specification, then it will be given a grade 2 or 3 on inspection. Connemaras in North America range from 13 to 15 hands (52 to 60 inches, 132 to 152 cm).

Some Connemara Ponies carry the autosomal recessive disorder hoof wall separation disease and all foals born are tested as part of the registration process.

== Uses ==
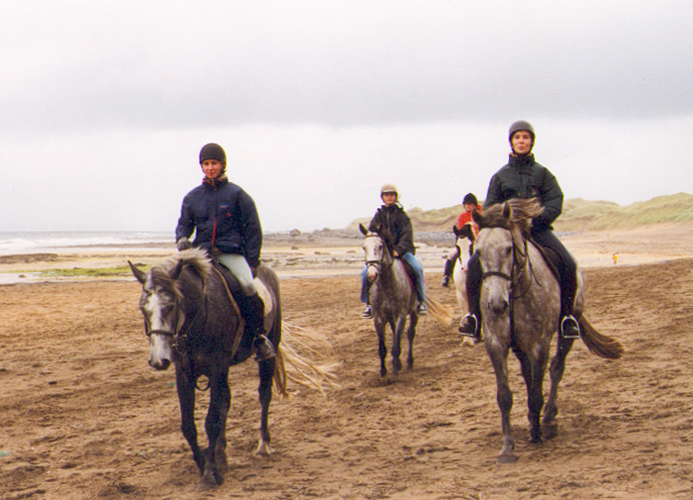
Connemara ponies ridden for recreation

The Connemara is best known today as a sports pony. Ridden by both children and adults, it is considered to be a very versatile pony breed, competitive in show jumping, dressage and eventing, but also with the stamina for endurance riding. They are also shown in harness. Connemara Pony shows are held worldwide, with particular popularity in Ireland and the United Kingdom.

Connemara Pony Sales are Ireland's largest and leading sale of Connemara ponies, with four sales held annually in February, May, August and October in Clifden. They can be viewed via video-stream online, allowing easier access for potential buyers to view a selection of ponies. In 2021 the highest price for a pony sold at the sales was topped at €14,000 for a 3 year old.

== See also ==
- Mountain and moorland pony breeds
