= Field hunter =

Type of horse

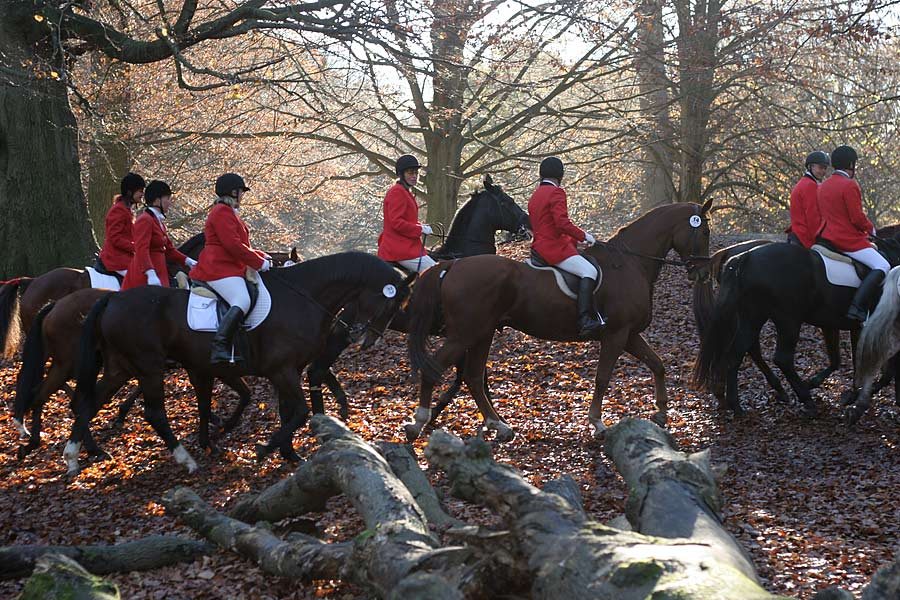
A group of field hunters in Denmark.

A field hunter, or a fox hunter, is a type of horse used in the hunt field for fox hunting and stag hunting.

== Characteristics ==
The field hunter may be of any breed, but should possess stamina, a level head, and bravery. The horse should have a safe jump, so as not to get caught on any of the solid obstacles found in the hunt field. The type of terrain is also an important factor: wide open, flat land is generally best for horses of a Thoroughbred type, while rockier, more unforgiving land may be best suited by a draft-cross or tougher breed.

== Field hunter trials ==
Field hunter trials are regularly held to test these horses, and have become a popular form of equestrian competition. Often the horses are judged over several days of fox hunting, with the best of the group performing in the "handy hunter" class. The handy hunter class may ask for the horse and rider pair to trot a log, open and close a gate while mounted, jump several fences, and for the rider to dismount and remount. The horse is judged on its manners, way of going, as well as its suitability as a hunter.

== The field hunter vs. the show hunter ==
In some ways, the field hunter is more similar to a good cross-country horse seen in eventing than a show-ring hunter, as it must gallop and jump over varied terrain, jump ditches, coops, up and down banks, and occasionally go through water.

Unlike the field hunter, the horse known in the US as a show hunter and in the UK as a working hunter performs in a ring, usually over a course of 8-10 fences. The judging of the American show hunter is based on the requirements of a horse in the hunt field, focusing on the horse's manners, movement, jumping form, rhythm, and smoothness around the course. Show hunters in the US are usually warmblood or Thoroughbred types. They do not have to have the bravery required of the field hunter, nor do they travel over the same type of terrain, as the field or arena is usually fairly level. Although the fences in a show hunter course are usually "natural" poles and standards, as opposed to the brightly colored fences seen in show jumping, the show hunter course does not include rock walls, ditches, or banks that might be seen in the hunt field. The British working hunter is not required to jump obstacles exactly like those met in the hunting field, although a water tray is sometimes used to simulate a ditch, and natural dips in the ground, banks etc. are often incorporated into the course in order to make it more challenging.

== Point-to-point ==
Horses of field hunter type may also compete in certain race completions such as point-to-pointing. In the United Kingdom, with the exception of Hunt Members races, all horses that compete in point-to-point must be registered by Weatherbys—in the General Stud Book or Non-Thoroughbred Register. Horses and jockeys must have qualified with a pack of foxhounds, harriers, bloodhounds or draghounds by "riding to hounds". Horses must be ridden to hounds on four or more occasions during the hunting season that immediately precedes the point-to-point season, and belong to a member, subscriber or farmer of a recognised pack.
