= Equine conformation =

Evaluation of a horse's bone and muscle structure

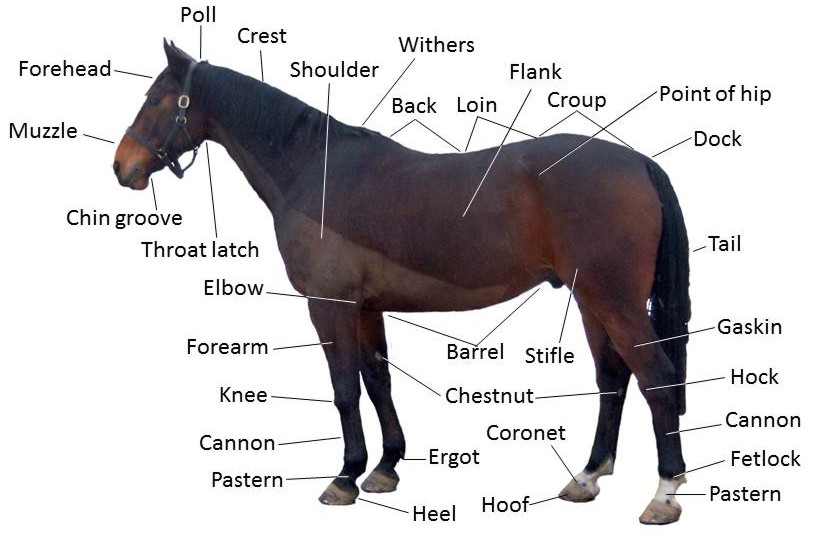
Points of a horse

Equine conformation evaluates a horse's bone structure, musculature, and its body proportions in relation to each other. Undesirable conformation can limit the ability to perform a specific task. Although there are several faults with universal disadvantages, a horse's conformation is usually judged according to its intended use. Thus "form to function" is one of the first set of traits considered in judging conformation. A horse with poor form for a show jumper could have excellent conformation for a cutting horse or draft horse. Every horse has good and bad points of conformation and many horses excel even with conformation faults.

The following is a list of desirable or faulty characteristics of the 'points' of a horse, or its anatomical parts, concentrating especially on North American breeds.

== Head and neck ==
The standard of the ideal head varies dramatically from breed to breed based on a mixture of the role the horse is bred for and what breeders, owners and enthusiasts find appealing. Breed standards frequently cite large eyes, a broad forehead and a dry head-to-neck connection as important to correctness about the head. Traditionally, the length of head as measured from poll to upper lip should be two-thirds the length of the neck topline (measured from poll to withers). Presumably, the construction of the horse's head influences its breathing, though there are few studies to support this. Historically, a width of 4 fingers or 7.2 cm was associated with an unrestricted airflow and greater endurance. However, a study in 2000 which compared the intermandibular width-to-size ratio of Thoroughbreds with their racing success showed this to be untrue. The relationship between head conformation and performance are not well understood, and an appealing head may be more a matter of marketability than performance. Among mammals, morphology of the head often plays a role in temperature regulation. Many ungulates have a specialized network of blood vessels called the carotid rete, which keeps the brain cool while the body temperature rises during exercise. Horses lack a carotid rete and instead use their sinuses to cool blood around the brain. These factors suggest that the conformation of a horse's head influences its ability to regulate temperature.

=== Face ===
The front of a horse's face when viewed from the side will usually be straight from the forehead to the nostrils. A Roman nose is a facial profile that is convex, and is often associated with draft horses. A dished face is a concave profile with a dip in the face between the eyes and nostrils, usually associated with Arabians. The muzzle is the lower end of the head, and includes the nostrils, upper and lower lips, and the front teeth.

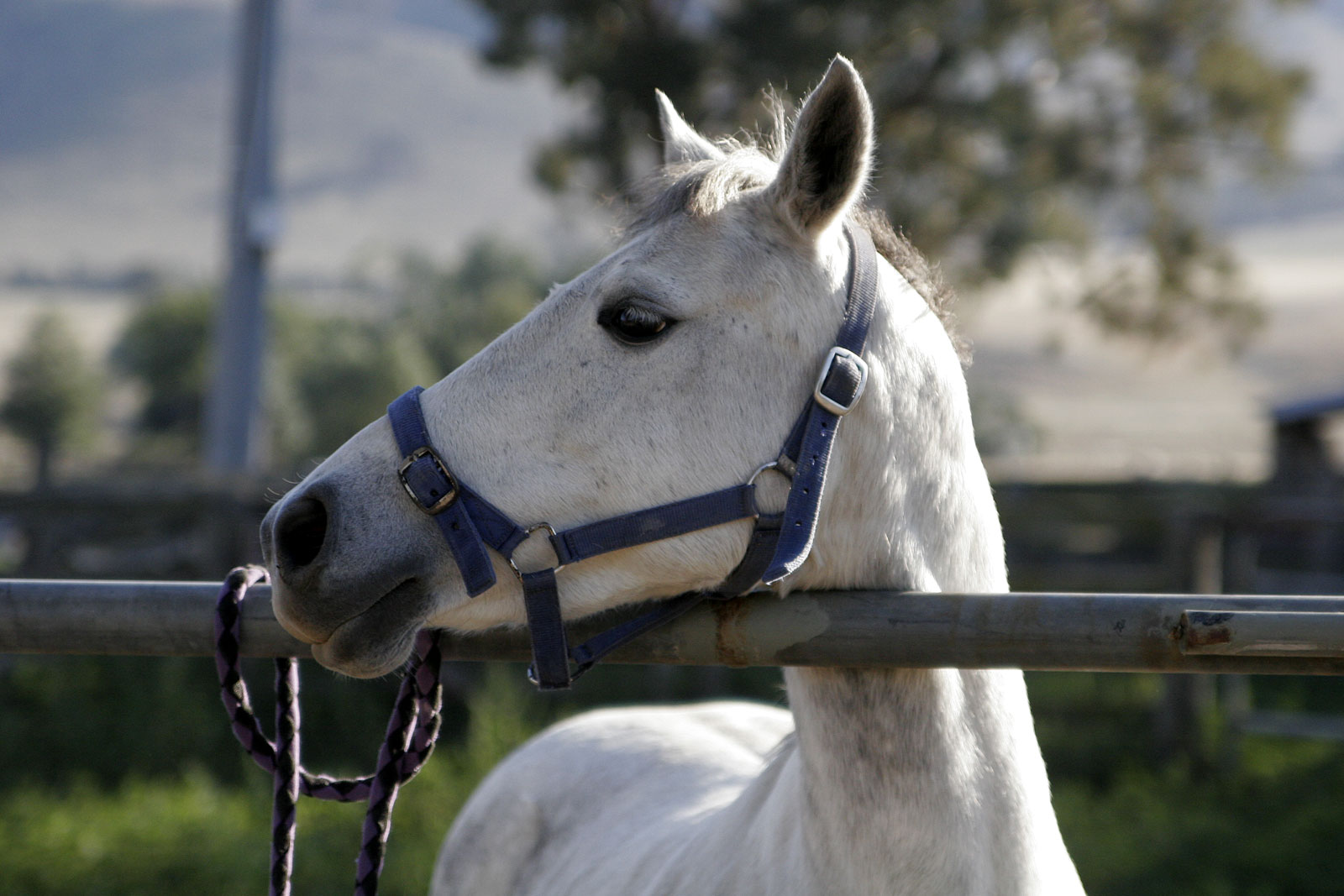
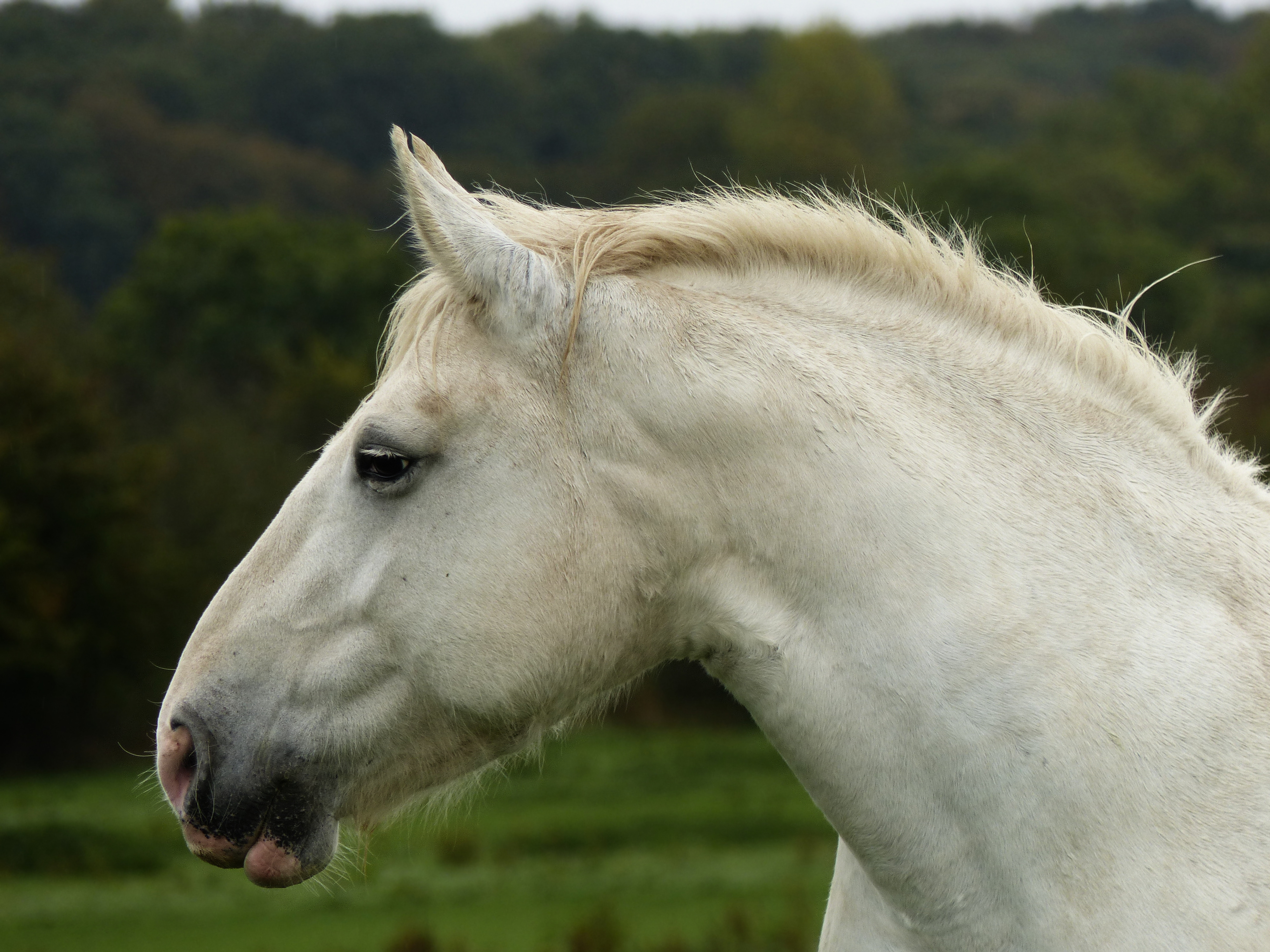
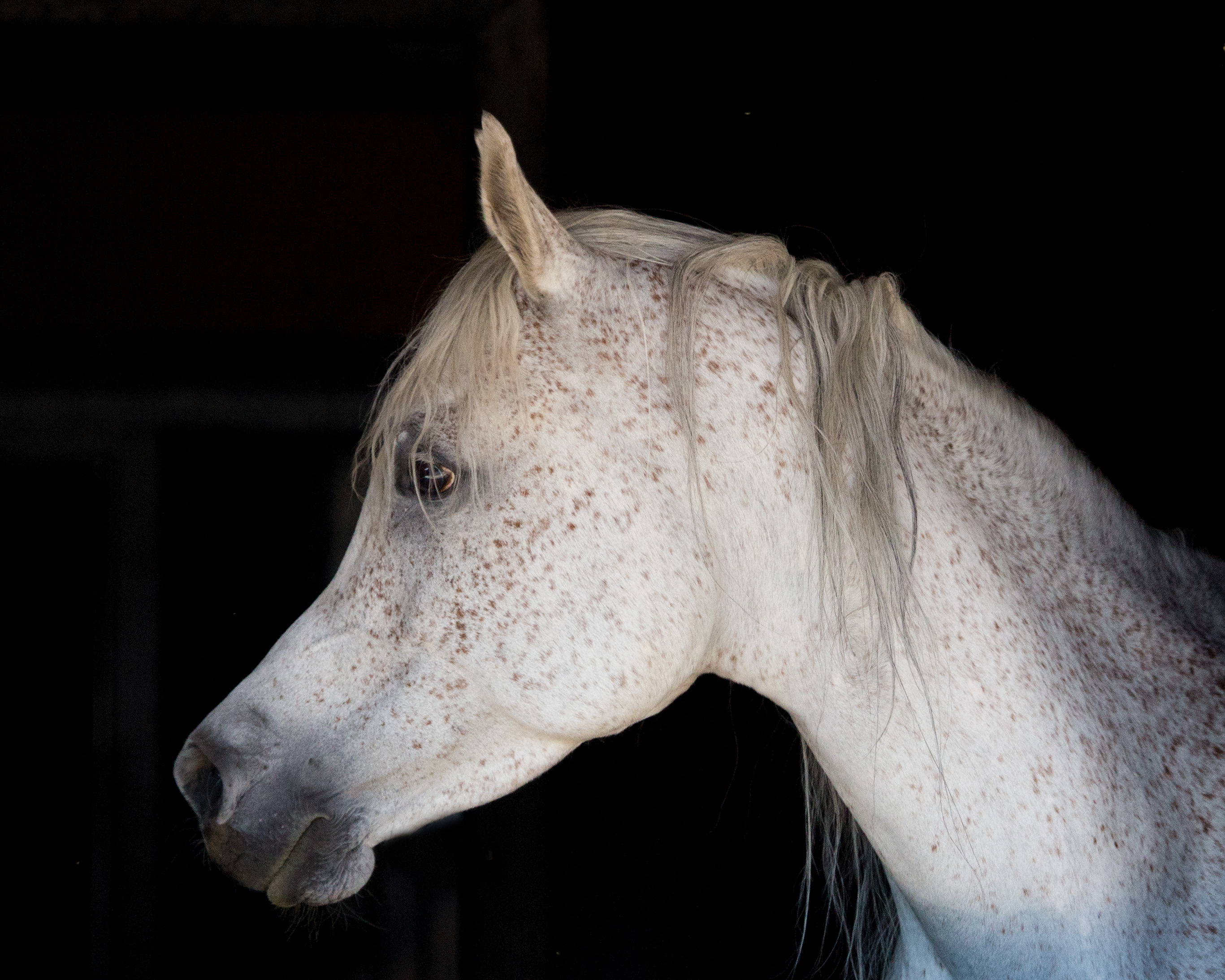
Facial profiles (from left to right): Straight faced, Roman nose, dished face

=== Eyes ===
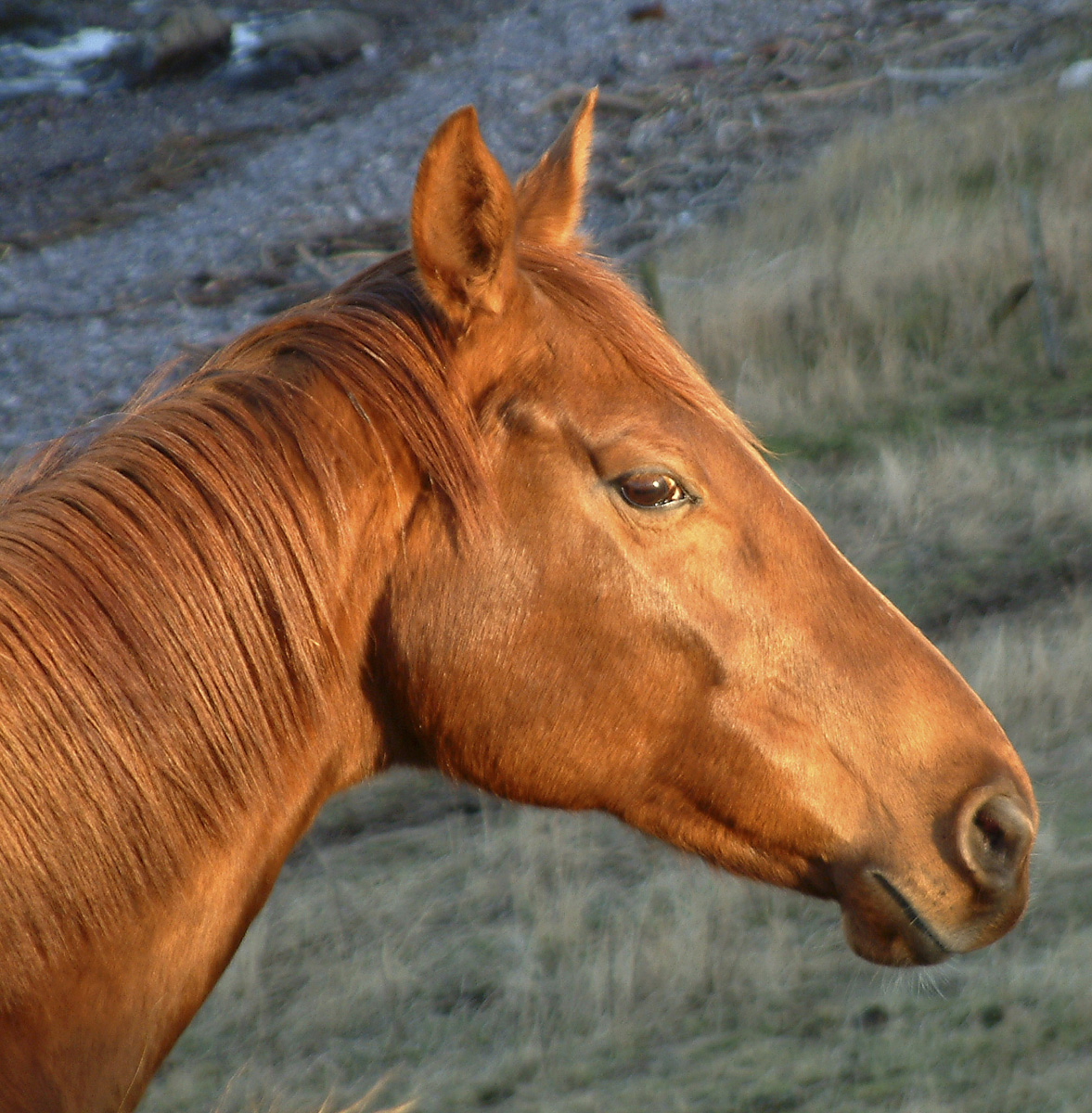
Pig-eye

- A horse with pig eye has unusually small eyes. This is primarily an aesthetic issue, but claimed by some to be linked to stubbornness or nervousness, and thought to decrease the horse's visual field.

=== Jaw size ===
- The lower jaw should be clearly defined. The space between the two sides of the jawbone should be wide, with room for the larynx and muscle attachments. The width should be 7.2 cm, about the width of a fist.
- The jaw is called narrow if the width is less than 7.2 cm.
- The jaw is called large if it is greater than 7.2 cm. A large jaw gives head a false appearance of being short and adds weight to the head. Too large a jaw can cause a reduction to the horse's ability to flex at the poll to bring his head and neck into proper position for collection and to help balance.

=== Jaw position ===
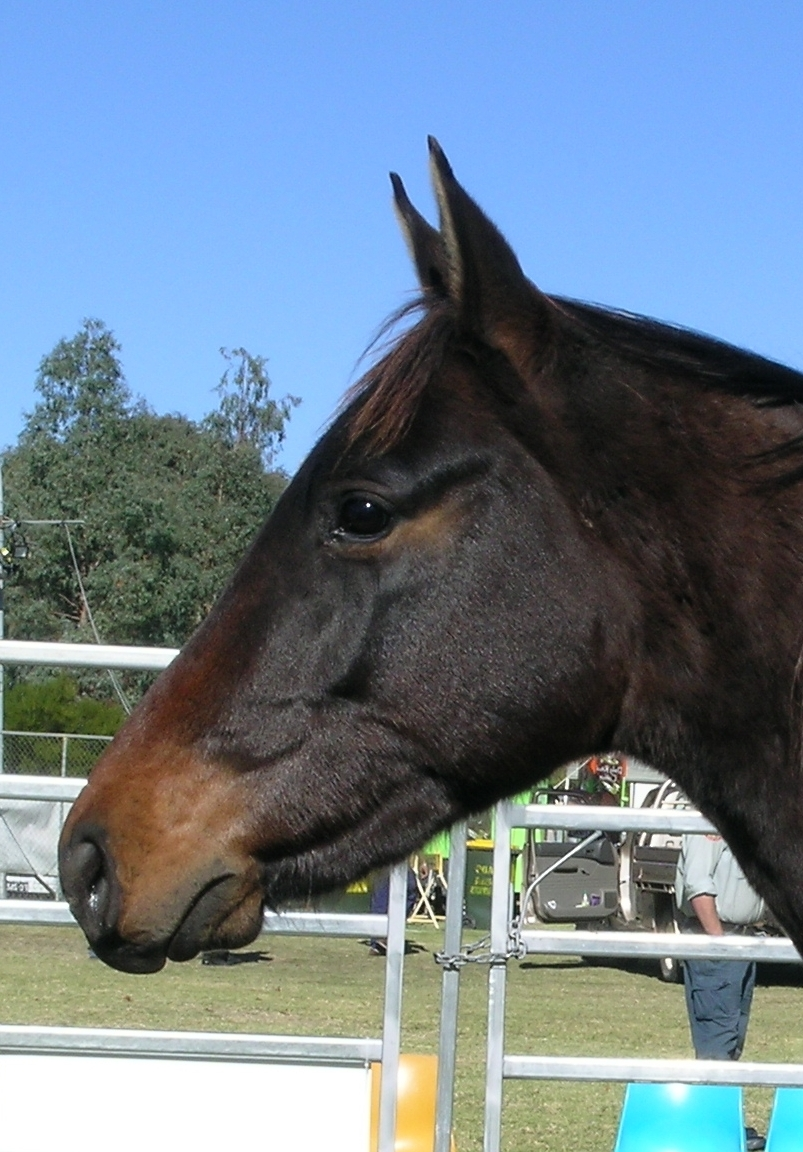
A parrot mouth

- A parrot mouth is an overbite, where the upper jaw extends further out than the lower jaw. This can affect the horse's ability to graze. Parrot mouth is common and can be managed with regular teeth floating by a veterinarian.
- A monkey mouth, sow mouth, or bulldog mouth is an underbite, where the lower jaw extends further out than the upper jaw. This is less common than parrot mouth. This can affect the horse's ability to graze. Monkey mouth is common and can be managed with regular teeth floating by a veterinarian.

=== Ears ===
- Ears should be proportional to the head. They should be set just below the level of the poll at the top of the head. Ears should be a position where they can be rotated forward and backward. Ears that are too large or too small may make the head seem too small or large in proportion with the body.

=== Neck length and position ===
- A neck of ideal length is about one third of the horse's length, measured from poll to withers, with a length comparable to the length of the legs.
- An ideally placed neck is called a horizontal neck. It is set on the chest neither too high nor too low, with its weight and balance aligned with the forward movement of the body. The horse is easy to supple, develop strength, and to control with hand and legs aids. Although relatively uncommon, it is usually seen in Thoroughbreds, American Quarter Horses, and some Warmbloods. Horizontal neck is advantageous to every sport, as the neck is flexible and works well for balancing.
- A short neck is one that is less than one third the length of the horse. Short necks are common, and found in any breed. A short neck hinders the balancing ability of the horse, making it more prone to stumbling and clumsiness. A short neck also adds more weight on the forehand, reducing agility.

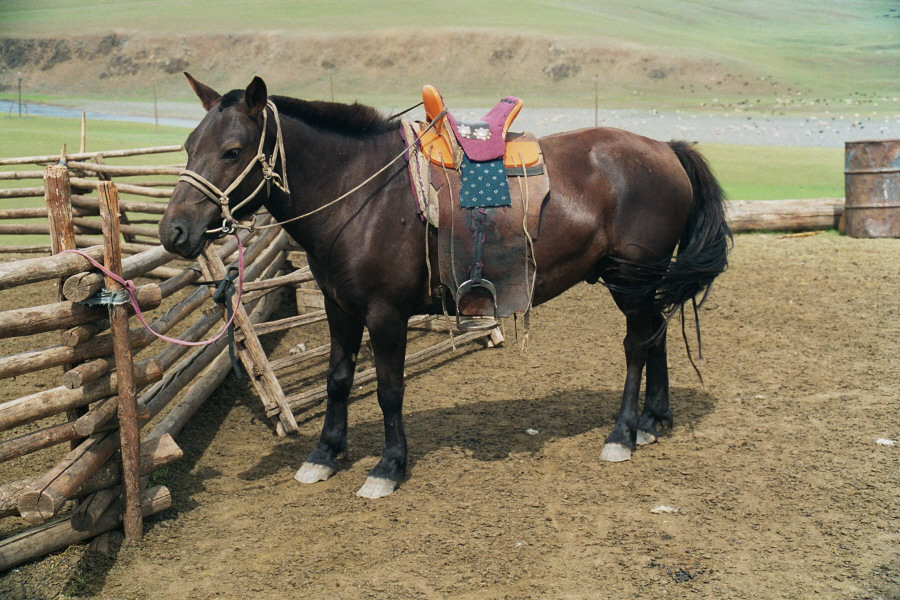
Bull neck: short and thick

- A short, thick, and beefy neck with short upper curve is called a bull neck. The attachment to its body is beneath the half-way point down the length of shoulder. Bull neck is fairly common, especially in draft breeds, Quarter Horses, and Morgans. Bull neck makes it more difficult to maintain balance if the rider is large and heavy or out of balance, which causes the horse to fall onto its forehand. Without a rider, the horse usually balances well. A bull neck is desirable for draft or carriage horses, so as to provide comfort for the neck collar. The muscles of the neck also generate pulling power. A horse with bull neck is best for non-speed sports. Bull neck is not considered a deformity.
- A long neck is one that is more than one third the length of the horse. Long necks are common, especially in Thoroughbreds, Saddlebreds, and Gaited Horses. A long neck may hinder the balancing ability of the horse, and the horse may fatigue more quickly as a result of the greater weight on its front end. The muscles of a long neck are more difficult to develop in size and strength. A long neck needs broad withers to support its weight. It is easier for a long necked horse to fall into the bend of an S-curve than to come through the bridle, which causes the horse to fall onto its inside shoulder. This makes it difficult for the rider to straighten. A horse with this trait is best used for jumping, speed sports without quick changes of direction, or for straight line riding such as trail riding.

=== Neck arch and musculature ===
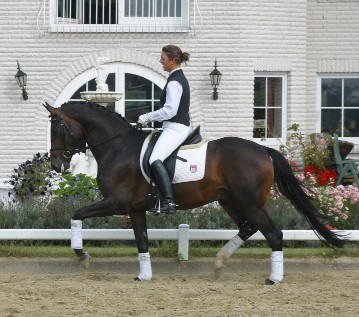
A nicely arched neck

- A neck with an ideal arch is called an arched neck or turned-over neck. The crest is convex or arched with proportional development of all muscles. The line of the neck flows into that of the back, making for a good appearance and an efficient lever for maneuvering. The strength of the neck with proportional development of all muscles improves the swing of shoulder, elevates the shoulder and body, and aids the horse in engaging its hindquarters through activation of the back. An arched neck is desirable in a horse for any sport.

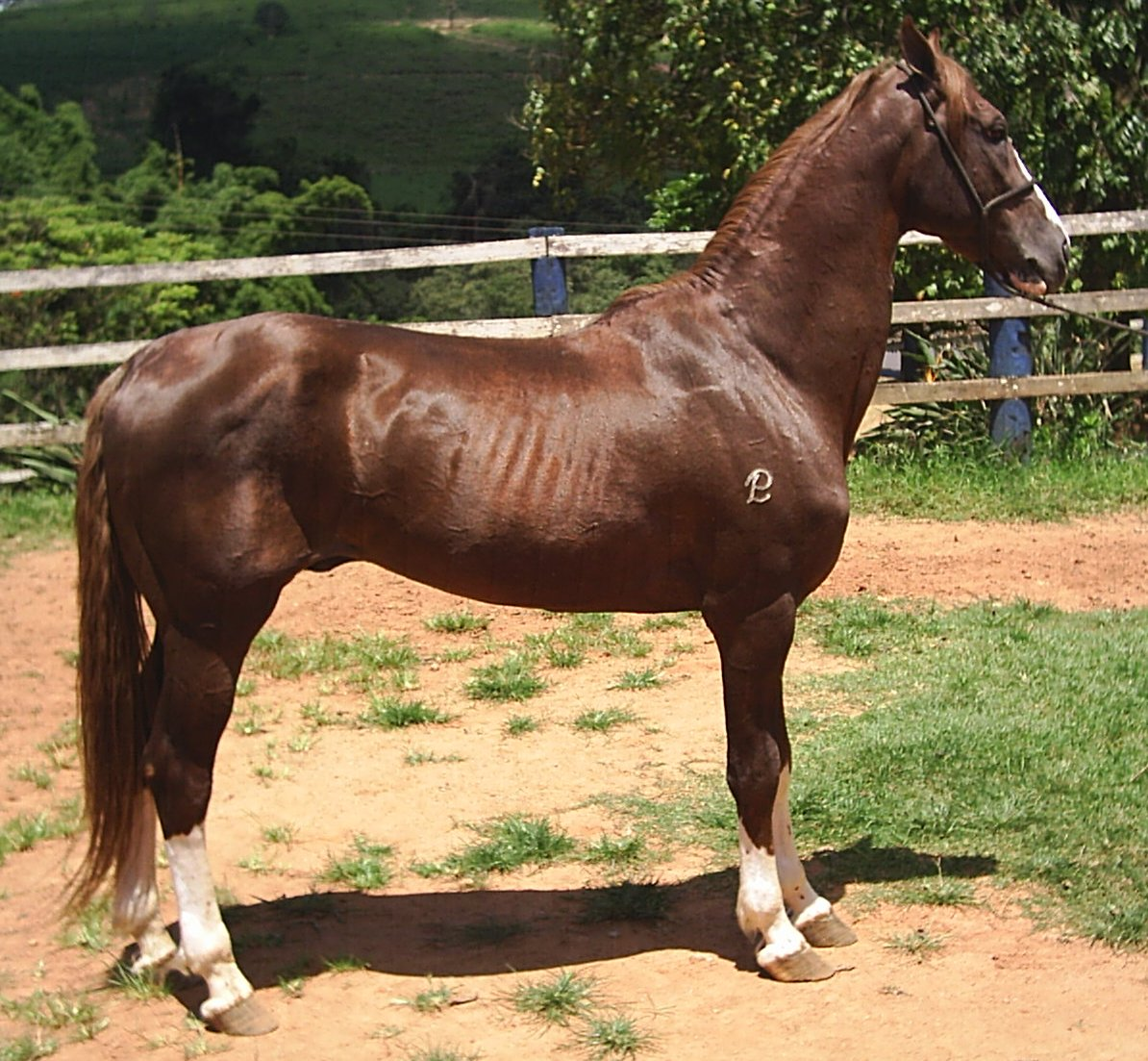
Ewe-neck, with muscling on the underside

- A ewe neck or upside-down neck bends upward instead of down in the normal arch. This fault is common and seen in any breed, especially in long-necked horses but mainly in the Arabian Horse and Thoroughbred. The fault may be caused by a horse who holds his neck high (stargazing). Stargazing makes it difficult for a rider to control the horse, who then braces on the bit and is hard-mouthed. A ewe neck is counter-productive to collection and proper transitions, as the horse only elevates its head and does not engage its hind end. The horse's loins and back may become sore. The sunken crest often fills if the horse is ridden correctly into its bridle. However, the horse's performance will be limited until proper muscling is developed.
- A swan neck is set at a high upward angle, with the upper curve arched, yet a dip remains in front of the withers and the muscles bulge on the underside. This is common, especially in Saddlebreds, Gaited horses, and Thoroughbreds. A swan neck makes it easy for a horse to lean on the bit and curl behind without lifting its back. It is often caused by incorrect work or false collection.
- A knife neck is a long, skinny neck with poor muscular development on both the top and bottom. It has the appearance of a straight crest without much substance below. A knife neck is relatively common in older horses of any breed. It is sometimes seen in young, green horses. It is usually associated with poor development of back, neck, abdominal and haunch muscles, allowing a horse to go in a strung-out frame with no collection and on its forehand. It is often rider-induced, and usually indicates lack of athletic ability. Knife neck can be improved through skillful riding and the careful use of side reins to develop more muscle and stability. A knife necked horse is best used for light pleasure riding until its strength is developed.

=== Crest ===
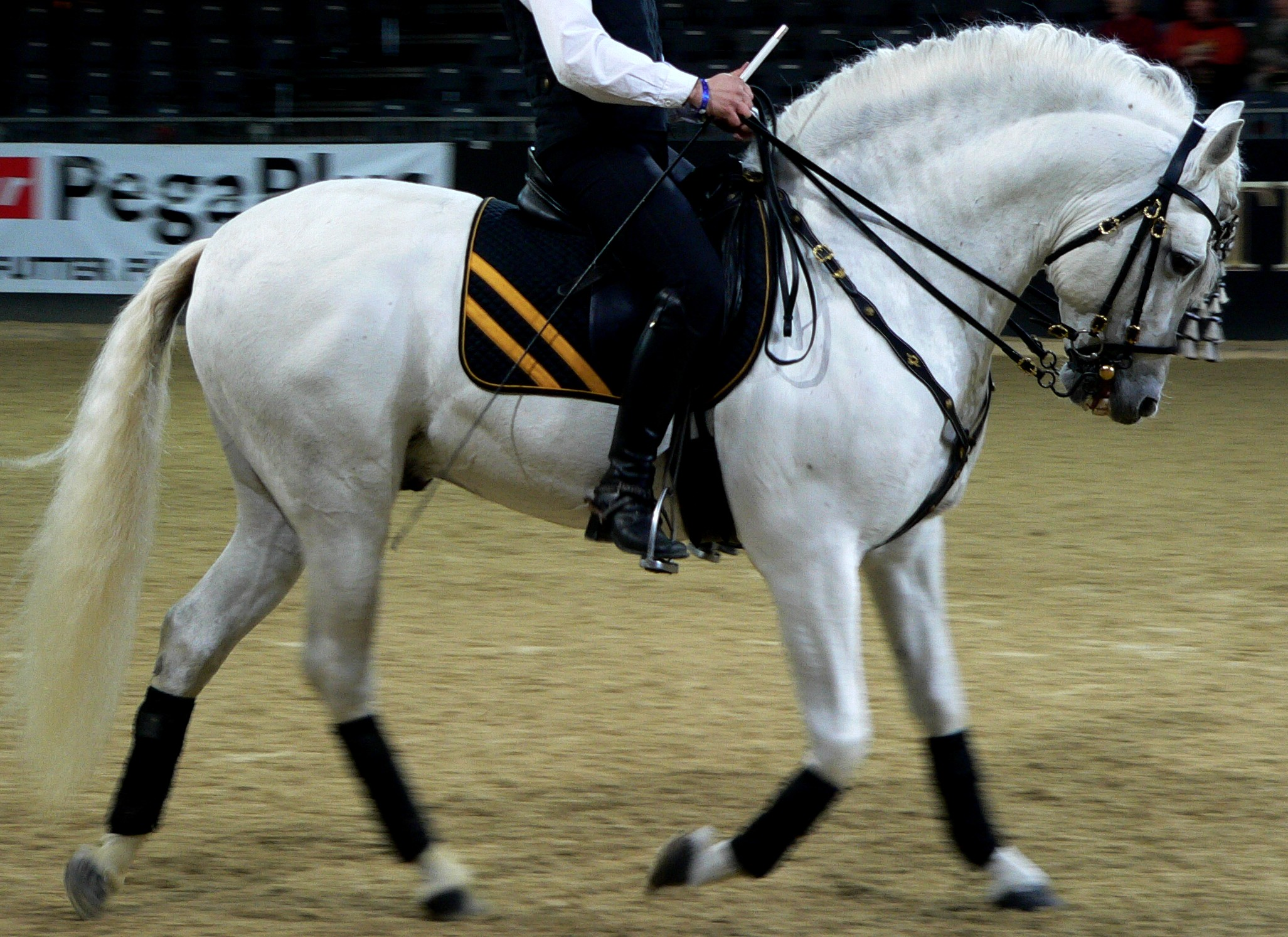
Large crest

- A large crest can be found in any breed. It is most often seen in stallions, ponies, Iberian breeds and draft breeds. There is often a link to the animal being an easy keeper. An excessively large crest puts more weight on the forehand, and is associated with insulin resistance. Crest enlargement is caused by fat deposits above the nuchal ligament. In most horses, the crest can be reduced with a controlled diet.

== Shoulder, forearm, and chest ==
The horse's shoulder includes the shoulder blade and the upper arm. Its angle and length influence stride length, smoothness of movement, and the ability to absorb concussion. A shoulder may be described as upright or sloping. A sloping shoulder allows for a longer, smoother stride and better shock absorption, where horses may move with more reach and may be more comfortable to ride. An upright shoulder tends to shorten the stride and increase concussion on the front legs. Horses with upright shoulders may have higher knee action and a less elastic gait.

The upper arm (humerus) connects the point of shoulder to the elbow. Its length and angle affect how freely the horse can move the foreleg. An upper arm that is somewhat shorter than the shoulder blade, and forms an open angle with it, allows good reach and freedom of movement. A short upper arm can restrict the stride and make the horse appear to move with a shorter, choppier action. A very long upper arm may place the forelegs farther under the body, which can limit the forward swing of the leg.

The elbow is the joint at the back of the upper arm. The elbow should point straight back and sit close to the body without being tight against it, allowing the foreleg to move straight and freely. Turned‑in elbows may cause the toes to turn out, and turned‑out elbows may cause the toes to turn in and can produce paddling or winging.

The forearm runs from the elbow to the knee and contains the major muscles that extend and flex the foreleg. An ideal forearm is long, well‑muscled, and aligned straight with the knee and cannon bone. A long forearm is often associated with a longer stride and more efficient movement. A short forearm can shorten the stride and increase knee action.

The chest (usually viewed from the front) is formed by the ribs, breastbone, and shoulder region. Its width and shape influence lung capacity, stamina, and the placement of the forelegs. The chest should be well defined, with enough width between the shoulders to allow lung expansion and straight movement of the forelegs. A narrow chest may place the forelegs too close together, increasing the chance of one leg interfering with the other. A wide chest may set the forelegs farther apart, which can reduce agility.

Well‑sprung ribs, also called rounded ribs, provide good room for the lungs and are often associated with endurance. Slab‑sided ribs, also called flat ribs, reduce internal space and may be linked with lower stamina.

A narrow breast, where the space between the front legs is narrow, may be related to limited muscular development or certain body types and can increase the likelihood of interference. A pigeon breast is where the breastbone protrudes, and the forelegs sit farther back under the body, can restrict the forward swing of the shoulders and may produce a rolling gait.

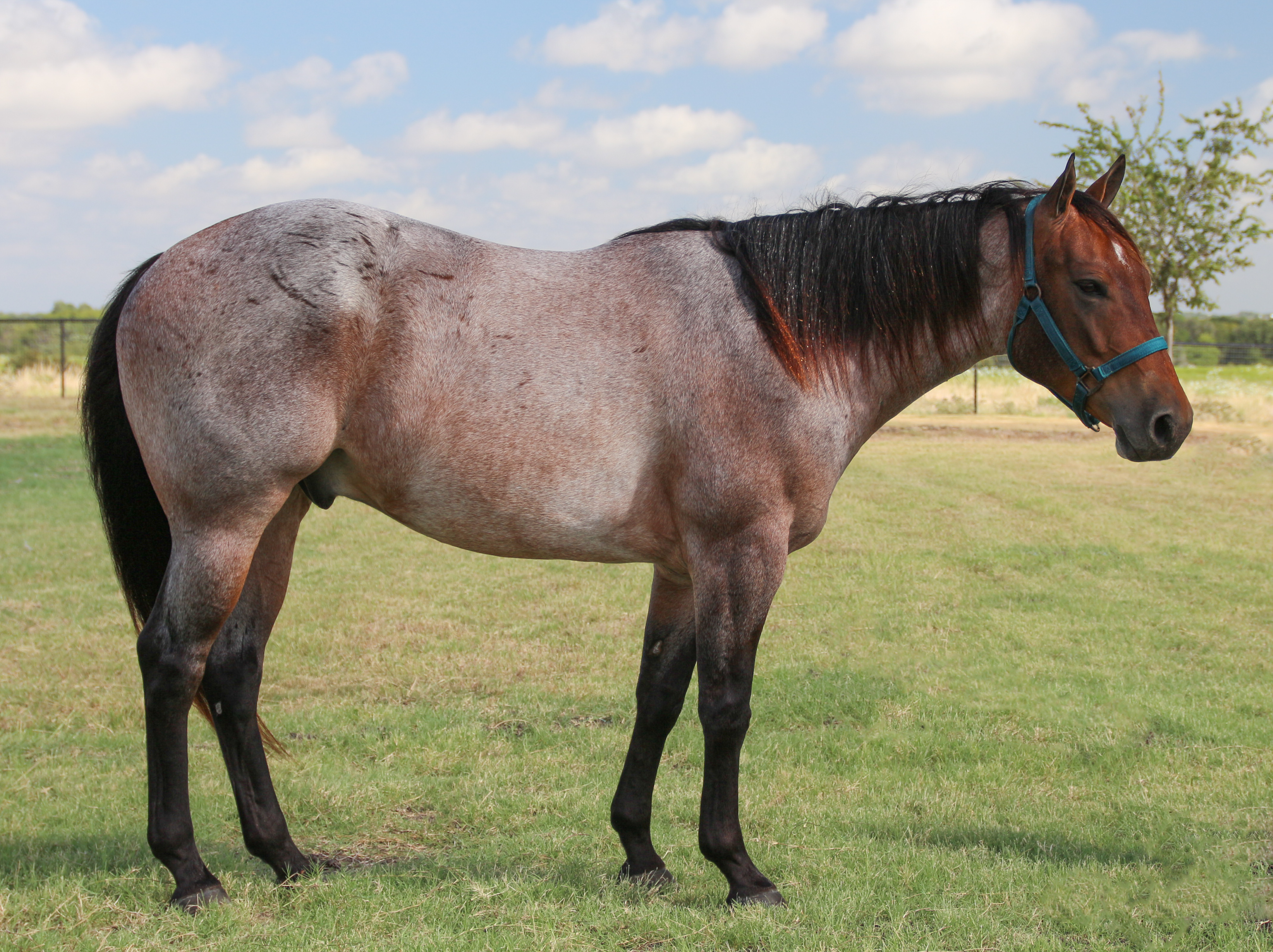
Upright shoulder

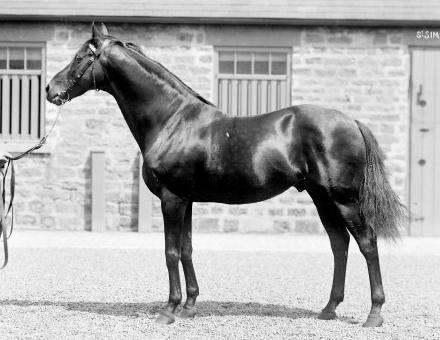
Sloping shoulder

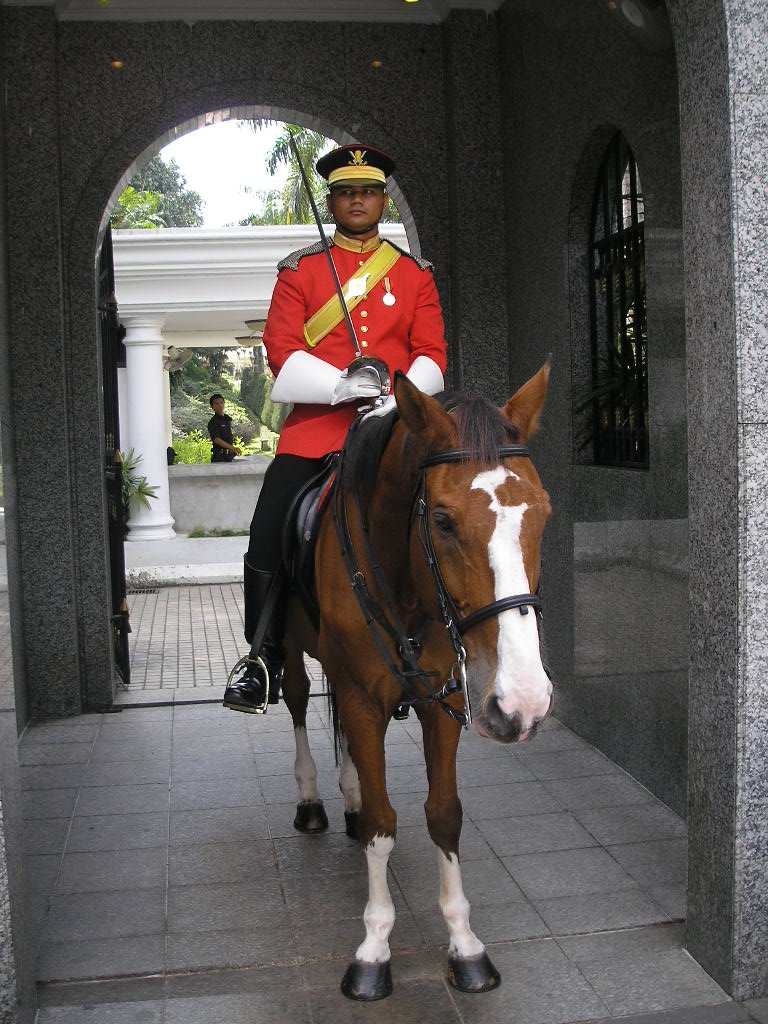
Narrow chest

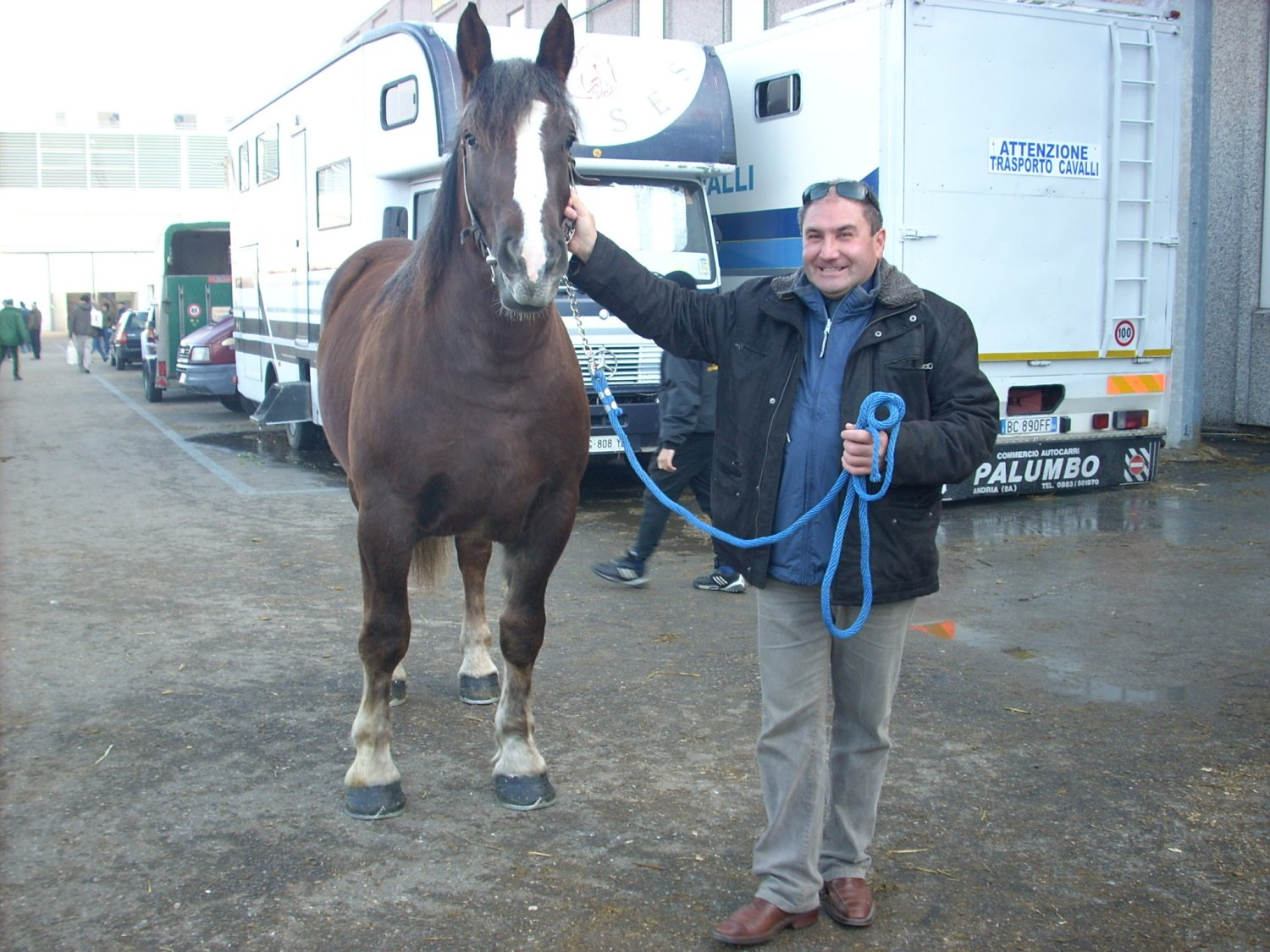
Wide chest

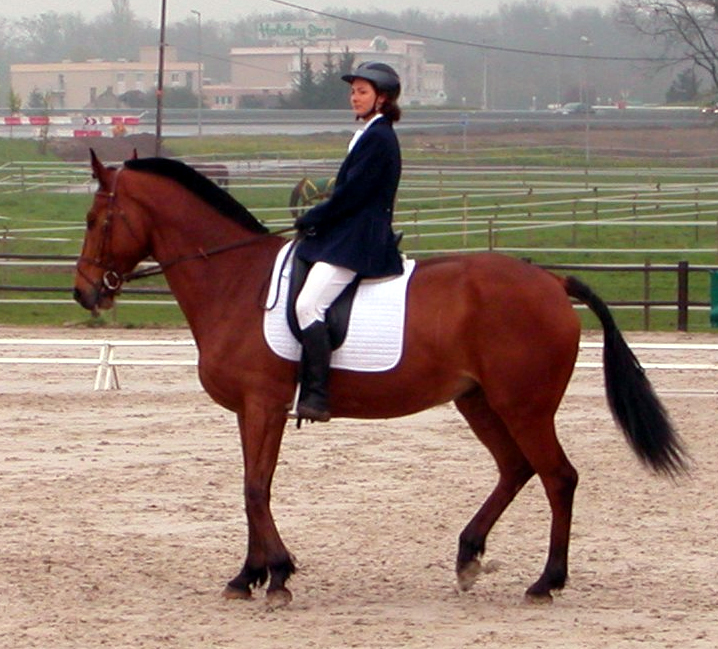
Pigeon-breast

== Body ==
=== Withers ===
The withers are the boney projection at the base of the neck and are the highest point of a horse's back. They are formed by the long spines of the thoracic vertebrae and serve as an important anchor point for the muscles and ligaments of the neck, back, and shoulders. Horse height is measured from the ground to the highest point of the withers, traditionally measured in hands (one hand equals 4 inches), or in centimeters in countries that use the metric system. High withers are tall and well defined. They allow good engagement of the back and shoulders and are common in lighter riding breeds, however very high or narrow withers may be prone to saddle pressure if the saddle does not fit well. Flat withers accompanied by muscling beside the withers is called mutton-withers, and makes it difficult for a saddle to stay in place. A horse whose withers are higher than the croup is said to be built uphill, and when the withers are lower than the croup the horse is said to be built downhill or have low withers.

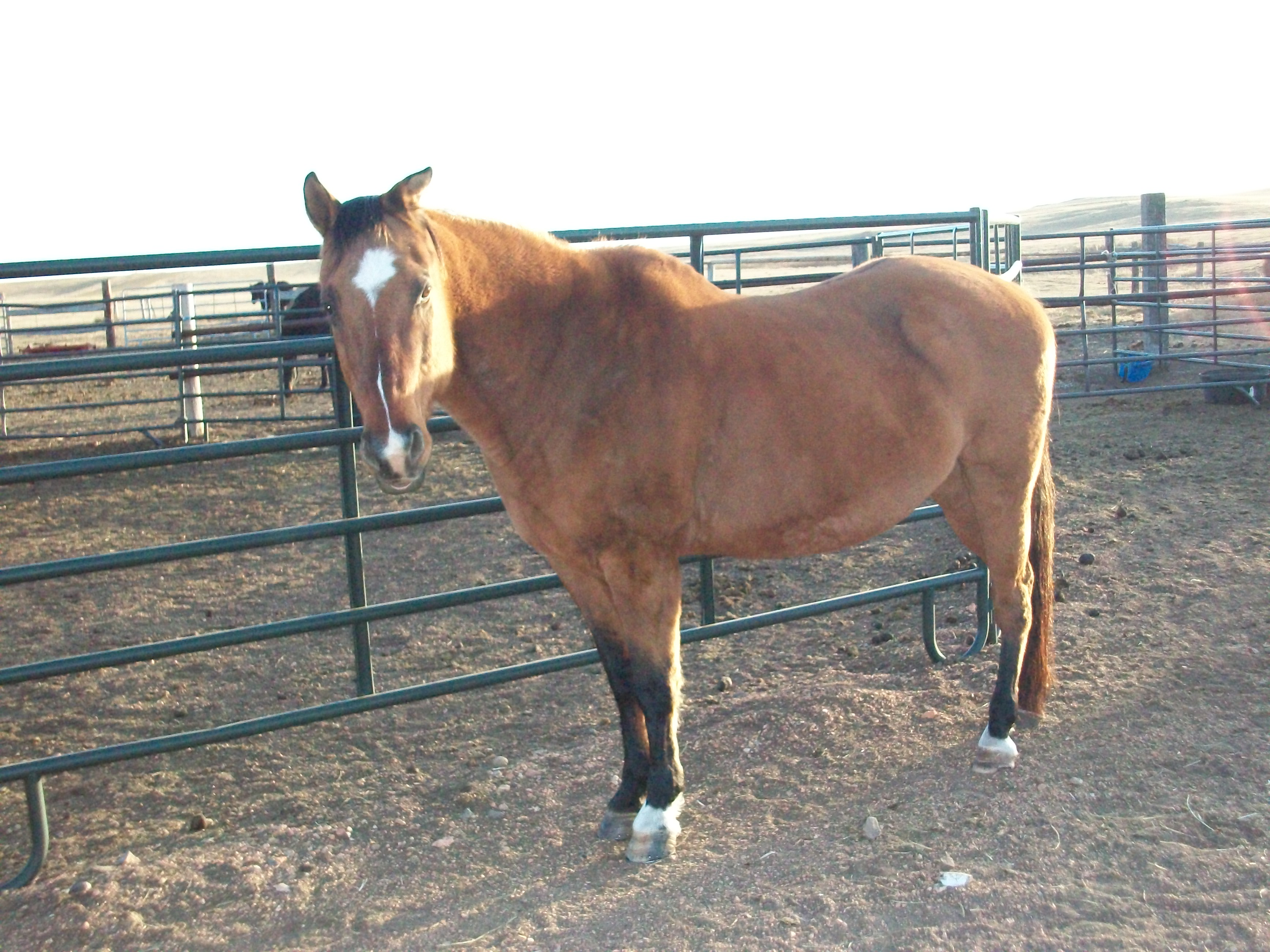
High withers

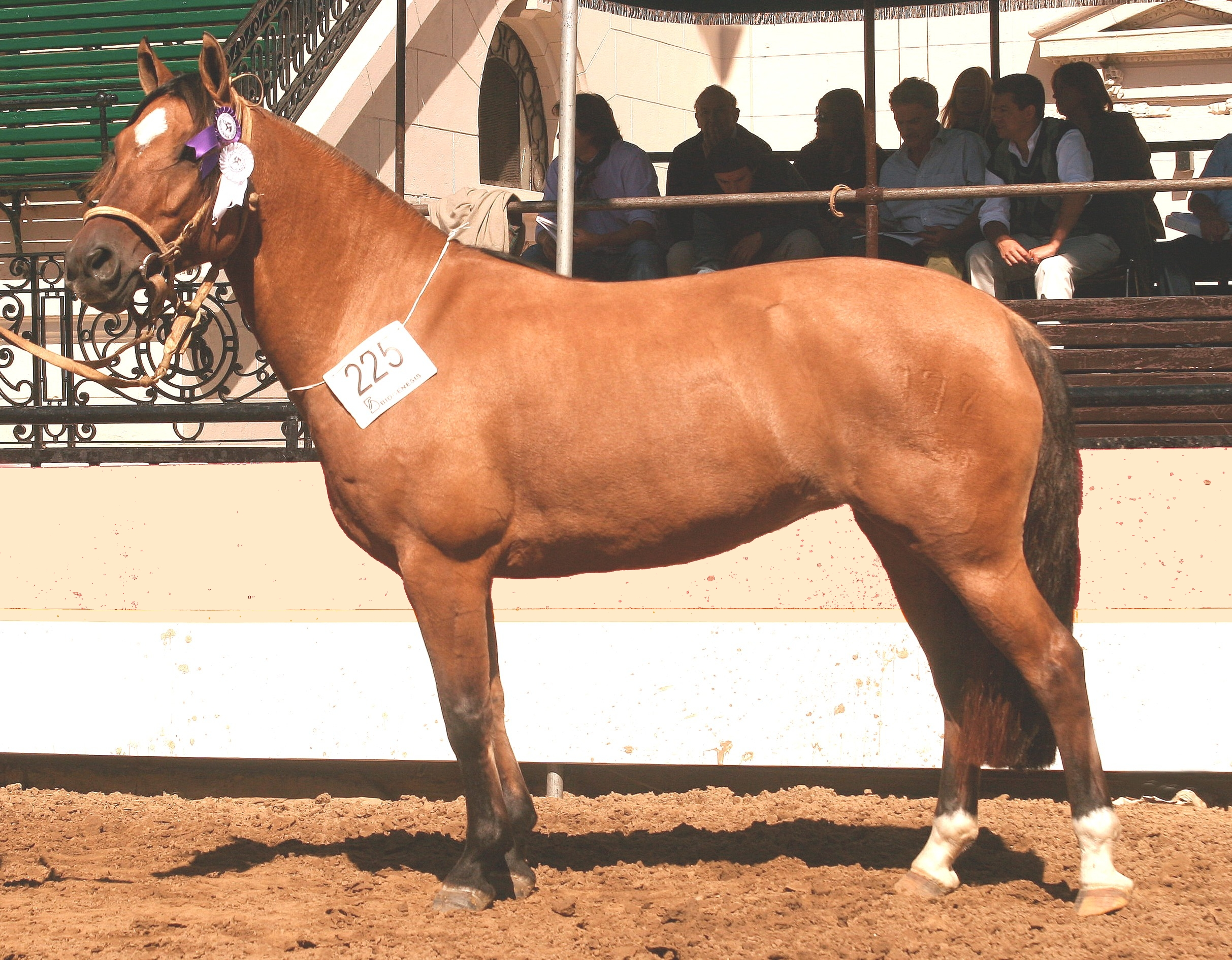
Mutton withers

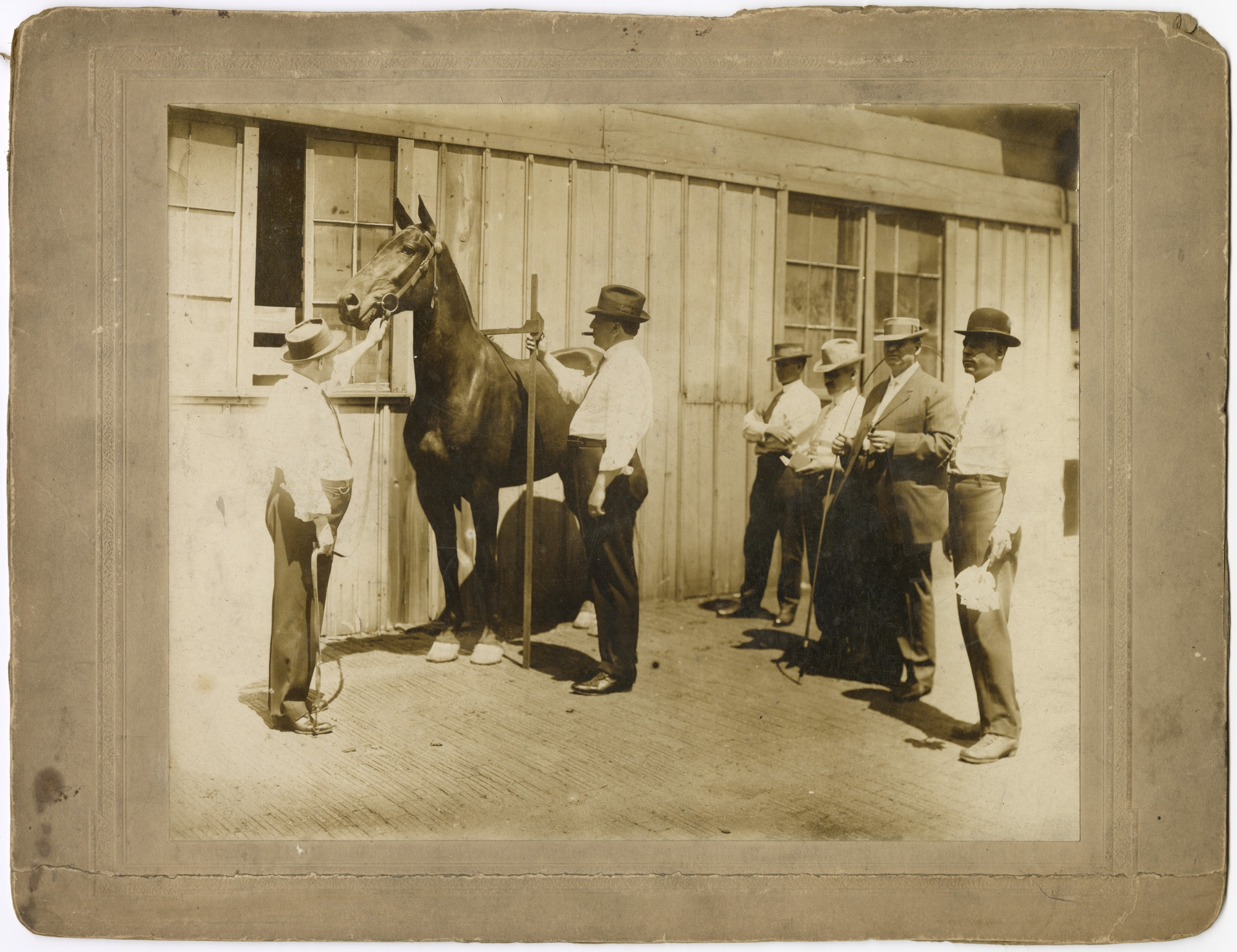
Measuring a horse

=== Back ===
The back is the region between the peak of the withers and the peak of the croup, covering the thoracic vertebrae that support the saddle and the lumbar vertebrae that connect the back to the hindquarters. The back's length, strength, and ability to flex play a role in how a horse moves, carries a rider, and performs athletic work. A short back is less than one-third of body length. It increases agility and quick direction changes, useful for polo, roping, cutting, and reining. However, it may lack flexibility and can become stiff, sometimes leading to spinal arthritis or an inelastic stride. With good muscling, short-backed horses generally carry riders well with fewer back issues. A long back exceeds one-third of the horse's body length. It is flexible but harder to stiffen, making collection and hindquarter engagement difficult, and reducing performance in jumping, dressage, cutting, reining, and polo. Long-backed horses fatigue more easily, are more prone to soreness and swayback. A sway back is a serious fault, showing a noticeable dip between withers and croup. It can be caused by weakened ligaments, old age, multiple pregnancies, poor conditioning, or overuse. Sway back can also be congenital.

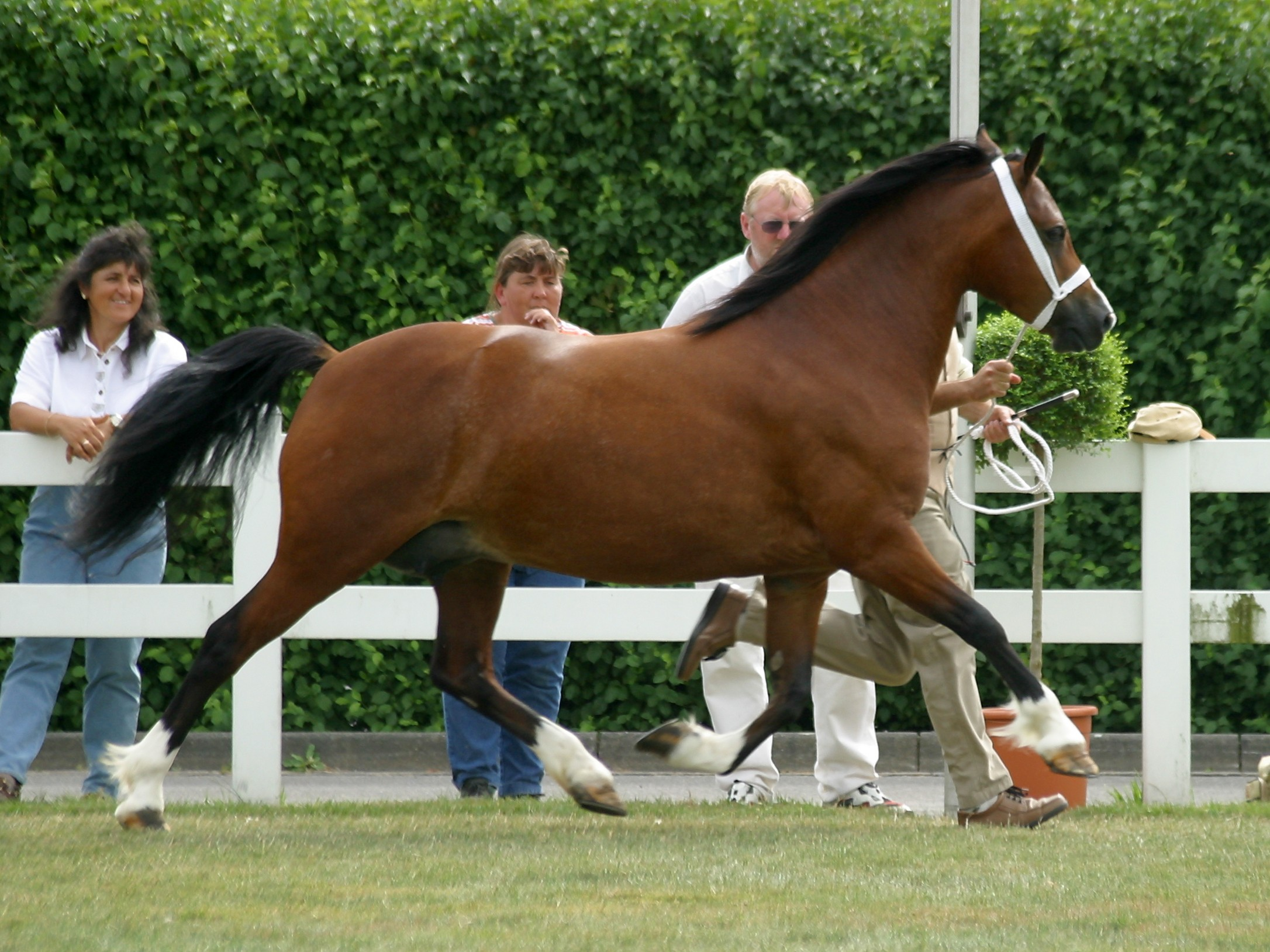
Short back

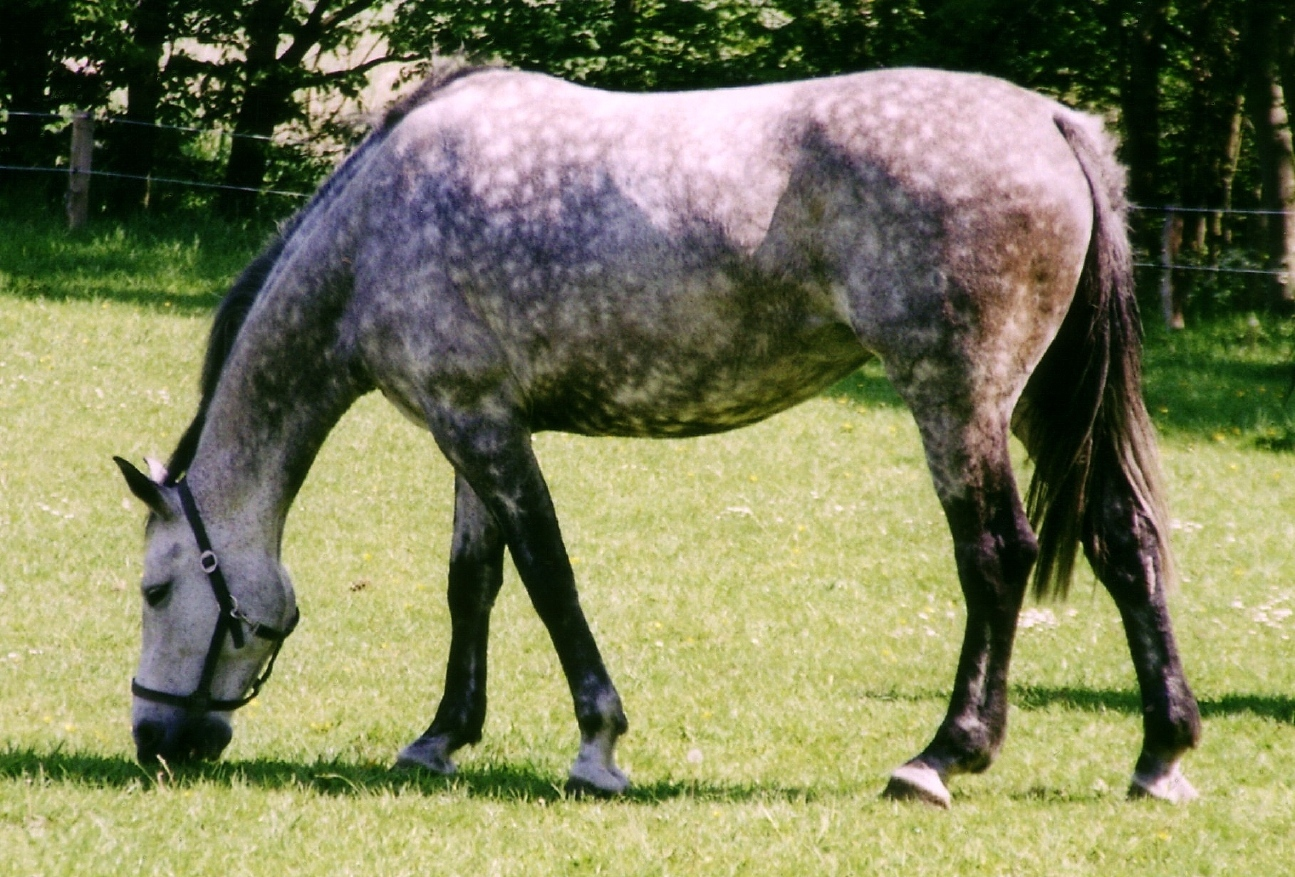
A slightly long back

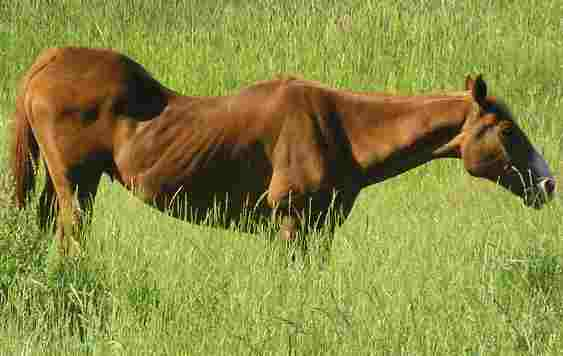
A sway back

=== Loin and coupling ===
Roached back

- In the area where the back and loins join the croup (the coupling) there is an upward convex curvature of the spine. Often a result of a short back, or injury or malalignment of the lumbar vertebrae.
- Often accompanied by less-developed loin muscles in breadth, substance, and strength. The spine already "fixed" in a curved position, and the attaching muscles are unable to contract properly to round or elevate the back. Thus it is difficult to engage the hindquarters or round the back by elevating loin muscles. Vertebrae often have reduced motion so the horse takes shorter steps behind.
- Jumping and dressage especially are affected.
- The horse is stiffer through the back and less flexible in an up and down motion as well as side to side.
- There may be back pain from vertebral impingement.
- There is a less elastic feel beneath rider as the back too rigid. Agility sports (polo, cutting, reining, barrel racing, gymkhana) are more difficult.
- Common fault

Long or weak loins/weak coupling

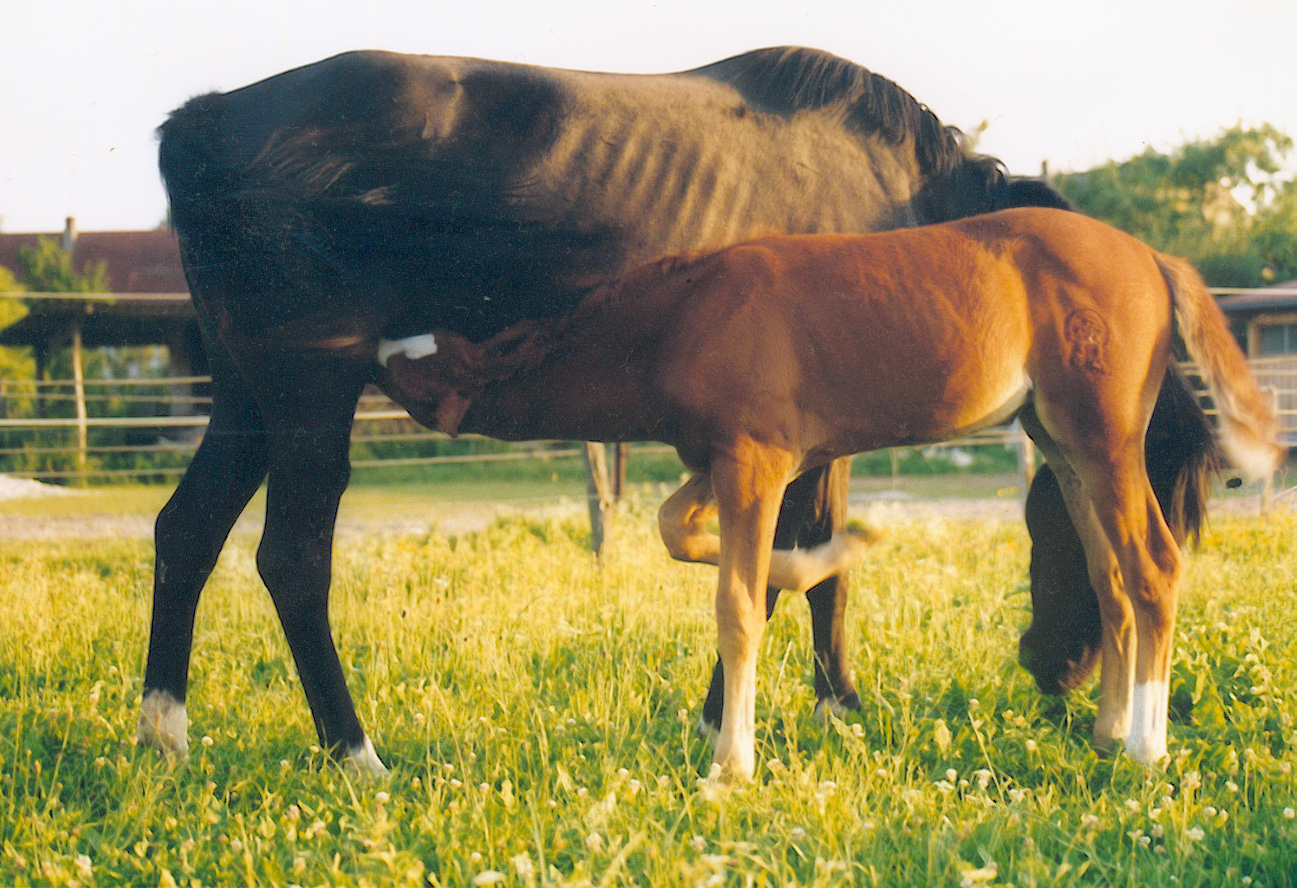
The mare in the picture has both a "widows peak" and long loins.

- Coupling is the joining of back at the lumbosacral joint. Ideally, the L-S joint should be directly over the point of hip. Weak coupling is where the L-S joint is further to the rear. The loin is the area formed from last rib to point of hip. The loin is measured from the last rib to the point of hip, and it should be one to one and a half hands width. Long loins are associated with a long back. The croup is often relatively flat and the quarters are high.
- Horse with weak or slack loin might have good lateral bend, but collection suffers as true collection depends on coiling loin to bend the hind legs. Because the hind legs and hocks are not able to be positioned under body, the hind legs string out behind, so the horse is more likely to go on the forehand. This creates coordination and balance problems, as well as forelimb lameness.
- The horse needs the hind legs under for jumping, and for going up and down hill. A weak loin inhibit's this, especially affecting eventing, jumping, and trail horses.
- The loin regulates the distribution of weight on the forehand by allowing the horse to elevate its back and distribute its weight to the hind end. Horses unable to coil the loins move with stiff backs and a flattened L-S joint, throwing the rear legs out behind. This limits the ability of dressage horses, and also affect reining, cutting, and polo horses as they are unable to explode with thrust.
- Long-coupling is associated with a long back and short hindquarters. This will limit collection is any discipline.

Short coupling

- Also known as close coupled.
- Associated with a short back, which will enable high thrust and collection.

Rough coupling/widow's peak

- In the loin, the horse has a hollow area considerably lower than foremost part of the croup.
- Fairly uncommon, and does not affect the horse's use in sport.
- Cosmetically displeasing. Muscling of the loin may be ample and strong with minimal effect on ability to collect back or push with haunches. However, if a horse does not have a strong loin, it will have difficulty in raising the back for engagement.

=== Croup and "hip" ===
The croup is from the lumbosacral joint to the tail. The "hip" refers to the line running from the ilium (point of the hip) to the ischium (point of the buttock)of the pelvis. After the point that is made by the sacrum and lumbar vertebrae, the line following is referred to as the croup. While the two are linked in terms of length and musculature, the angle of the hip and croup do not necessarily correlate. But it is desirable for a horse to have a square to slightly pear shaped rump. A horse can have a relatively flat croup and a well-angled hip. Racehorses do well with hip angles of 20–30 degrees, trotting horses with 35 degrees. Once a horse is developed, the croup should be approximately the same height as the withers. In some breeds a high croup is hereditary trait.

Steep Croup or Goose Rump

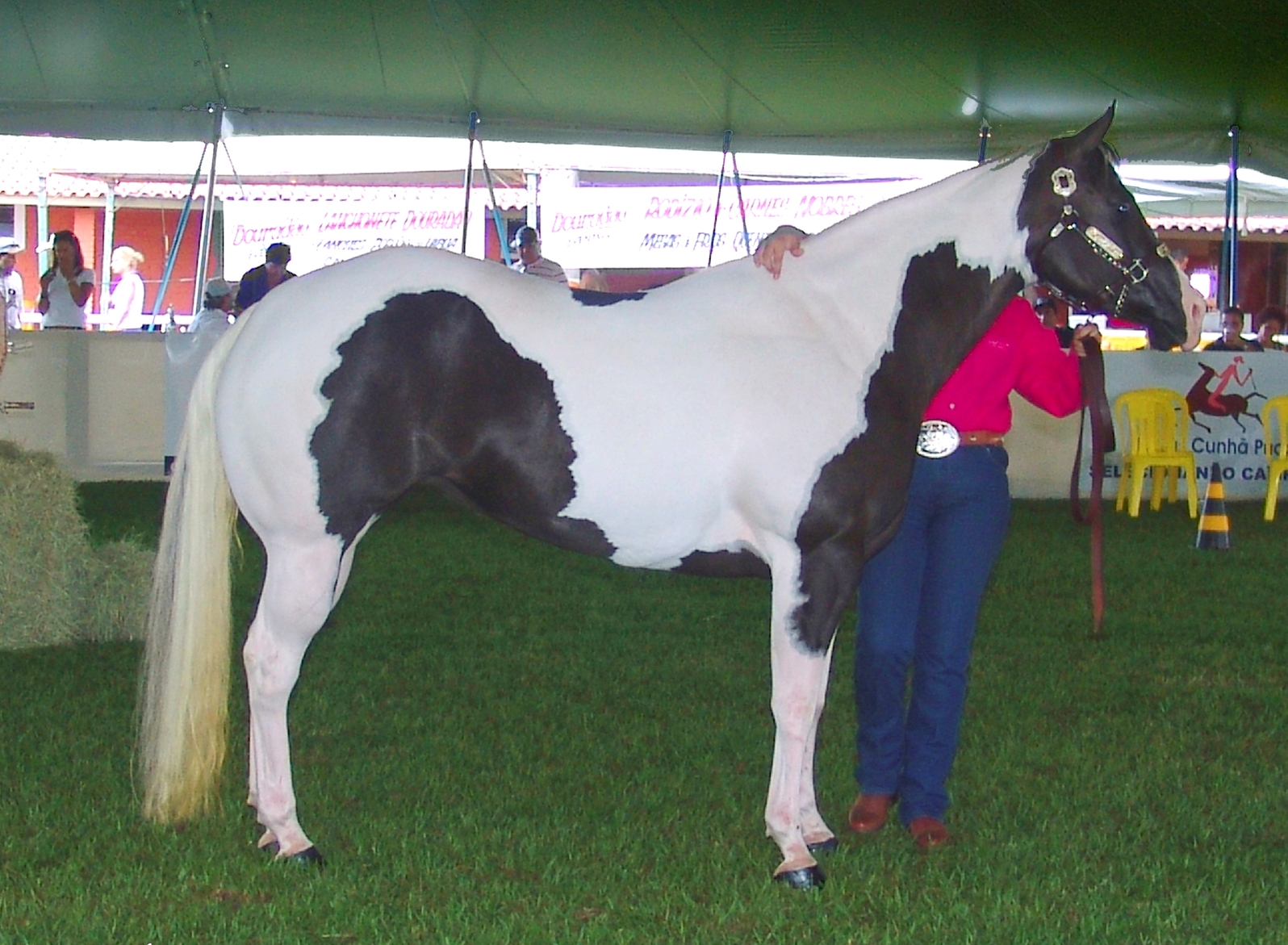
Steep croup but fairly long "hip"

- A steep croup is often linked to shortened stride
- Less of a fault for slow-moving horses such as draft breeds than for light riding horses
- Some breeds prefer a steep croup on their horses. Quarter horses in particular.

Flat or Horizontal Croup

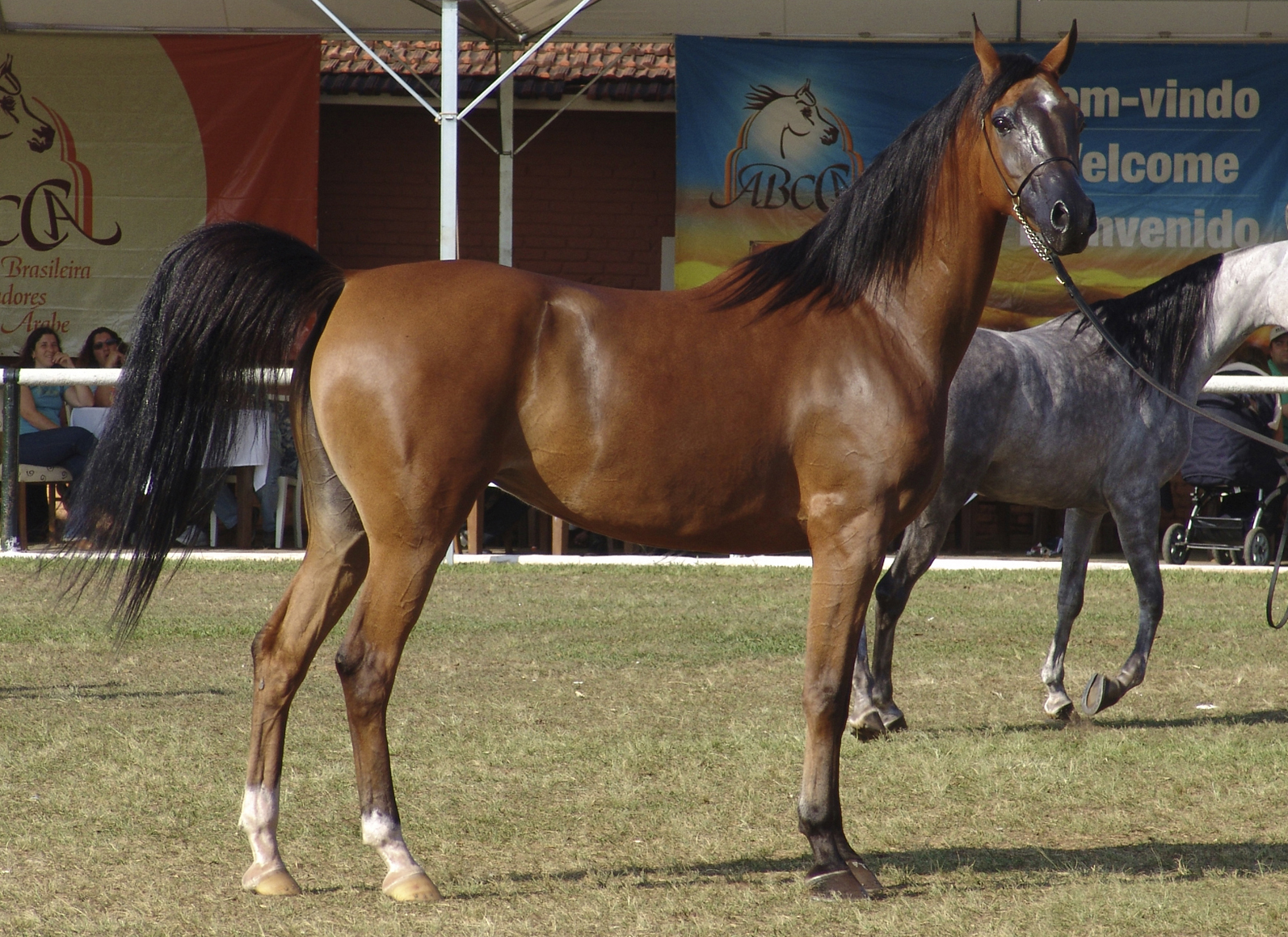
Flat croup

- The topline continues in a relatively flat manner to the dock of tail rather than falling off at oblique angle at the hips.
- Seen especially in Saddlebreds, Arabians, and Gaited horses
- Encourages a long, flowing stride. This helps a horse go faster, especially when a flat croup is sufficiently long to allow a greater range of muscle contraction to move the bony levers of skeleton.

Short croup

- Length from L-S joint to dock of the tail is insufficient for adequate muscular attachment
- Reduces power of hindquarters
- Usually seen in conjunction with multiple hind leg faults

Short "hip"

- The L-S joint is often behind the point of hips. Insufficient length from point of hip to point of buttock
- Horse will have difficulty collecting.
- A well-muscled build may hide a short pelvis.
- Provides less length of muscular attachments to the thigh and gaskin. This diminishes engine power in speed or jumping events.
- Short hip is less effective as a muscular lever for collection and to contract the abdominal muscles as the back rounds. More muscular effort is required.

Flat "hip"

- Flat pelvis, line from point of hip to point of buttock flat and not properly angled, result is pelvis structure too long. L-S joint often tipped, ischium improperly placed.
- It is more difficult to engage the hindquarters, so the back tends to stiffen. Thus it is hard to excel in dressage, jumping, stock horse work. Minimizes the ability to develop power at slower paces needed by draft horses.

Jumper's Bump (also known as Hunter's or Racking Bump)

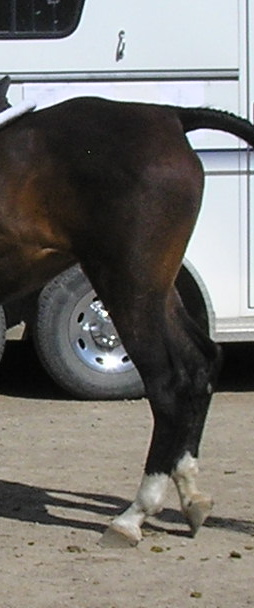
A "jumper's bump"

- The horse has an enlargement at the top of the croup, or a malalignment of the croup with the pelvis and lumbar vertebrae, caused by the tearing of a ligament at the top of the croup. One or both sides of L-S joint may be affected.
- Fairly common, usually seen in jumping horses and in horses that rack in an inverted frame.
- It is a torn ligament caused by excessive hindquarter effort, or from a horse that had the hindquarters slip out underneath or trotted up a very steep hill. Usually does not cause problems once healed, although it is easier to re-injure.
- Usually associated with horses with weak loins or a long back that is unable to coil loins properly for collection. Commonly caused by overpacing young horses, a rider allowing a horse to jump while strung out, or by racking (or other gaiting) in a very inverted frame.

=== Tail ===
High Tail Set

- Tail comes out of body on a level with the top of the back.
- Commonly seen in Arabians, Saddlebreds, Morgans, and Gaited horses.
- There is no direct performance consequence. Often, although not always, it is associated with a flat croup. A high-set tail contributes to the appearance of a horizontal croup, which may be an aesthetic concern to some.
- Gives as animated appearance, which is good for parade, showing, or driving

Low Tail Set

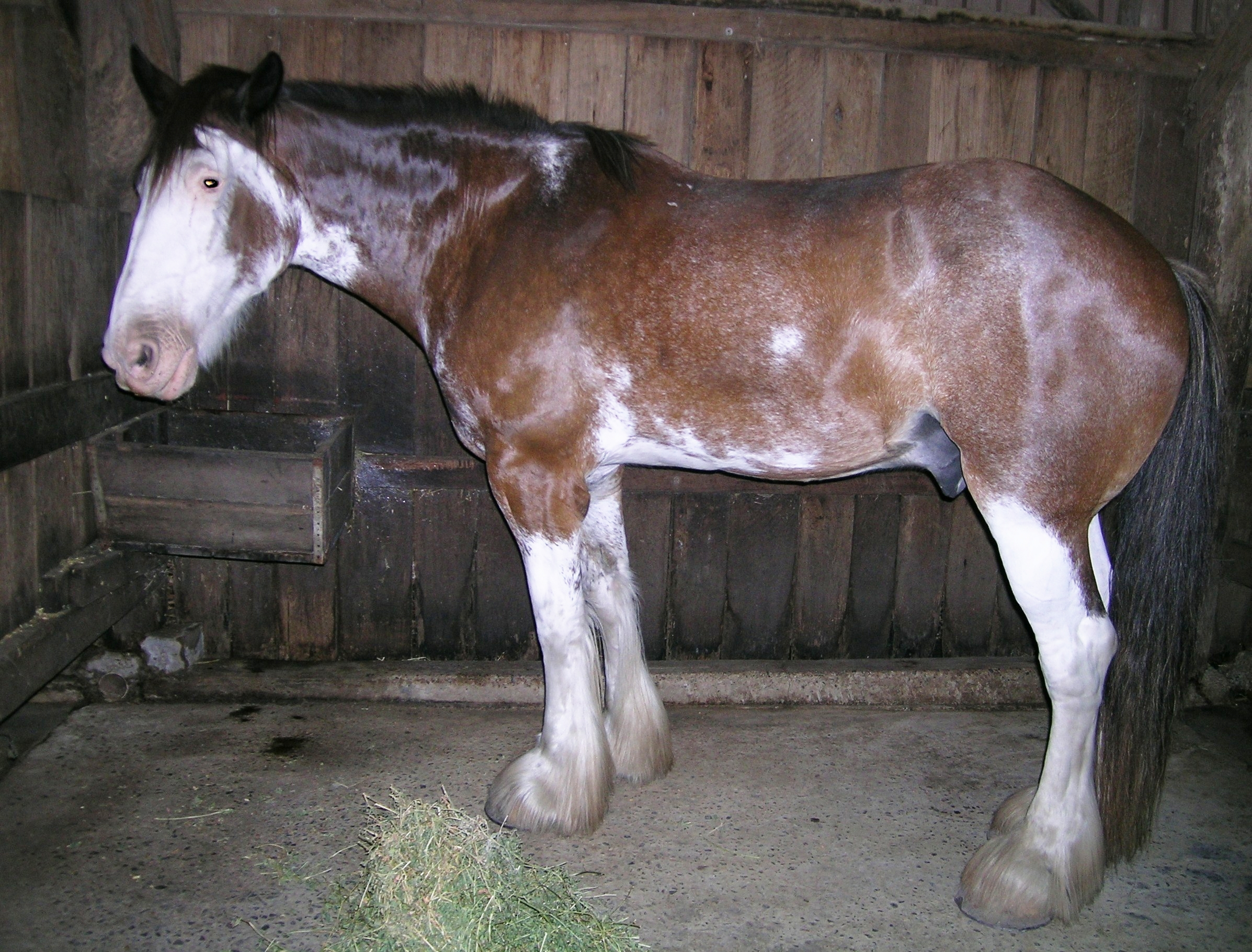
A very low set tail

- Tail comes out of the body well down along the haunches. Associated with goose-rumped or steep pelvis.
- Seen in any breed, especially in draft breeds
- Only aesthetic concern unless directly caused by pelvic conformation.

Wry Tail/ Tail Carried to One Side

- The tail is carried cocked to one side rather than parallel to the spine
- May be hereditary
- May be linked to spinal misalignment, possibly due to injury
- May be because the horse is not straight between the rider's aids, can be used to determine how straight a horse is traveling behind. Over time, incorrect body carriage may place undue stress on limbs.
- May be from discomfort, irritation or injury

=== Ribcage and flanks ===
Wide Chest and Barrel/Rib Cage

- Rounded ribs increase the dimensions of the chest, creating rounded, cylindrical or barrel shape to the rib cage. Length of the ribs tends to be short.
- Seen in any breed, especially American Quarter Horses, and some Warmbloods
- Provides ample room for the expansion of the lungs.
- Too much roundness increases the size of the barrel, may restrict upper arm movement, the length of stride, and thus speed. Round ribs with a short rib length further restrict the shoulder.
- Pushes the rider's legs further to the side of the body, and can be uncomfortable, especially in sports that require long hours in saddle or that require sensitive leg aids (dressage, cutting, reining).

Pear-Shaped Ribcage/Widens Toward Flank

- The horse is narrow at and behind the girth at midchest, then widens toward the flank
- Common, especially in Arabians, Saddlebreds, and Gaited horses
- Makes it difficult to hold the saddle in place without a breastplate or crupper, especially on uneven terrain, jumping, or low crouch work with quick changes of direction (cutting). When saddle continually shifts, the rider's balance is affected, and the horse and rider must make constant adjustments. Saddle slippage has the potential to create friction and rubs on back or cause sore back muscles.
- Horse is best used in sports on level terrain and for non-jumping activities

Well-Sprung Ribs

- Ribs angle backward with sufficient length, breadth, and spacing with arched rib cage and deep chest from front to back. Largest part of the barrel is just behind the girth area. Last rib is sprung outward and inclined to the rear, with the other ribs similar in length, roundness, and rearward direction.
- Desirable for any sport.
- Promotes strong air intake, improving performance and muscular efficiency
- Ample area of attachment of shoulder, leg and neck muscles, enabling a large range of motion for muscular contraction and speed of stride.
- The rider's weight is easily balanced and stabilized since the saddle stays steady and the rider can maintain close contact on horse's side with leg.
- There is sufficient room for developing strong loin muscles while still having short loin distance between last rib and point of hip (close coupling).

Slab-Sided

- Poor spring of the ribs due to flatness and vertical alignment of the ribs. Ribs are adequate in length.
- Common, especially in Thoroughbreds, Saddlebreds, Tennessee Walkers, and Gaited horses
- There is less room for the lungs to expand, limiting the efficiency of muscular metabolism with prolonged, arduous exercise
- If there is a short depth in the chest, the horse will have a limited lung capacity which is likely to limit the horse's ability for speed work
- Horse generally has lateral flexibility.
- Narrowness makes it difficult for the rider to apply aids since the legs often hangs down without fully closing on the horse. More effort needed to stay on horse's back because of limited leg contact and the saddle tends to shift.
- Horse has a harder time carrying the rider's weight because of reduced base of support by narrow back muscles.

Tucked Up/Herring-Gutted/Wasp-Waisted

- Waist beneath the flanks is angular, narrow, and tucked up with a limited development of abdominal muscles. Often associated with short rear ribs, or undernourished horses.
- Seen in any breed
- Often a result of how horse is trained and ridden. If a horse does not use its back to engage, they never develop their abdominal muscles. Appears to be like a lean runner (greyhoundish), with stringy muscles on topline and gaskin.
- Lack of abdominal development reduces overall strength of movement. Stamina is reduced, and the back is predisposed to injury. The horse is incapable of fluid, elastic stride, but is probably capable of ground-cover despite correct body carriage.
- Speed and jumping sports should be avoided until the muscles are developed.

Good Depth of Back

- The depth of the back is the vertical distance from lowest point of back to bottom of abdomen. Point in front of sheath or udder should be parallel to the ground and comparable in depth to front portion of chest just behind the elbow at the girth.
- Seen in any breed, especially Warmbloods, Quarter Horses, and Morgans.
- Good depth indicates strong abdominal muscles, which are important for strength and speed. Critical to dressage, jumping, and racing. Strong abdominals go with a strong back, which is suitable for carrying a rider's weight and engaging the haunches.
- Should not be confused with an obese horse in "show" condition, as fat just conceals wasp-waistedness.

== Hindquarters and hips ==
The Hindquarters

Short Hindquarters

- Measured from the point of hip to the point of buttock, the hindquarters should be ideally at least 30% of length of overall horse. Anything less is considered short. Most horses are between 29 and 33%; 33% is typically "Ideal," Thoroughbreds may have a length reaching 35%.
- Insufficient length minimizes the length of the muscles needed for powerful and rapid muscular contraction. Thus, its reduces speed over distance, stamina, sprint power, and staying ability.
- Tends to reduce the horse's ability to fully engage the hindquarters need for collection or to break in a sliding stop
- Horse is most suited for pleasure sports that do not require speed or power
- Often associated with too steep angles causing Goose Rump
- The point of croup is behind the point of hips, thus making a weaker loin and coupling
- May also cause horse to be sickle-hocked with the hind foot being too far under the body

Steep-Rumped

- Viewed form the side, the pelvis assumes a steep, downward slope.
- Uncommon, except in draft horses, but seen in some Warmbloods.
- A steep slant of the pelvis lowers the point of buttock bringing it closer to the ground & shortening the length of muscles from the point of buttock & the gaskin. Shortens the backward swing of the leg because of reduced extension & rotation of hip joint. A horse needs a good range of hip to get a good galloping speed and mechanical efficiency of hip and croup for power & thrust. Therefore, a goose-rumped horse is not good at flat racing or sprinting.
- Harder for a horse to "get under" and engage the hindquarters. Causes the loins and lower back to work harder, predisposing them to injury.
- A goose-rump is valuable in sports with rapid turns & spins (reining, cutting). The horse is able to generate power for short, slow steps (good for draft work).
- Horse is most suited for stock horse work, slow power events (draft in harness), low speed events (equitation, pleasure, trail)

Goose-Rumped

- Viewed from the side, the pelvis has a relatively flat, but sloping profile of adequate length, but the flatness does not extend to the dock of the tail as in a Flat-Crouped horse.
- The croup is exceptionally high and exhibits a sloping quarter and low tail connection, also with a sharp, sloping rump
- The pelvis is too far downward and too short
- Creates a low point of buttocks, making it closer to the ground, thus making the hindquarters less strong & inhibiting the stifle's movement
- Common in some Warmbloods and may be considered a desirable trait in some breeds.
- Often seen in Arabian breed due to the high tail placement; may exhibit levelness
- This conformation allows good engagement of the hindquarters, while giving the long stride and speed of Flat-Crouped conformation.
- A horse that is goose-rumped does not have enough swing and power in the hindlegs and would not be suitable for speed and endurance events
- Often associated with good jumping performance.
- Note that the term Goose-Rumped is sometimes used as a synonym for Steep-Rumped, potentially causing confusion, as the two conformations imply rather different qualities in the horse's performance.
- Horses with goose-rump also are more prone to hindquarter injuries
- Often associated with "Cat-Hammed" horses
- Does not severely affect draft breeds because of their short, slow steps

Cat-Hammed/Frog's Thighs

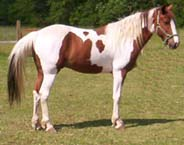
A cat-hammed horse

- The horse exhibits long, thin thighs and gaskins with insufficient muscling
- The horse has poor development in the hindquarters, especially the quadriceps and thighs. Associated with goosed-rumps & sickle hocks.
- Uncommon, most usually seen in Gaited horses. Can develop from years in confinement.
- The horse lacks the development needed for speed and power, so the horse is not fast or strong. Thus it is not advantageous for flat racing, polo, eventing, jumping, steeplechase, and harness racing.
- The horse's gait tends to be more ambling than driving at the trot, so the horse often develops a stiff torso & back, making the ride rigid.
- This fault can also be attributed to poor nutrition and conditioning

Thighs

- The thighs are the muscled area over the femur bone.
- The femur and tibia bones should be about the same lengths, thus allowing for more room for longer thigh muscles; this allows for greater speed and power and for a longer stride
- Thighs should be well-muscled, long and deep.
- The inner thighs should be full and give a square or oblong look to the hindquarters when viewed from the rear
- The back of the thighs or the "hams" should be thick enough that they touch each other until they split.

The Hips

Narrow Hips

- Viewed from the rear, the breadth between the hips is narrow.
- In horses with narrow hips, the pelvis is crowded and aligned improperly which puts more strain and stress on the joints of the legs
- Common, seen in any breed, although Quarter Horses tend not to have them. Usually in Thoroughbreds, Saddlebreds, Arabians, and Gaited horses.
- A narrow pelvis contributes to speed since the horse can get its hind legs well under its body to develop thrust.
- The narrow hip shape is partially dictated by exercise development of haunch muscles.
- Good width widens the breadth between stifles, hocks & lower legs to enable power, acceleration, & foot purchase into ground, preventing interference injuries. Narrow pelvis limits size of muscular attachments of hips, affecting strength & power.
- The horse is best suited for flat racing, trail, carriage driving; does not possess much driving power

Rafter Hips/Wide Hips

- Wide, flat hip shaped like a "T" when viewed from behind. Cattle tend to have this pelvis type to the extreme.
- The horse's legs are too far apart at the top and the feet are too close together; often exhibit base narrow stance (not straight from behind), thus exuding less amount of strength and placing more stress on the joints
- Uncommon, usually seen in Gaited horses, Saddlebreds, and Arabs.
- Rafter hips are often amplified by poor muscling along thighs and lower hips. Exercises to improve muscling helps the problem.
- Not desirable in a riding horse with fast gaits

One Hip Bone Lower/Knocked-Down Hip

- From behind, the point of hip on one side is lower than the other. May be due to an injury to the point of hip, or to subluxation or fracture of the pelvis.
- Uncommon
- Generally induced by a traumatic blow to hip. Not heritable.
- The gait symmetry is affected (which is bad for dressage or show horses). Interference with power and thrust may alter strength of jumping high fences or reduce speed.
- The horse may not be able to perform strenuous activities.
- Knocked-down hips interfere with speed and jumping.
- The horse is more prone to developing muscular or ligament soreness associated with re-injury or strain. This is especially likely to occur in a jumper, racer, steeplechaser, or eventer. However, in most cases the horse recovers completely, others will often still experience muscle soreness and will have to settle for only performing slow work.

High Stifles/ Short Hip

- Ideal hip forms equilateral triangle from point of buttock, point of hip, and stifle. A short hip has a short femur (thigh bone) that reduces the length of quadriceps and thigh muscles. The femur is short when the stifle seems high (sits above sheath in male horse)
- Found in any breed, but usually in racing Quarter Horses or Thoroughbreds.
- Effective in generating short, rapid, powerful strokes (sprint or draft work). The horse has a rapid thrust & thus rapid initiation of sprint speed.
- Ideally, the bones of the gaskin and femur should be of similar length in horse that does anything but sprint or draft work. A short femur reduces stride length behind & elasticity of stride that jumpers, dressage horses, and flat/harness racers want.

Low Stifle/ Long Hip

- A long hip is created by a long femur which drops the level of stifle to or below the sheath line on a male horse.
- Favorable in all sports except sprint sports and draft work
- Enables the horse to develop speed and power after it gets moving.
- The muscles of the hip, haunches, and thighs will be proportionately long with a long hipbone, giving the horse the capacity to develop speed and power over a sizeable distance. Produces ground-covering and efficient stride in all gaits.
- Good for eventing, steeplechase/timber, flat/harness racing, jumping, and long-distance riding

== Front and hind legs ==
The Cannon and Tendons

Long Cannon Bone

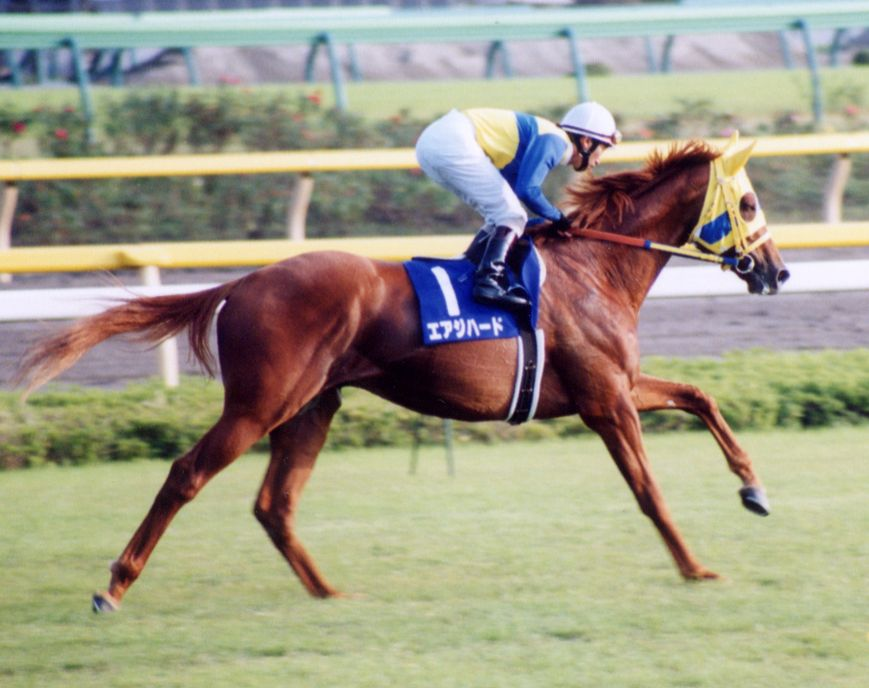
Long cannon bones

- The cannon is long between the knee and fetlock, making the knees appear high relative to the overall balance of the horse
- Reduces the muscular pull of the tendons on the lower leg.
- Uneven terrain or unlevel foot balance will magnify the stress on the carpus since lengthy tendons are not as stabilizing to the lower limb as shorter ones
- Increases the weight on the end of the limb, contributing to less efficient and less stable movement. Added weight to front legs increases the muscular effort needed in picking up a limb, leading to hastened fatigue.
- Increase in tendon/ligament injury, especially when the horse is also tied-in above the knee.
- Horses with long cannons are best for flat racing short distances.

Short Cannon Bone

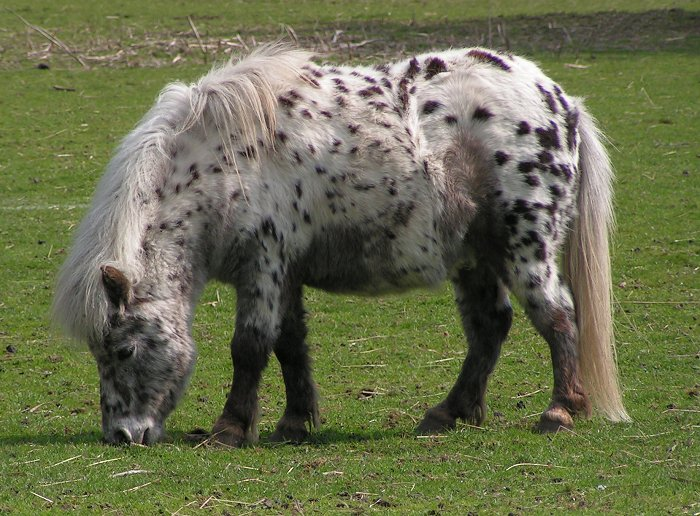
Short cannon bones

- Cannon is relatively short from fetlock to knee as compared to knee to elbow
- This conformation is desirable in any performance horse
- A short cannon bone improves the ease and power of the force generated by the muscles of a long forearm or gaskin. Enables an efficient pull of the tendons across the back of the knee or point of hock to move the limb forward and back.
- Also reduces the weight of the lower leg so less muscular effort is needed to move the limb, which contributes to speed, stamina, soundness, and jumping ability.

Rotated Cannon Bone

- The cannon rotates to the outside of the knee so it appears twisted in its axis relative to knee. May still be correct and straight in alignment of joint, but more often associated with appearance of carpus valgus.
- Places excess strain on the inside of the knee and lower joints of the leg, potentially leading to soundness issues, although this is not common.

Bench or Offset Knees/ Offset Cannons

- The cannons are set to the outside of the knee so an imaginary plumb line does not fall through middle.
- Causes excessive strain on the lateral surfaces of the joints from the knee down and on the outside portions of the hoof.
- There is an exaggerated amount of weight supported by the medial splint bone, leading to splints.
- The horse is most suited for non-speed activities like pleasure riding, driving, and equitation.

Tied-in Below the Knee

- The cannon, just below the knee, appears "cut out" with a decreased tendon diameter. Rather than parallel with cannon, tendons are narrower than the circumference measured just above the fetlock.
- Affects speed event (racing, polo) and concussion events (steeplechase, jumping, eventing, endurance).
- Limits the strength of the flexor tendons that are needed to absorb the concussion and diffusion of impact through the legs, making the horse more prone to tendon injuries, especially at the midpoint of the cannon or just above.
- The leverage of muscle pull is decreased as the tendons pull against the back of knee rather than a straight line down back of leg. This reduces power and speed.
- Associated with a reduced size in the accessory carpal bone on back of knee over which the tendons pass. The small joints are prone to injury and do not provide adequate support for the column of leg while under weight-bearing stress.
- Horse is most suited for sports that shift the animal's weight to the rear or that do not depend on perfect forelimb conformation (dressage, driving, cutting).

The Front Legs- The Knee

Medial Carpal Deviation/ Carpus Valgus/ Knock-Kneed

- One or both knees deviate inward toward each other, with the lower leg angles out, resulting in a toed-out stance. Occurs because of an unequal development of the growth plate of distal radius, with the outside growth plate growing faster than inside. The bottom of the forearm seems to incline inward.
- Any horse can inherit this, but it may also be acquired from imbalanced nutrition leading to developmental orthopedic disease (DOD) or a traumatic injury to growth plate.
- The horse is most suited for pleasure riding, low-impact, and low speed events * The medial supporting ligaments of the carpus will be under excess tension. May cause soundness problems in the carpals or supporting ligaments. Horse also tends to toe-out, causing those related problems.
- Some research is beginning to indicate that deviation of the front leg in this way will reduce the injuries to horses with sport use, especially racing, the research done in Thoroughbreds and Quarter Horses.

Bucked, Sprung, or Goat Knees/ Over at the Knee

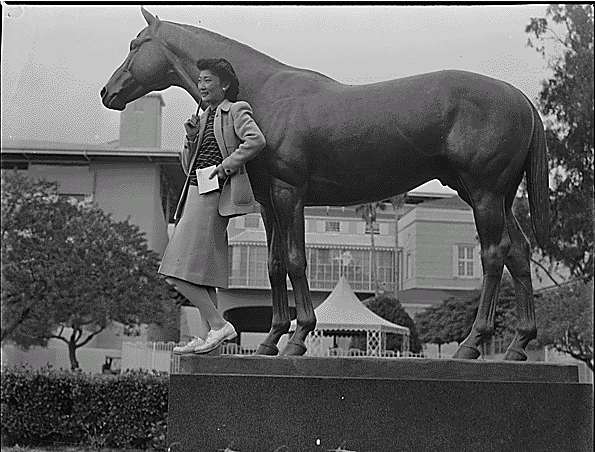
Even in his statue, Seabiscuit was visibly over at the knees

- Knee inclines forward, in front of a plumb line, when viewed from the side.
- Often a result of an injury to the check ligament or to the structures at the back of the knee. The column of the leg is weakened. Thus, the horse is apt to stumble and lose balance due to the reduced flexibility and from the knee joints that always are "sprung."
- If congenital, often associated with poor muscle development on the front of the forearms, which limits speed and power.
- More stress is applied to the tendons, increasing the risk of bowed tendons. The angle of attachment of the DDF and check ligament is increased, predisposing the check ligament to strain. Tendons and fetlock are in an increased tension at all times, so the horse is predisposed to injury to the suspensory (desmitis) and sesamoid bones. If the pasterns are more upright there is further stress.

Calf-Kneed/Back at the Knee

- The knee inclines backward, behind a straight plumb line dropped from the middle of the forearm to the fetlock.
- Usually leads to unsoundness in horses in speed sports. Places excess stress on the knee joint as it overextends at high speeds when loaded with weight. Backward angle causes compression fractures to the front surfaces of the carpals, and may cause ligament injury within knee. Worsens with muscle fatigue as the supporting muscles and ligaments lose their stabilizing function.
- Calf-knees weaken the mechanical efficiency of the forearm muscles as they pull across the back of the carpus, so a horse has less power and speed. The tendons and check ligament assume an excess load so the horse is at risk for strain. Often the carpals are small and can not diffuse the concussion of impact.
- The horse should have good shoeing, eliminating LTLH (long-toe, low-heel) syndrome.
- Sports that have more hindquarter function, like dressage, or slow moving activities like pleasure riding, are best for this horse.

The Front Legs- The Fetlock

Toed-Out/Lateral Deviation of Pastern from Fetlock/ Fetlock Valgus

- An angular limb deformity that creates a toed-out appearance from the fetlock down.
- A fairly common fault
- Creates excess strain on one side of the hoof, pastern and fetlock, predisposing the horse to DJD, ringbone, foot soreness or bruising.
- The horse will tend to wing, possibly causing an interference injury. May damage splint or cannon bone.
- This conformation diminishes the push from rear legs, as symmetry and timing of the striding is altered with the rotated foot placement, particularity at the trot. Thus, stride efficiency is affected to slow the horse's gait.
- The horse is unable to sustain years of hard work.

Toed-In/Medial Deviation of Pastern/Fetlock Varus

- An angular limb deformity causing a pigeon toed appearance from the fetlock down, with the toe pointing in toward the opposite limb.
- Horse is most suited for pleasure riding, non-impact, low-speed, and non-pivoting work.
- These horses tend to paddle, creating excess motion and twisting of the joints with the hoof in the air. This is unappealing in show horse, wasteful energy, which reduces the efficiency of the stride, so the horse fatigues more quickly. The hoof initially impacts ground on inside wall, causing excess stress on the inside structures of the limb, leading to ringbone (DJD) and sole or heel bruising in inside of hoof.

The Hindlegs

Short Gaskin/Hocks High

- Results from a relatively short tibia with a long cannon. Ideally, hocks are slightly higher than the knees, with the point of hock level with the chestnut of the front leg. Hocks will be noticeably higher in horse with this conformation. * The horse may have a downhill balance with the croup higher than the withers.
- See especially in Thoroughbreds, racing Quarter Horses, and Gaited horses.
- With this conformation, the horse can pull the hind legs further under the body, so there is a longer hind end stride, but the animal may not move in synchrony with the front. This will create an inefficient gait, as the hind end is forced to slow down to let the front end catch up, or the horse may take high steps behind, giving a flashy, stiff hock and stifle look. May cause forging or overreaching.
- Often results in sickle hock conformation.

Long Gaskin/Low Hocks

- Long tibia with short cannons. Creates an appearance of squatting.
- Usually seen in Thoroughbreds and stock horses.
- A long gaskin causes the hocks and lower legs to go behind the body in a camped-out position. The leg must sickle to get it under the body to develop thrust, causing those related problems.
- The long lever arm reduces muscle efficiency to drive the limb forward. This makes it hard to engage the hindquarters. The rear limbs may not track up and the horse may have a reduced rear stride length, forcing the horse to take short steps.
- The horse is best used for galloping events, sprinting sports with rapid takeoff for short distance, or draft events.

Hocks Too Small

- Hock appears small relative to the breadth and size of adjacent bones. Same principals with knees too small.
- The joints are a fulcrum which tendons and muscles pass over for power and speed, and large joints absorb concussion and diffuse the load of the horse. Small joints are prone to DJD from concussion and instability, especially in events where the horse works off its hocks a lot.
- A small hock does not have a long tuber calcis (point of hock) over which the tendons pass to make a fulcrum. This limits the mechanical advantage to propel the horse at speed. The breadth of the gaskin also depends on hock size, and will be smaller.

Cut Out Under the Hock

- Front of the cannon, where it joins the hock, seems small and weak compared to the hock joint. In the front end, it is called "tied in at knee."
- Mainly affects sports that depend on strong hocks (dressage, stock horse, jumping)
- Reduces the diameter of the hock and cannon, which weakens the strength and stability of the hocks. Means a hock is less able to support a twisting motion (pirouettes, roll backs, sudden stops, sudden turns). The horse is at greater risk for arthritis or injury in hock.

Camped Out Behind

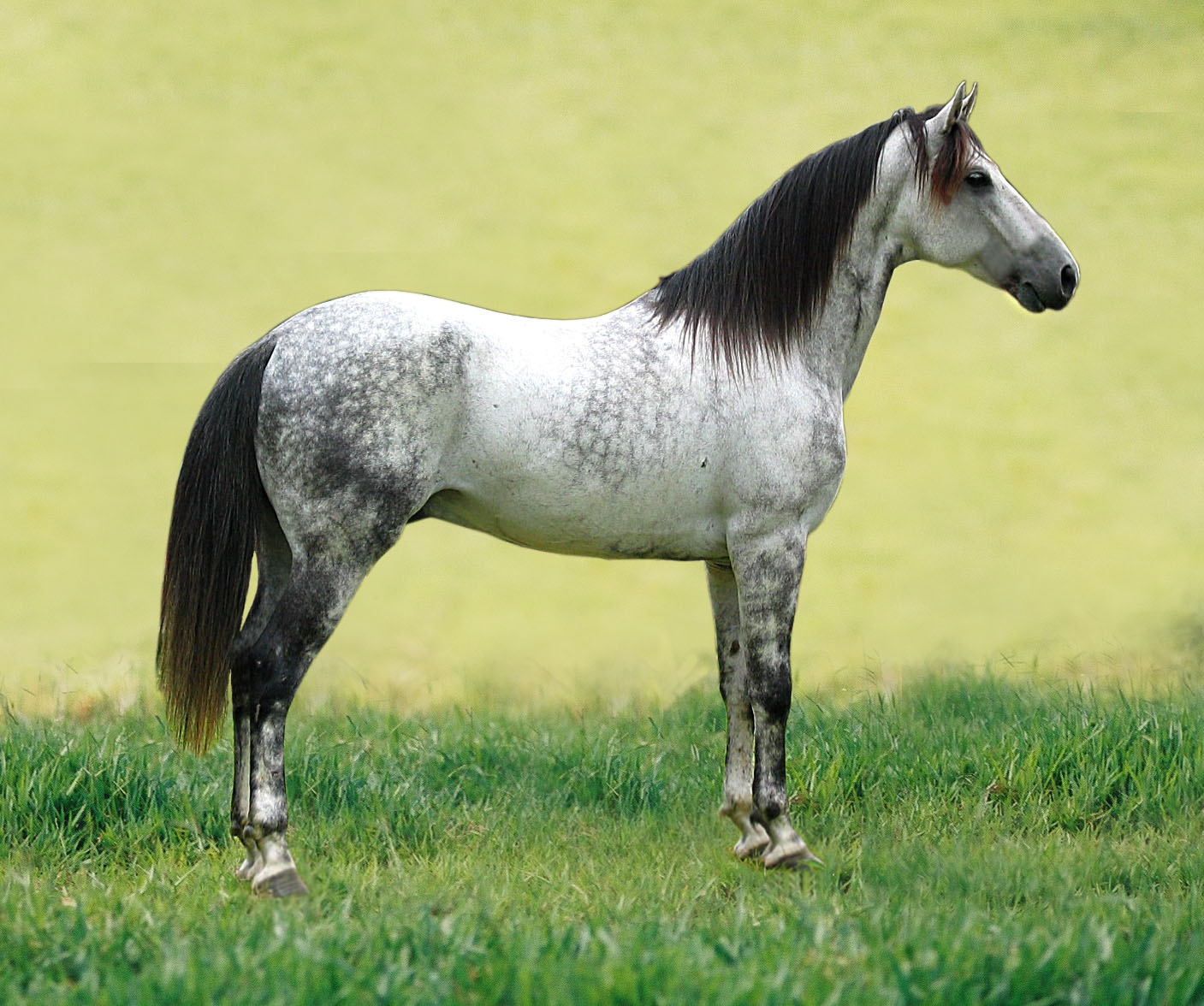
Slightly camped out behind

- Cannon and fetlock are "behind" the plumb line dropped from point of buttock. Associated with upright rear pasterns.
- Seen especially in Gaited horses, Morgans, and Thoroughbreds.
- Rear leg moves with greater swing before the hoof contacts the ground, which wastes energy, reduces stride efficiency, and increases osculation and vibrations felt in joints, tendons, ligaments, and hoof. May cause quarter cracks and arthritis.
- Difficult to bring the hocks and cannons under unless the horse makes a sickle hocked configuration. Thus, the trot is inhibited by long, overangulation of the legs and the horse trots with a flat stride with the legs strung out behind.
- It is difficult to engage the back or haunches, so it is hard to do upper level dressage movements, bascule over jumps, or gallop efficiently.

Sickle- or Sabre-Hocked/ Overangulated Long Hind Legs

- The hind leg slants forward, in front of the plumb line, when viewed from the side. The cannon is unable to be put in vertical position. Also called "curby" hock, as it is associated with soft tissue injury in the rear, lower part of the hock.
- Limits the straightening and backward extension of hocks, which this limits push-off, propulsion, and speed. There is overall more hock and stifle stress.
- Closed angulation and loading on the back of the hock predisposes the horse to bone and bog spavin, thoroughpin, and curb.

Post-Legged/Straight Behind

- Angles of the hock and stifle are open. The tibia is fairly vertical, rather than having a more normal 60 degree slope
- Common, usually seen in Thoroughbreds, steeplechasers, timber horses, eventers, and hunter/jumpers.
- In theory, sickle hocks facilitate forward and rearward reach as the hock opens and closes with a full range of motion without the hock bones impinging on one another. This led to selective breeding of speed horses with straight rear legs, especially long gaskins.
- The problem is that this breeding has been taken to the extreme. Tension on the hock irritates the joint capsule and cartilage, leading to bog and bone spavin. Restriction of the tarsal sheath while in motion leads to thoroughpin. A straight stifle limits the ligaments across the patella, predisposing the horse to upward fixation of the patella, with the stifle in a locked position, which interferes with performance and can lead to arthritis of the stifle.
- It is difficult for the horse to use its lower back, reducing the power and swing of the leg.
- Rapid thrust of the rear limbs causes the feet to stab into the ground, leading to bruises and quarter cracks.

Bow-Legged/Wobbly Hocks

- Hocks deviate from each other to fall outside of plumb line, dropped from point of buttocks, when the horse is viewed from behind.
- Most commonly seen in Quarter Horses with a bulldog stance.
- Hoof swings in as the horse picks up its hocks and then rotates out, predisposing the animal to interference and causing excess stress on lateral hock structures, predisposing the horse to bog and bone spavin, and thoroughpin.
- The twisting motion of the hocks causes a screwing motion on the hoof as it hits the ground, leading to bruises, corns, quarter cracks, and ringbone.
- The horse does not reach forward as well with the hind legs because of the twisting motion of the hocks once lifted, and the legs may not clear the abdomen if the stifles are directed more forward than normal. This reduces efficiency for speed and power.

Cow Hocks/Medial Deviation of the Hocks/Tarsus Valgus

- Hocks deviate toward each other, with the cannon and fetlock to the outside of the hocks when the horse is viewed from the side. Gives the appearance of a half-moon contour from the stifle to hoof. Often accompanied by sickle hocks.
- Fairly common, usually seen in draft breeds.
- Disadvantages to trotting horses, harness racers, jumpers, speed events, and stock horses.
- Many times Arabians, Trakehners, and horses of Arabian descent are thought to have cow hocks. But really the fetlocks are in alignment beneath the hocks, so they're not true cow hocks.
- A slight inward turning of hocks is not considered a defect and should have no effect.
- A horse with a very round barrel will be forced to turn the stifles more out, giving a cow-hocked appearance
- Medial deviation in true cow hocks causes strain on the inside of the hock joint, predisposing the horse to bone spavin. Abnormal twisting of pastern and cannon predisposes fetlocks to injury.
- More weight is carried on medial part of hoof, so it is more likely to cause bruising, quarter cracks, and corns. The lower legs twist beneath the hocks, causing interfering.
- The horse develops relatively weak thrust, so speed usually suffers.

== Pasterns ==
The angle of the pasterns is best at a moderate slope (between 50 and 55 degrees) and moderate length.

Pasterns Long and Sloping

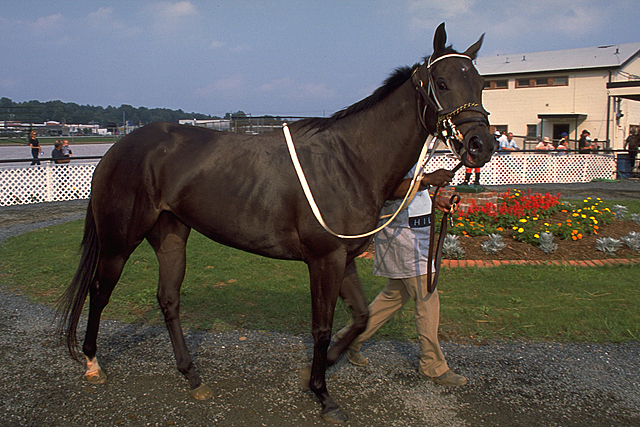
Long, sloping pasterns on a Thoroughbred

- The pasterns are long (more than 3/4 length of cannon) relative to rest of leg.
- This defect affects long-distance and speed sports
- Long pasterns have been favored because they can diffuse impact, giving a more comfortable ride. However, excess length puts extreme tension on the tendons and ligaments of the back of the leg, predisposing the horse to a bowed tendon or suspensory ligament injury. The suspensory is strained because fetlock is unable to straighten as horse loads the limb with weight.
- The pasterns are weak and unable to stabilize fetlock drop, so the horse is predisposed to ankle injuries, especially in speed events where the sesamoids are under extreme pressure from the pull of the suspensory. This can cause sesamoid fractures & breakdown injuries.
- May be associated with high or low ringbone. Increased drop of fetlock causes more stress on pastern and coffin joints, setting up conditions for arthritis.
- There is a delay time to get the feet off the ground to accelerate, and thus long pasterns make the horse poor for speed events.
- The horse is best for pleasuring riding, equitation, and dressage

Pasterns Short and Upright

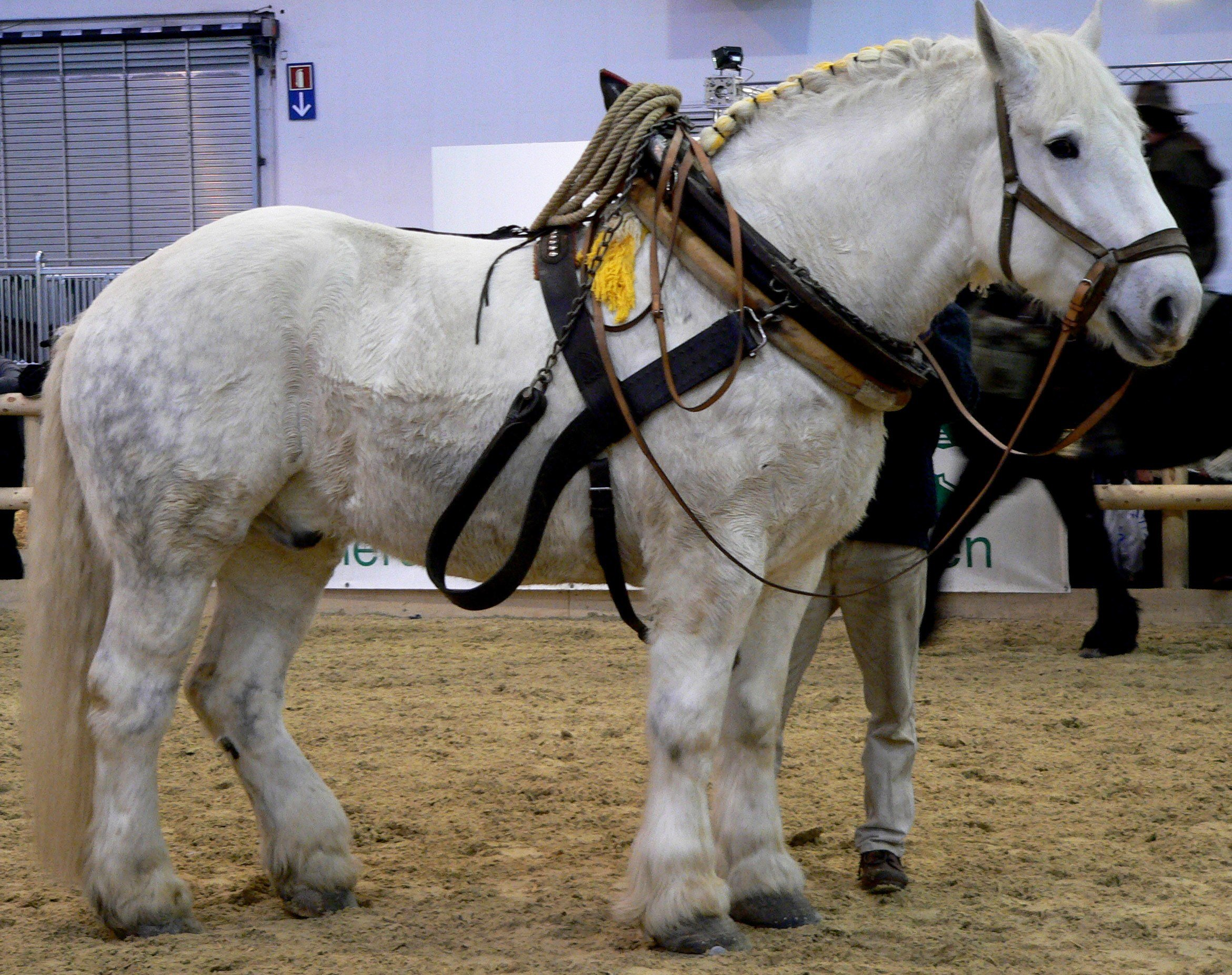
Short, upright pasterns

- A horse's pasterns are short if they are less than 1/2 length of cannon. The pasterns are upright if they are angled more toward the vertical. A long, upright pastern has the same performance consequences as short and upright.
- Most commonly seen in Quarter Horses, Paints, and Warmbloods
- The horse is capable of rapid acceleration, but is restricted to a short stride. They excel in sprint sports. The short stride is a result of both a short pastern and upright shoulder, creating a short, choppy stride with minimal elasticity and limited speed.
- Short pasterns have less shock-absorption, leading to more a jarring ride and amplified stress on the lower leg. The concussion is felt over the navicular apparatus, so the horse is more at risk for navicular disease, high or low ringbone, and sidebone. Also windpuffs and windgalls occur from chronic irritation within fetlock or flexor tendon sheath.
- The horse has reduced mechanical efficiency for lifting and breaking over the toe, so it may trip or stumble.
- The horse is best for sprint sports like Quarter Horse racing, barrel racing, roping, reining, and cutting

== Feet and base ==
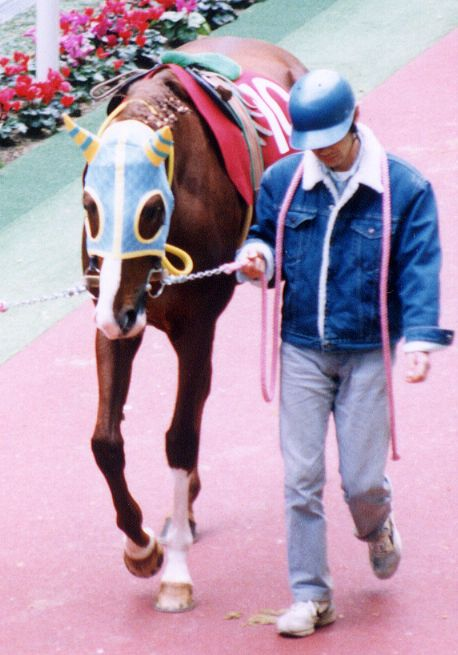
Toeing out causing the horse to wing-in with the front legs.

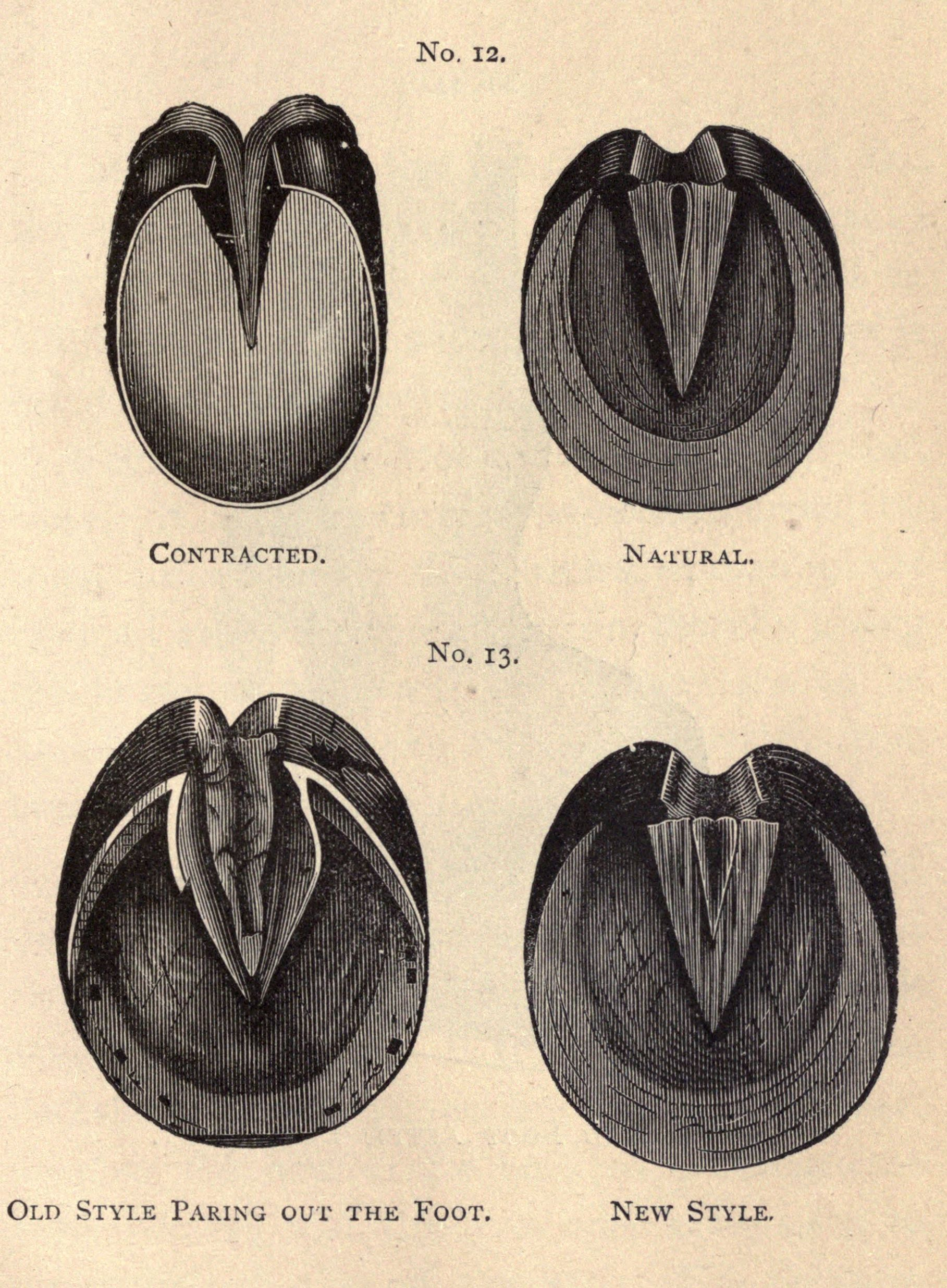
Horse feet conformation

The hooves bear all the weight of the horse. As each foot hits the ground, a concussive force passes through the foot up to the leg. The complex structure of the hoof is designed to absorb this impact, preventing injury. The internal hoof structure also aids circulation. When a horse is ridden, the weight of the rider adds to the force absorbed by the legs and feet. Poor conformation of the feet may lead to uneven or ineffective distribution of these impacts, in some cases increasing the risk of injury. Therefore, the hoof conformation is important to soundness.

Toe-Out/Splay Footed

- The horse's feet are turned away from each other
- Common fault
- Causes winging motion that may lead to interfering injury around fetlock or splint.
- As horse wings inward, there is a chance that he may step on himself, stumble, and fall.
- A horse that is "tied in behind the elbow" has restricted movement of the upper arm because there is less clearance for the humerus (it angles into the body too much). Reduced clearance of legs causes horse to toe-out to compensate.

Toe-In, Pigeon-Toed

- Toes of hooves face in toward each other
- Common fault
- Pigeon-toes cause excess strain on the outside of the lower structures of the limb as the horse hits hard on the outside hoof wall. This often leads to high or low ringbone. The horse is also predisposed to sidebone and sole bruising.
- The horse moves with a paddling motion, wasting energy and hastening fatigue so that he has less stamina.

Base Narrow in Front
Toed-Out or Toed-In

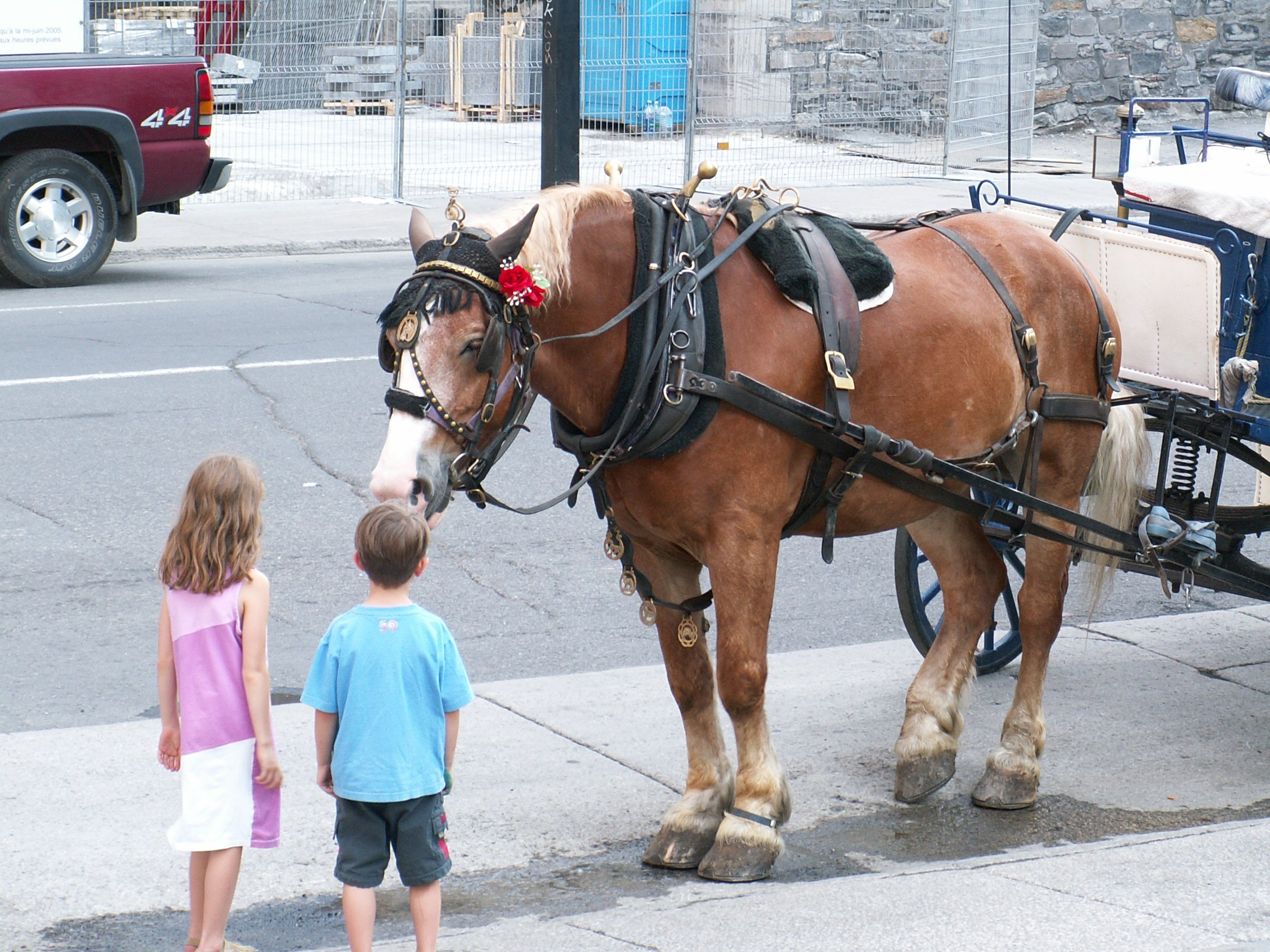
Base narrow in front

- The feet are closer together and more under the body than the shoulders
- Fairly common fault
- Base-narrow, toed-out: Stresses the outside structures of the limb, especially the outside of the foot. Causes a winging motion, leading to interfering. Predisposes the horse to plaiting. The horse tends to hit himself more when fatigued.
- Base narrow, toed-in: Excessive strain on the lateral structures of fetlock, pastern, and outside of hoof wall. Causes the horse to paddle.
- The horse is least suited for speed or agility sports.

Base Wide in Front: Toed-In or Toed-Out

- The horse stands with its feet placed wider at the shoulders, often associated with a narrow chest.
- Uncommon fault
- Base wide, toed-out: the horse lands hard on the outside of the hoof wall and places excessive strain on the medial structures of the fetlock and pastern, leading to ringbone or sidebone, & potentially spraining structures of the carpus. The horse will wing in, possibly leading to an interference injury or overload injury of the splint bone.
- Base wide, toed-in: the horse lands hard on the inside hoof wall, placing stress on the medial structures of limb. The horse will also paddle.

Stands Close Behind/Base Narrow Behind

- With a plumb line from the point of buttock, the lower legs & feet are placed more toward the midline than the regions of hips & thigh, with a plumb line falling to the outside of the lower leg from the hock downward. Usually accompanied by bow-legged conformation.
- A fairly common fault, especially in heavily muscled horses like Quarter Horses.
- The hooves tend to wing in, so the horse is more likely to interfere. If the hocks touch, they may also interfere.
- The horse can not develop speed for rapid acceleration.
- The outside of the hocks, fetlocks, & hooves receive excessive stress & pressure. This leads to DJD, ligament strain, hoof bruising, & quarter cracks.
- The horse is best for non-speed sports & those that do not require spins, dodges, or tight turns

The Hoof

Feet Too Small

- Relative to size and body mass, the feet are proportionately small
- There is a propensity to breed for small feet in Thoroughbreds, Saddlebreds, and American Quarter Horses.
- A small foot is less capable of diffusing impact stress with each footfall than a larger one.
- On hard footing, the foot itself receives extra concussion. Over time, this can lead to sole bruising, laminitis, heel soreness, navicular disease, and ringbone. Sore-footed horses take short, choppy strides, so they have a rough ride and no gait efficiency.
- If the horse has good shoeing support, it can comfortably participate in any sport, although it is more likely to stay sound in sports that involve soft footing.

Feet Large and Flat/ Mushroom-Footed

- Large in width & breadth relative to body size & mass. May have slight pastern bones relative to large coffin bone.
- Flat feet limit the soundness of the horse in concussion sports (jumping, eventing, steeplechase, distance riding).
- Without proper shoeing or support, the sole may flatten. Low, flat soles are predisposed to laminitis or bruising. The horse takes on a choppy, short stride. It is hard for the horse to walk on rocky or rugged footing without extra protection on the hoof.
- A large foot with good cup to sole is ideal foot for any horse. There is less incidence of lameness, and it is associated with good bone.
- For flat footed horses, sports with soft footing and short distances like dressage, equitation, flat racing, barrel racing are best.

Mule Feet

- Horse has a narrow, oval foot with steep walls
- Mule feet are fairly common, usually seen in American Quarter Horses, Arabians, Saddlebreds, Tennessee Walkers, Foxtrotters, and Mules
- A mule foot provides little shock absorption to foot & limb, creating issues like sole bruising, corns, laminitis, navicular, sidebone, and ringbone. Not all horses have soundness issues, especially if they are light on the front end & have very tough horn.
- Because the hind end provides propulsion, it is normal to see more narrower hooves on back compared to front
- Soft-terrain sports like polo, dressage, arena work (equitation, reining, cutting), and pleasure riding are most suitable

Coon-Footed

- The slope of hoof wall is steeper than the pastern, often associated with long, sloping pasterns tending to the horizontal, which breaks the angulation between pastern and hoof. Usually seen in rear feet, esp in post-legged horses. Coon feet are sometimes due to a weak suspensory that allows the fetlock to drop.
- Quite uncommon, it particularly affects speed sports and agility sports
- Coon feet create similar problems as too long & sloping pasterns (the horse prone to run-down injuries on back of fetlock). If foot lift off is delayed in bad footing, ligament and tendon strain & injury to the sesamoid bones is likely.
- Weakness to supporting ligaments due to post leg or injury to suspensory will result in a coon-foot as the fetlock drops.
- The horse is most suited for low-speed exercise like pleasure riding or equitation

Club Foot

- The slope of the front face of hoof exceeds 60 degrees. Horse often has long, upright heels. May be from contracture of DDF (deep digital flexor tendon) that was not addressed at birth or developed from nutritional imbalances or trauma.
- Fairly common, best to use horse in activities done in soft-footing & those that depend on strong hindquarter usage
- Various degrees of angulation, from slight to very pronounced. Horses with obvious club feet land more on the toes, causing toe bruising or laminitis. The horse generally does poorly at prolonged exercise, especially if on hard or uneven terrain (eventing, trail riding).
- Because the toe is easily bruised, the horse moves with a short, choppy stride, and may stumble. The horse is a poor jumping prospect due to trauma incurred on impact of landing.

Contracted Heels

- The heels appear narrow and the sulci of frogs are deep while the frog may be atrophied
- May be seen in any breed, but most common in American Quarter Horses, Thoroughbreds, Saddlebreds, Tennessee Walkers, or Gaited horses
- Contracted heels are not normally inherited, but a symptom of limb unsoundness. A horse in pain will protect the limb by landing more softly on it. Over time, the structures contract. The source of pain should be explored by a vet.
- Contracted heels create problems like thrush. The horse loses shock absorption ability, potentially contributing to the development of navicular syndrome, sole bruising, laminitis, and corns. Heel expansibility may also be restricted, causing lameness from pressure around the coffin bone and reduced elasticity of the digital cushion.
- Horse is best used for non-concussion sports.

Thin Walls

- Wall is narrow and thin when viewed from bottom. Often associated with flat feet or too small feet.
- Common, especially in American Quarter Horses, Thoroughbreds, and Saddlebreds.
- Thin walls reduce the weight-bearing base of support, and are often accompanied by flat or tender soles that easily bruise. The horse is subject to developing corns at the angles of the bar. The horse tends to grow long-toes with low heels, moving the hoof tubules in horizontal direction, and so it reduces shock absorption ability and increases the risk of lameness.
- Less integrity for expansion and flexion of hoof, making it more brittle and prone to sand & quarter cracks. Narrow white line makes it hard to hold shoes on.
- Horse does best when worked only on soft footing.

Flared Hoof Wall

- One side of the hoof flares towards its bottom, relative to the steep appearance of the other side. Flared surface is concave.
- Horse is best to use in low-impact or low-speed sports
- May be conformationally induced from angular limb deformity or malalignments of the bones within the hoof. These conformational problems cause excess strain on one side of hoof making it steepen, while the side with less impact grows to a flare. The coronary band often slopes asymmetrically due to pushing of hoof wall & coronet on steep side, which gets more impact than flared. May develop sheared heels, causing lameness issues, contracted heels & thrush.
- May be acquired from imbalanced trimming methods over time that stimulate more stress on one side of foot.
- Chronic lameness may make the horse load the limb unevenly, even if the lameness may be in hock or stifle.

== Overall balance and bone ==
Insufficient Bone

- Measuring the circumference of the top of the cannon bone, just below the knee, gives an estimation of the substance. Ideally a 1,000 lb horse should have 7-8 inches. Insufficient is less than 7 inches for every 1,000 lb of weight.
- A horse with insufficient bone is more at risk for injury (within the bones, joints, muscle, tendons, ligaments, and feet).
- Repeated impact creates soundness issues, especially in those sports with a lot of concussion (jumping, galloping, racing, long-distance trail). Track horses get bucked shins, event and trail horses get strained tendons and ligaments.

Light-Framed/Fine Boned

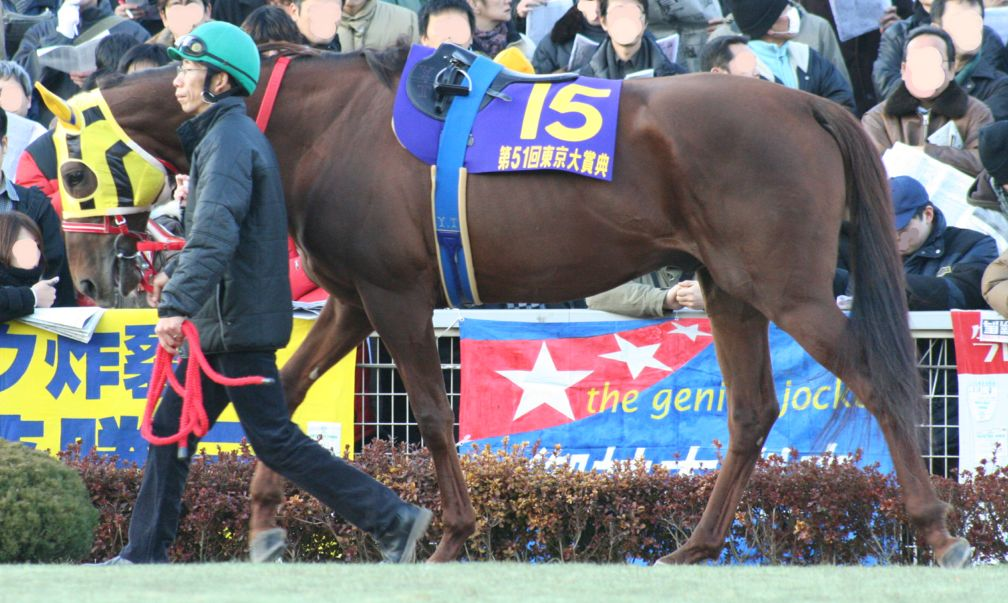
Light-framed Thoroughbred

- Substance of long bones is slight and thin relative to the size & mass of the horse. Especially noticed in the area of the cannon & pastern.
- Seen especially in show horses, halter horses in non-performance work, Paso Finos, Gaited horses, and Thoroughbreds.
- Affects the longevity of hard-working performance horses.
- See "insufficient bone." Does not provide ample support for bulky musculature & there is a lack of harmony visually.
- Theoretically, a lighter frame reduces the weight on the end of the limbs, making it easier to pick up the legs & move freely across the ground. However, with a lot of speed & impact work, light bone suffers concussion injury, leading to bucked shins, splints, & stress fractures. Tendons, ligaments, & muscles have less lever system to pull across to effectively use or develop muscle strength for power & stamina.
- It is best to match the horse with a petite & lean rider. It is best to use the horse for pleasure, trail, driving, non-impact sports, and non-speed work.

Coarse-Boned/Sturdy-Framed

- Overall bones are larger, wider, & stronger in a horse with either light or bulky muscled appearance.
- Advantageous for any sport, the horse tends to hold up well.
- The horses tend to be rugged and durable, capable of carrying large weights relative to size.
- Big, solid bones provide strong levers for the muscles to pull against to improve efficiency of motion, thus minimizing the effort of exercise & reduces the likelihood of fatigue, contributing to endurance. May add mass to each leg, and consequently slightly hinder speed.

== See also ==
- Glossary of equestrian terms
