= Australian Riding Pony =

Breed of pony

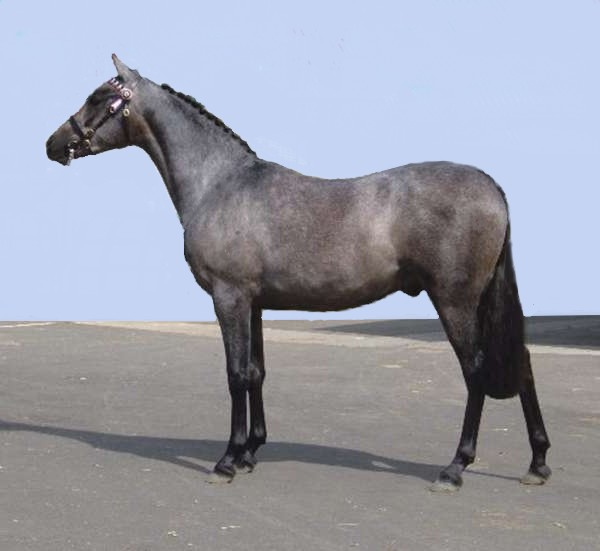
- Country of origin: Australia

Breed standards
- Riding Pony Stud Book Society Ltd

The Australian Riding Pony is a breed of pony developed in Australia since the 1970s. It has been greatly influenced by the British Riding Pony, the Thoroughbred and Arabian bloodlines.

== Characteristics ==
These ponies are small copies of elegant show hacks, developed from English Riding Pony bloodlines. They range in height from 12.2 to 14.2 hands (50 to 58 inches, 127 to 147 cm) in contrast to the Australian Pony breed, which does not exceed 14 hands (56 inches, 142 cm). Australian Riding Ponies have a free-flowing, lower action than many of the older pony breeds. Australian Riding Ponies are of one of the solid colors, with small heads and ears.

== Breed history ==
Equids are not native to Australia. The imported foundation sires which contributed to the establishment of the Australian Riding Pony were:

- Aristocrat of Flawforth, imported in 1973, who was out of the Thoroughbred/Welsh mare Chirk Catmint.
- Treharne Talisman a son of Bwlch Valentino
- The Laird, imported to South Australia, also a son of Bwlch Valentino.

The Australian Riding Pony Stud Book Society was formed in about 1980 in the wake of interest aroused in the Riding Ponies that were shown in several Royal Shows. A foundation section was formed which required at least three crosses of animals from approved breeds before a pony could be entered in Section A. Originally there were four sections, but with the foundation firmly established some have been finished. Nowadays most of the major British and New Zealand bloodlines are represented in the Australian Riding Ponies. The use of artificial insemination has permitted even more bloodlines.

== Uses ==
Today, the pony is mainly used as a children's show mount and for small adult riders. They compete in dressage, show jumping, combined driving, gymkhana, mounted games, and horse shows.

== See also ==
- German Riding Pony
- Welsh pony

== Other sources ==
- Huntington, Peter, Jane Myers, Elizabeth Owens: Horse Sense: The Guide to Horse Care in Australia and New Zealand. Nature: 2004, p. 86.
