= French Saddle Pony =

Pony breed

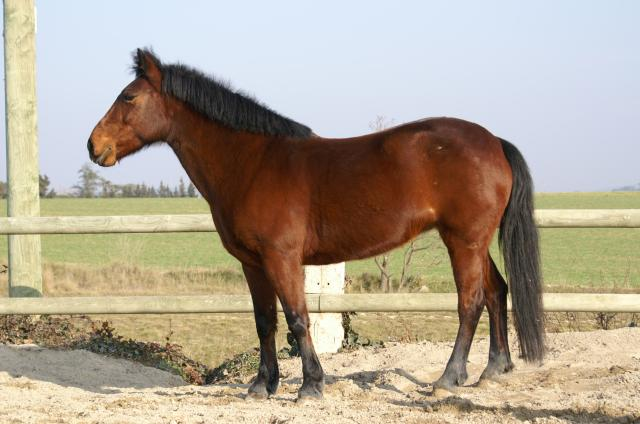

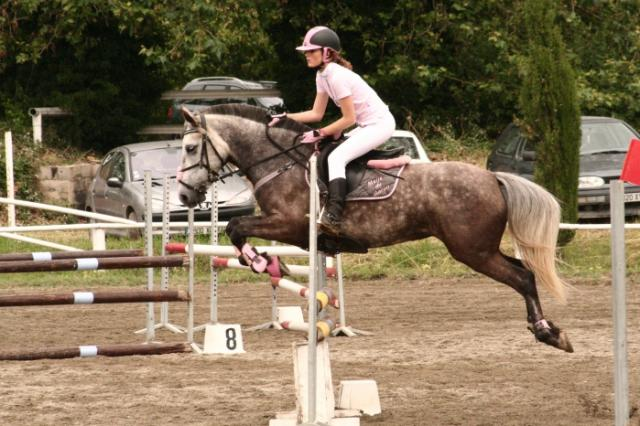
- Other names: Poney Français de Selle
- Country of origin: France

Breed standards
- Association Nationale du Poney Français de Selle; Haras Nationaux

The French Saddle Pony, also called the Poney Français de Selle, is a pony breed developed as a sport horse for children and smaller adult riders. It was initially developed in 1969 as the Poney de Croisement (Cross-bred Pony), and in 1972 a stud book was created. In 1991 the stud book was closed and the breed renamed to Poney Français de Selle. The breed combines a mix of French and British pony breeds, as well as Thoroughbred and Arabian blood, to create the horse seen today. Due to the large number of breeds used to create the French Saddle Pony, there is not yet a defined set of physical characteristics for the breed, although all tend to be suited for competition in English riding disciplines, including dressage, show jumping and three-day eventing. They fill a similar role as the British riding pony and the German riding pony.

== Characteristics ==
The French Saddle Pony stands 125–148 centimetres (12.1–14.2 hands) high and can be any color. A set standard type does not yet exist, due to differences in bloodlines between various ponies, but the desired type is that of a small saddle horse. Despite the differences, the majority of ponies have some physical characteristics in common. The head is small with a straight or convex profile. The neck is long, withers prominent, the chest wide and deep and the shoulders sloping and long. The croup is sloping and the legs are strong with large, clean joints and clearly defined tendons.

== Breed history ==
The breeding program for the French Saddle Pony was initiated in 1969 by the Association Française du Poney de Croisement (French Association of Cross-bred Ponies), who wanted to create and promote a French Sport Pony, initially under the name Poney de Croisement (Cross-bred Pony). A stud book was created for the breed in 1972, and in 1991 the registry was closed to outside blood and the breed was renamed to Poney Français de Selle. The first ponies were created from a mixture of Arabian, New Forest, Welsh, Connemara and Thoroughbred blood. Later, Landais, Pottok, Merens and Basque blood was added.

Today, the biggest breeding areas are in Mayenne, Normandy and Brittany, although the breed can be found throughout France. Due to its success in competition, it is becoming increasingly popular outside France. Between 1977 and 2000, registrations increased from 95 to almost 1,300, although the population has declined slightly between 1997 and 2012—a trend common to all French pony breeds.

== Uses ==
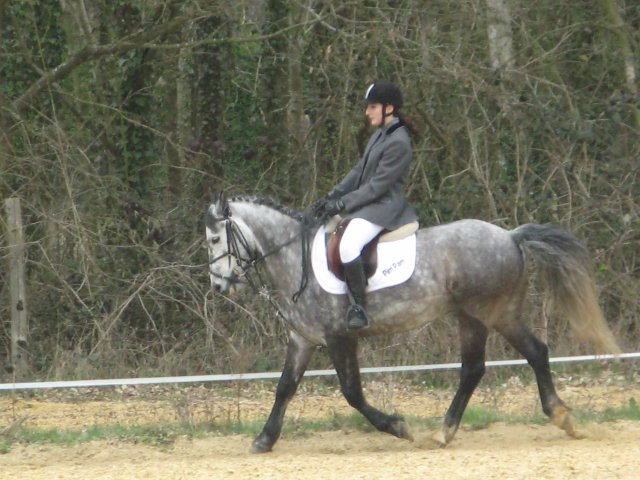
French Saddle Pony practicing dressage

French Saddle Ponies are mainly used as riding horses in competition events such as show jumping, dressage and three-day eventing, but are also used as harness ponies and for recreational riding. Many riding schools use French Saddle Ponies for novice riders, although they are also seen in competition as high as the international level. The breed fills a role similar to that of the British Riding Pony and the German riding pony.

== See also ==
- List of French horse breeds
