= Celle State Stud =

Coordinates: 52.61578°N 10.0745°E

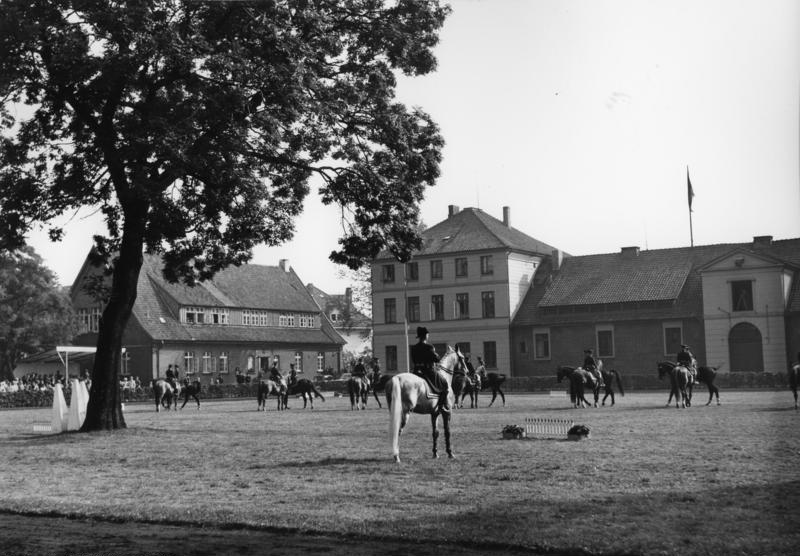
The State Stud of Celle in 1956

Celle State Stud is a state-owned facility for horse breeding in Celle, Germany. The State Stud of Celle, located in what is now known as Lower Saxony, was founded in 1735 by order of George II, King of Great Britain, Elector of Hanover and Duke of Brunswick-Lüneburg. Its purpose was to make high-quality stallions available to local breeders. Several wars affected not only the safety of the horses, but the types of stallions housed there. Celle's history is intertwined with the history of the Hanoverian horse breed, but the breed registry is privately owned and is an entity independent of the stud. Today the state stud is known for its annual stallion parades.

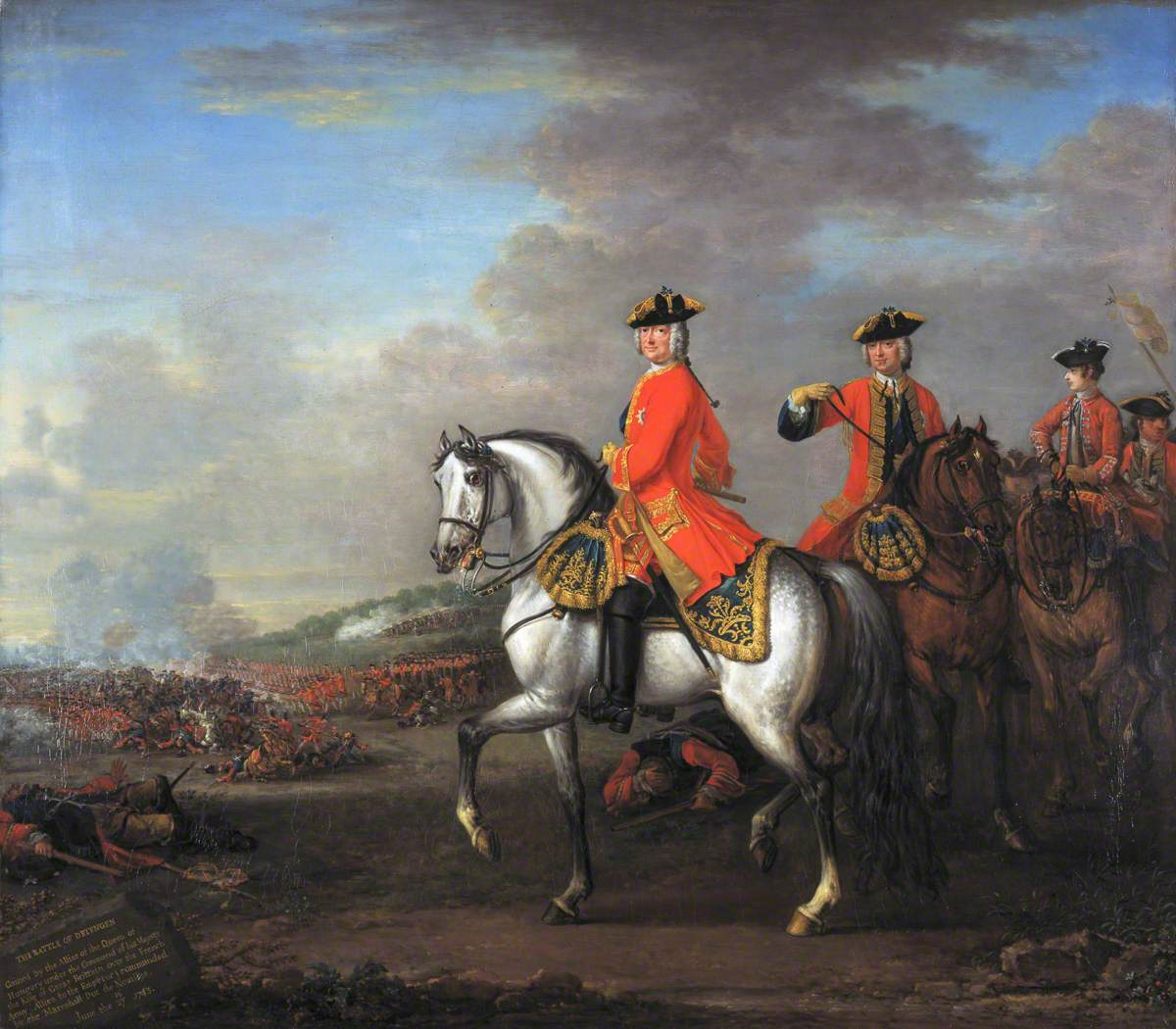
George II of Great Britain established the State Stud at Celle by royal decree.

== History ==
The Lower Saxony State Stud of Celle was founded on July 27, 1735. Celle's foundation is unique among the state studs of Germany, because it was not originally based on a royal stud or courtly stables. It was established by the decree of King George II of Great Britain, also the Elector of Hanover and Duke of Braunschweig-Lüneburg. Although it was established by this royal decree, the stud has always been "exclusively for the improvement of horse breeding for farmers." The quality of local stock had a direct impact on the safety of a sovereign region. In times of war, cavalry horses were recruited locally from farmers, and the quality of remounts affected the outcomes of battles. Furthermore, nobles wanted quality riding horses for personal use and harness horses for carriage transport. Poor quality local stock meant that nobles had to rely on importation for quality horses. Establishment of a state stud meant that fine riding and driving horses could be purchased locally, reducing trade dependence on other autonomous regions. The first sires to stand there were 12 black Holsteiners. Young stallions were generally imported from Mecklenburg and England. Despite the close connection between Hanover and Great Britain, Thoroughbred horses could not play a role in the founding of the stud, as the breed was in its infancy in Celle's own early years. Pedigrees were recorded in Celle's studbooks as early as the end of the 18th century.

=== Napoleonic wars ===
The Napoleonic Wars, from 1803 to 1815, decimated horse populations, including those at the State Stud of Celle. In 1803, the 100 stallions living at Celle had to be evacuated to Mecklenburg, of which only 30 returned. While the war was responsible for the loss of many horses, horse breeding expanded to meet the needs of the cavalries, such that the population of stallions at Celle had returned to pre-war numbers within 15 years. In the aftermath of the wars, King George IV assisted in the repopulation of the State Stud of Celle with about 50 of his own stallions. These stallions, which came from his private stables, were stationed in various parts of his kingdom and utilized by locals. In 1829, King George IV discontinued this practice, and purchased 26 excellent stallions for Celle.

=== Thoroughbred influence ===
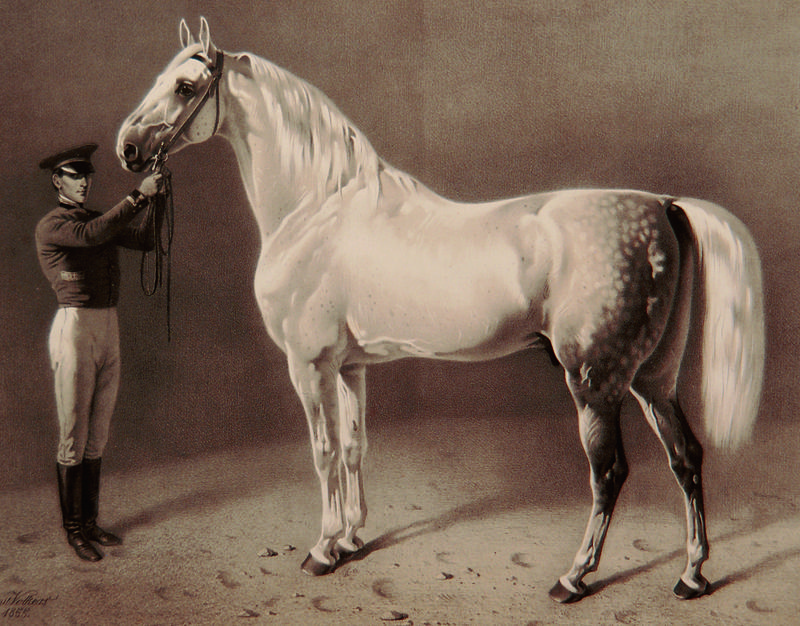
Holderness, a grey Yorkshire Coach Horse stallion painted by Emil Volkers (1831-1905) in 1855, named for Holderness in Yorkshire, England. Holderness covered mares at the Celle State Stud from 1844 to 1861.

The pedigrees of Thoroughbreds were first organized on a large scale by the General Stud Book in 1791, effectively creating the original breed registry for Thoroughbreds. Within fifty years, the rising prominence of the breed and the personal union between Hanover and Great Britain saw an influx of Thoroughbred and part-Thoroughbred stallions, including Yorkshire Coach Horses, a cross between a Thoroughbred and a Cleveland Bay. Further use of Thoroughbred stallions is credited to the state equerries of the mid-19th century. The state equerry is a government position which oversees activities related to the horses of a region.

From 1866, the state equerries of Hanover were two brothers, August and Frederick von Spörken, who imported over 100 Thoroughbred-influenced stallions from England. These stallions were used to breed larger, more refined, more energetic and enduring mounts. Ultimately, nearly a third of the sires at Celle were Thoroughbred or of Thoroughbred extraction. This demographic resulted in horses that were too physically and temperamentally refined for farm work, and a period of consolidation followed much Thoroughbred influence.

=== World Wars I and II ===
World War I raged between 1914 and 1918. During this period, warring nations avidly developed new advantages in the form of mechanized warfare. Simultaneously, demand for cavalry horses during the war itself was high, and Celle helped meet this demand by increasing the number of stallions available at the main stud and its outposts from 350 to 500 by 1924. The prestige associated with the cavalry made many nations slow to replace them, but the role of the horse in warfare dwindled steadily with the advent of tanks. Without the armed forces to purchase their stock, breeders around Celle began to cut back, and then to refocus. Between the First and Second World Wars, horses primarily fulfilled agricultural roles, such as pulling plows and farm machinery. This market change was not limited to any one part of Germany, and as a result, Celle supplied breeders with heavier, stronger stallions with which to breed their mares. To cope with the expansion of horse breeding during this period, new outposts of the State Stud were established.

This change did not endure, as another bout of human ingenuity was spurred on by World War II, which lasted from 1939 to 1945. One of the outcomes of the war was mechanized agriculture. In particular, widespread access to tractors all but eliminated the need for farm horses. Mechanization of transportation, warfare, and agriculture eliminated, in succession, the working horse. What remained in the wake of World War II was riding for fun.

=== Modern Celle ===
In 1945, what remained of the refined Trakehners evacuated East Prussia, fleeing from Russian troops. Some of these elegant horses made their way to Celle, and as breeding aim changed to feature the riding horse, many were incorporated into the stud farm. Since 1945, many Thoroughbreds and Trakehners, and some Anglo-Arabians, have occupied stalls at the State Stud at Celle. Today, 140 stallions including 10 Thoroughbreds, 2 Anglo-Arabians, 2 Trakehners, and 3 ponies serve approximately 8000 broodmares per year. Since the 1980s, private stallion ownership in Hannover has steadily increased, however over 60% of Hanoverian mares are still served by the state-owned stallions of Celle.

== Stallion Parade ==
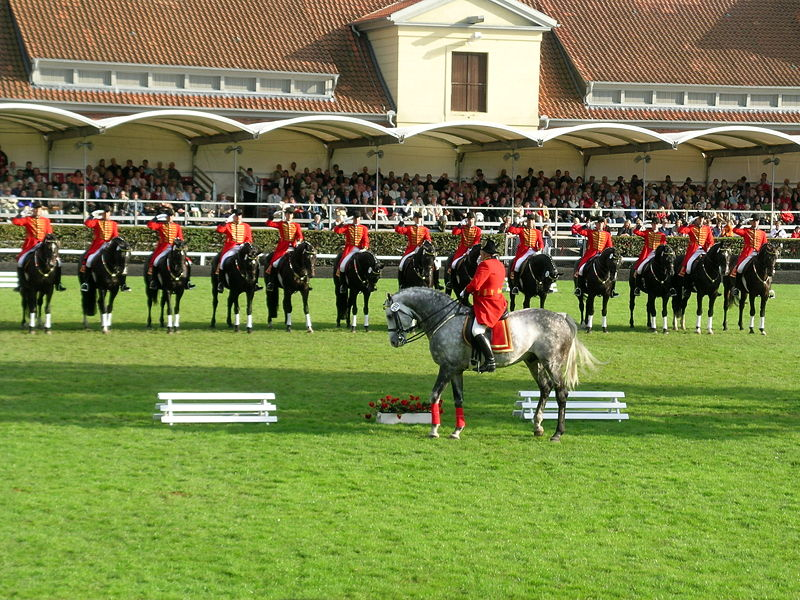
This exhibition of black and dark bay stallions is part of the annual Celle Stallion Parade.

On the last two weekends in September and the first weekend in October, the State Stud of Celle puts on a stallion parade or hengstparade. The parades are a major tourist attraction every year. The tradition of exhibiting all the state-owned sires to the public began in 1908. Stallions perform in a variety of acts, some showcasing their performance capabilities in dressage or show jumping demonstrations, while others are shown in-harness. Highly coordinated, color-matched drill teams are perennial favorites. The parade is an opportunity for the stud to showcase the less competitive talents of the stallions, as well. Stallions may be driven in groups of up to thirteen at a time, or in trick-riding formations called "Roman riding." For many years, the solid black Escudo II performed tricks on cue with a handler, without a saddle or a bridle.

== Affiliations ==
In order to make state-owned stallions available to residents outside of Celle itself, stallions stood at a number of stallion depots, which were scattered throughout Lower Saxony. Today, such regional breeding centers are located in Aurich, Dorum, Landesbrück, Oberndorf, Bargstedt, Roydorf, Verden, Ankum, Süstedt, and Adelheidsdorf. Each of these regional centers administers subordinate stallion depots. In 1800, there were no fewer than 50 service stations, all told. Other stud farms have also played roles in Celle's history. In 1824, the Braunschweig State Stud of Bad Harzburg-Bündheim was founded. Along with the State Stud at Osnabrück-Eversburg founded in 1925, the Braunschweig State Stud was dissolved in 1961. The stallions stationed at these studs were relocated to Celle. Some state-run horse facilities, while connected with Celle, do not stand stallions. A facility at Hunnesrück at Solling is devoted to the rearing of up to 40 young stallions of each vintage, preparing them for licensing.

Modern-day Celle has a close affiliation with the Hannover University of Veterinary Medicine. This link has made Hanoverian stallions frequent subjects and beneficiaries of research into equine artificial insemination, embryo transfer, and fertility.

=== Adelheidsdorf ===
Perhaps the best-known of Celle's outposts is the Stallion Performance Test Center at Adelheidsdorf. Young stallions which have been licensed by the Hanoverian stallion commission based on their conformation, movement and jumping prowess, attend a rigorous ridden performance test to achieve lifetime approval. A certain number of the young Hanoverian stallions are candidates to stand at Celle, pending their completion of the 11-month performance test at Adelheidsdorf. Today, most performance tests for warmblood stallions are 30 days or 70 days long; Adelheidsdorf's nearly year-long examination is exceptional.

The first stallion performance test by Celle was in 1927. Over the years, the demands of the stallion test have been changed to reflect the needs of the breeders, whether the market required a versatile driving and cavalry horse, a farm horse, or a riding horse. Today, shorter tests for ponies, draft horses, and specialty breeds such as Fjord horses are also held at Adelheidsdorf.

Licensing, a process by which a panel of experts determines whether a young stallion is suitable for breeding, began in association with the State Stud at Celle in the mid-19th century. Locals complained that there were many privately owned stallions of poor quality offered at stud in the Kingdom of Hannover. In 1844, under Ernest Augustus, King of Hanover, an ordinance made it illegal to accept money for stud services of a privately owned stallions without the stallion being inspected and issued a license by a royal committee, the Körkommission. The original körkommission was composed of two to three landowners, a cavalry officer, and a veterinarian. This process had the desired effect of eliminating major heritable defects, and helped Celle remain the most prominent source of breeding stallions.

=== Herrenhausen ===
Herrenhausen was a royal property, used as a summer house, which bred its own strains of well-known horses for ceremonial use. Cream-colored carriage horses, possibly of Persian extraction, were bred at Herrenhausen well before George II of Great Britain first brought them to England. Napoleon stole a number of the Hanoverian creams, and used them to pull his carriage at his coronation. The Hanoverian creams, and a strain of white horses, were sold after Herrenhausen's breeding activities were dissolved in the 1920s.

== Important sires ==
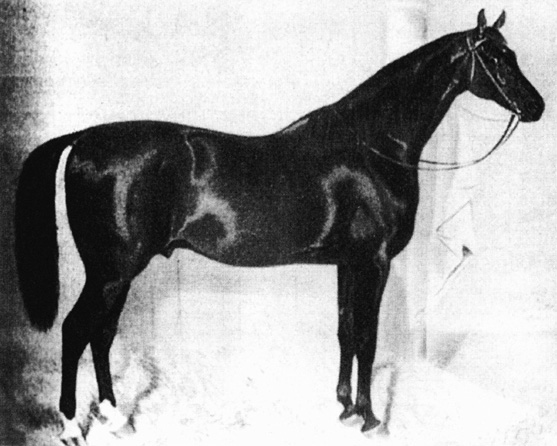
The Pomeranian-bred Jellachich stood at Celle from 1850 until his death in 1866. Celle frequently purchased stallions from Mecklenburg and Vorpommern throughout much of the stud's history.

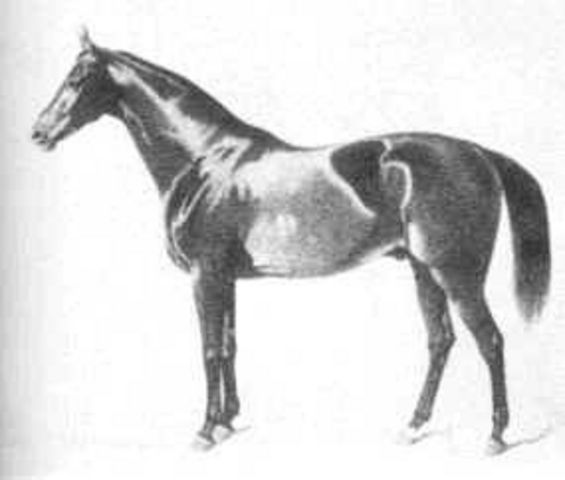
Zernebog (1845–1871) was a foundation stallion for the Hanoverian breed, and his descendants in the male line make up the F and W families. He was born in Mecklenburg and was purchased by Celle.

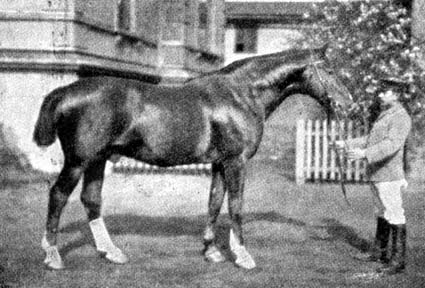
Alnok, a Celle stallion born in 1888, was sired by the Thoroughbred Adeptus. Adeptus is represented by male line descendants like E.T. FRH and Eiger.

Celle has stood a number of important sires, including many founders of the Hanoverian breed, including Zernebog (sometimes written Zerneborg or Zemeboq). Zernebog was born in 1845 in Pomerania, with a Thoroughbred sire – Jupiter xx – and damsire. He stood at Celle from 1848 until his death in 1871. Today he is represented by a male family so large that it had to be split in two: the F-line and the W-line. These families are represented in dressage by Olympic medalists including Wansuela Suerte, Weltall, Farbenfroh, Woycek, and in the dressage breeding legacy of Weltmeyer. Another Pomeranian stallion, Jellachich, stood at Celle from 1850 to 1866. While he is not represented by modern male descendants, his daughter produced, by Zernebog, the stallion Fling, who propagated the F and W lineages. Similarly, the bay Mecklenburger Norfolk, who stood at Celle from 1849 to 1871, is counted among the foundation sires of the Hanoverian horse because of his contribution through his daughters rather than his sons.

Apart from Zernebog, several early Thoroughbred stallions who founded lasting dynasties in the Hanoverian genepool were selected to stand at the State Stud of Celle. The earliest, a chestnut sired by Adonis xx, was Adeptus xx, who served mares at Celle and its outposts from 1884 to 1904. Adeptus's descendants through the male line were named, according to custom, with the initial letter "A" for several generations, and was then switched to "E." His modern-day descendants include Eiger, 1996 Hanoverian Stallion of the Year. Eiger himself is the sire of Espri, sire of the recently cloned show jumping champion E.T. FRH, and of Escudo I and Escudo II, who are known for versatile, conformationally-correct offspring. In the wake of Adeptus xx, during a period in which Celle relied heavily on Thoroughbreds, came Devil's Own xx. Devil's Own was foaled in 1887, and stood at Celle from 1894 until 1906. His descendants include the Olympic jumper Deister and the all-important Donnerhall. Another descendant, Duellant, founded important sire lines outside of Hannover. Finally, there was Goldschaum xx born in 1891, whose descendant Goldfisch II has survived in the male line to modern day. The important sires in this family include Grande, Gotthard, and Grannus, himself a descendant of Grande. These stallions have all had unusual starts to their careers: Gotthard, and his offspring, are notoriously slow to mature, and he was nearly passed over for his ugly-duckling appearance. Grannus, fiery and magnetic, was written off by some breeders because of his petite offspring. It wasn't until his children started jumping the highest jumps the world had to offer that his true talent showed. Olympians from this line include dressage stars like Isabel Werth's Gigolo, Graf George in the United States, show jumpers like Graf Grande, Genius, and Goldfever.

Stallions of note from the 20th and 21st century that called Celle home have included the Trakehners Absatz, Lateran, and Semper Idem; Thoroughbreds Der Löwe xx, Pik As xx, Black Sky xx, Lauries Crusader xx, and Prince Thatch xx; the Anglo-Arabian Matcho X; and the Hanoverians Espri, Escudo I and II, Weltmeyer and Wolkentanz.
