= Honey Craven =

- Born: Clarence Leo "Honey" Craven; September 10, 1904; Brookline, Massachusetts, United States
- Died: July 22, 2003 (aged 98); Guilford, Connecticut, United States
- Occupation(s): Equestrian, ringmaster, and manager
- Spouse: Eileen Griffin (m. 1930; died 1980)

Clarence Leo "Honey" Craven (September 10, 1904 – July 22, 2003), was an American equestrian, ringmaster and manager of the National Horse Show at Madison Square Garden in New York, the Devon Horse Show in Pennsylvania, and ringmaster at nearly every prominent horse show in the United States. He also managed the Eastern States Show, the Children's Services Show and the North Shore Horse Show.

== Life and career ==
Craven was born and raised in Brookline, Massachusetts (near Boston). His father was an Irish liveryman who worked for Harris Upham's brokerage firm. Craven said his nickname came from an old vaudeville song, "Honey Boy." He started working with horses at age 12 when, after school, he would pick up horses from nearby estates and take them to a blacksmith's shop, sometimes riding bareback. He left high school after his freshman year to gallop racehorses, then worked as an exercise boy for a wealthy grocer, James Butler, who showed hunters and jumpers. He aspired to being a racing jockey, and rode half-mile tracks summers in New England, but he never rode races on the big time. He then turned to riding jumpers in shows.

In 1927, Craven began his association with the National Horse Show, the United States' showcase equestrian competition. He was recommended by W. Reginald Rives, secretary of the National. Always a meticulous dresser with never a button wrong, Honey recalled, "I think he picked me because I already had classy riding clothes." As assistant ringmaster, wearing top hat, gloves, red jacket and white jodhpurs, he sounded the coaching horn to summon the horses and the riders. He earned $10 a day and generous gratuities. Once, an owner tipped him $500 for pinning a blue ribbon on his horse, which would have received it, tip or not.

In 1928, Craven was promoted to ringmaster, a job he held for 30 years. He was the president of the Professional Horsemen's Association. In February 1958, when he was appointed as the National's manager, a job he held for 25 years. From 1983 until his death, he held the title Manager Emeritus, even though he retired from the show in 1991.

When he took the job as manager of the National Horse Show, he had never managed a show. At the old Garden, the show could use the National Armory stables for 500 horses, but after the move to the new Garden in 1968, only 311 stalls were available, some of which could only be used for tack. Each year Craven shoehorned upward of 300 horses into the fifth-floor walk-up that served as the stabling area at the Garden, an after-dark maneuver that often took place while a New York Rangers hockey game was being played below. It also meant dozens of temporary stalls in horse vans on the streets of the garment district and headaches for Craven. It was an annual tradition for newspapers to carry a photo of dump trucks unloading tons of loam and binder's clay onto the concrete floor of the Garden - the same dirt that was rented and returned each November for more than 40 years. Craven also had to streamline the show and cut some traditional classes to enable the show to end by 11 o'clock p.m. to avoid overtime pay to Garden employees.

Until it moved from 1989 to 1995 to the New Jersey Meadowlands, the National Horse Show was the second longest-running sporting event in New York City after the Westminster Kennel Club Dog Show. In 1999 it returned to the Garden. "Moving it to New Jersey was the biggest mistake ever made," said Honey. "Some nights, there weren't even enough people in the stands to start a bridge game."

At Devon he served successively as ringmaster, manager and manager emeritus. He became manager of the show in 1976. When he began there as ringmaster in 1939, there was no public-address system. He would announce the class judging, determine when the next class would start, then mount a polo pony and race to the barns to pass along the information so the exhibitors could get their horses into the ring on time. Then he would return to the ring.

As ringmaster, his job was more than blowing the horn to call the classes. He was responsible for policing the ring, assisting the judges and solving any problems that arose. Craven was known as one who wouldn't permit any second-rate behavior, but whose primary concern was always the welfare of the horse and rider.

Sportswriter Red Smith recounted the tale Honey told of the Sunday when a Monsignor Melton, midway through a sermon, recognized two horse show stewards in the congregation. "The Monsignor was familiar with the hand signals stewards use to advise the judge that a horse has made a half-fault at this fence or one fault at that one. He was going flat out on the subject of sin and salvation when he stumbled on a word and saw a steward's fingers move. Half a fault. The other steward nodded. Monsignor Melton swallowed, took his best hold and went on, but every now and then he saw a hand move. Score for the course: five faults and out." During jumping and hunting events, Craven sounded a wail on the foxhunt horn to give a horse the gate (disqualification).

Although some complained that he had trouble producing an ideal sound from his carriage horn, Craven was recognized as the foremost expert in the United States on English Coaching horns, where every note has to be made by the lip and tongue. The instrument he sometimes called his "yard of tin" was almost as tall as the elfin Honey. Craven said that "I practice every day, no matter where I am. It's the only way to keep up my proficiency." He could be heard practicing under the stands after the show ended at the National at Madison Square Garden. Craven once admired a Boosey, the "Stradivarius" of coaching horns, in a collection in August Busch's coach house and the brewing magnate gave it to him. "Mellowest tone I ever heard," Honey said.

He was imaginative enough to persuade Doc Severinsen, the band leader, to do the job at the National one night. "He hit the high notes and brought the house down," Mr. Craven recalled. "My board of directors wanted him to come back every night, the heck with me." Although Craven gave away most of his instruments when his lungs gave out in 1990, he kept a slender silver carriage horn inscribed from Severinson until his death.

Before and during his horse-show jobs, he worked in Boston, Massachusetts for the London Harness Shop, selling saddles to Gen. George S. Patton and playing coachman for the Vanderbilts and other society families.

Craven was depicted in ringmaster regalia on the cover of New Yorker in 1956 and in 1958 was a guest challenger on the TV panel show "To Tell the Truth." He received the American Horse Shows Association's Devereux Sportsman of the Year award in 1976 and was inducted into the Show Jumping Hall of Fame March 2003. Craven was inducted into the Madison Square Garden Hall of Fame in 1999, having his name etched in the rafters along with other "Garden Greats" from Buffalo Bill to Muhammad Ali to The Rolling Stones. USA Equestrian, the sport's national governing body, gave him its lifetime achievement award. The Craven Cup, named in his honor, is awarded annually to the horse accumulating the most points in any of the rated hunter divisions of the National Horse Show.

== Personal life and death ==
In 1930, he married Eileen Griffin who remained his wife for 50 years until her death in 1980. They resided in Cohasset, Massachusetts and wintered in Florida. Craven died in a nursing home in Guilford, Connecticut at the age of 98 in 2003.
