= British Show Pony Society =

- Abbreviation: BSPS
- Formation: 1949
- Website: www.bsps.com

The British Show Pony Society (BSPS), formed in the autumn of 1949, is an organisation which oversees affiliated show pony, hunter pony and working hunter pony competitions for children's ponies in the United Kingdom. The Society offers three scholarships each year to help young riders develop their skills, and a number of recognition awards are also made. Owners, trainers and riders of ponies entered into BSPS championship shows must all be members of the society before the date of the show in which the pony qualified (though if they have never been BSPS members before, they may become members within seven days of the qualifying show), and all ponies shown at BSPS Championship shows must be registered with the society (though for animals never registered before, registration is allowed to take place within seven days after a pony has qualified at a qualifying show). Heritage Mountain and Moorland ponies must also be registered with their own breed society.

== Organisation ==
The country is divided into 17 areas, plus Scotland and Ireland, and members join the appropriate area for where they live. Members earn points by competing at shows in their area. Each area is run under a franchise from the BSPS, and is responsible for its own funding, from which it has to cover organisation of all BSPS events within its own area.

In 2007, the BSPS united with 14 other British showing societies to create the Showing Council, an organization to represent the societies with the British Equestrian Federation.

The showing of horses and ponies is widespread around the UK. The BSPS offers a large range of classes for the affiliated show rider or horse. Around 500 shows each year are run by the BSPS areas, with showing divided into the summer season (April to August) and the winter season (October to March) which consists of competitions mainly aimed at novice ponies, with each season having its own championships. The summer season championships are usually held in August, and the winter season championships in April.

=== Rules ===
Ponies must be four years of age or over (age taken from 1 January of the year in which it was born), and riders must be a minimum of three years of age. Each separate class has its own entry requirements for age and height of pony, and for age of rider.

Stallions may not be shown in any class other than the Heritage Mountain and Moorland, part-bred Arab, and Anglo-Arab classes. Mares who have foaled in the current year may not be shown in any class at all.

=== Show Tack, Turnout and Clothing ===
Novice ponies and ponies for young children must be shown in simple snaffle bridles, and non-novice working hunter and heritage ponies for older children may be shown in any suitable bridle, though a double bridle or a pelham bit is most often used. A Rugby pelham, which, with its separate loose rings imitating the double bridle, is preferred by many as it removes the necessity for a pony to have two bits in its mouth. In the working hunter and non-jumping hunter pony classes it is considered more 'correct' for ponies to be shown in plain leather 'hunt type' bridles, while fancy browbands are used in children's riding pony classes.

The correct dress for riders includes a hat which meets the current approved safety standards, riding jacket (tweed is considered the appropriate jacket for showing Heritage Mountain and Moorland ponies and hunter ponies, with a dark showing jacket for children's riding ponies), shirt and tie or stock, and breeches with long boots or jodhpurs with jodhpur boots.

All ponies apart from the Heritage Mountain and Moorland ponies must have their manes plaited, with tails either plaited or neatly pulled.

== Qualifications and examinations ==
The BSPS, in conjunction with the British Horse Society, run a number of examinations each year in which people can qualify to become a Show Groom, an Assistant Trainer, or an Accredited Trainer. The society also has an "Accredited Yard" scheme. It also has qualifiers for RIHS and HOYS
