= Landais pony =

Breed of horse

Landais
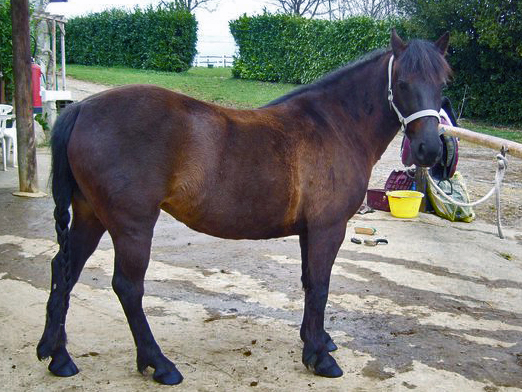

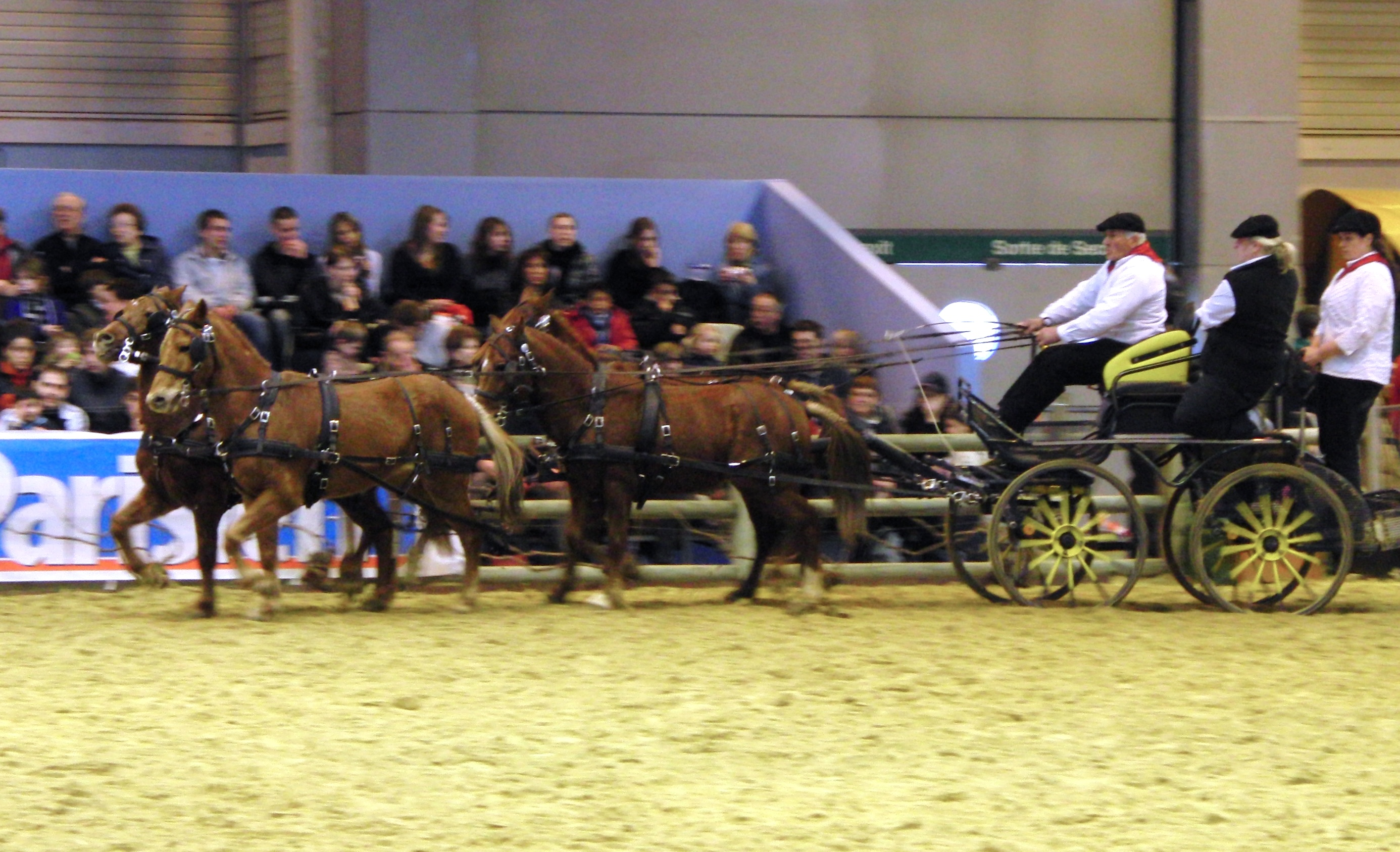
- At the Salon International de l'Agriculture in 2010
- Conservation status: FAO (2007): critically endangered; DAD-IS (2025): at risk/endangered
- Other names: Poney des Landes; Poney des Pins; Barthais; Lédon
- Country of origin: France
- Distribution: principally Nouvelle-Aquitaine
- Standard: Haras Nationaux (page 7, in French)
- Use: riding horse

Traits
- Height: 118–148 cm
- Colour: bay in various shades; black; chestnut/liver chestnut; seal brown; chocolate

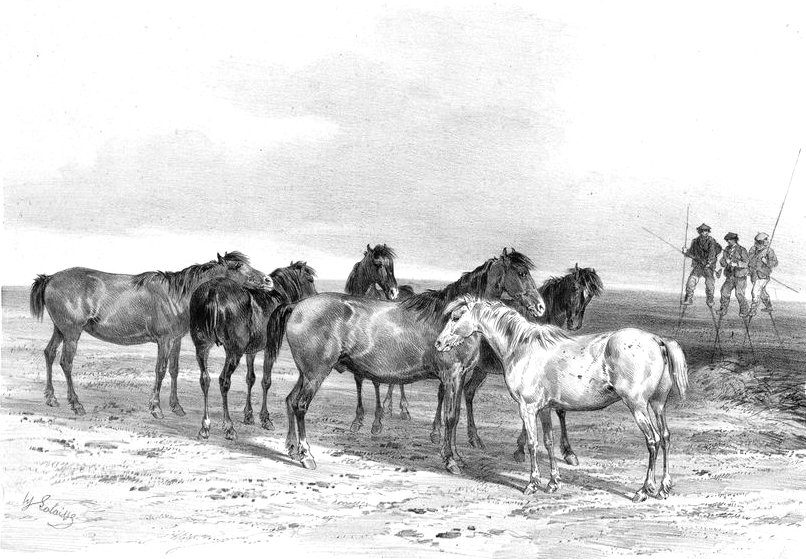
Landais horses in about 1850, engraving by François Hippolyte Lalaisse; typical Landais stilt-walkers are visible in the background

The Landais is an endangered French breed of small horse or pony. It originated in the marshy plains and woodlands of the département of the Landes, in the Nouvelle-Aquitaine region of south-western France, but is more often reared in the département of Pyrénées-Atlantiques, particularly in the arrondissement of Pau. Due to influences from Arab and Welsh blood, it shows more similarity to Oriental horses than to other Celtic breeds. It is used for riding and driving, and is a good trotter.

== History ==
Traditionally, two distinct types of pony or small horse lived in a feral or semi-feral state in the Landes de Gascogne region of south-western France: the Lédon or Poney des Pins in the sandy coastal areas of the Gironde and the Haute-Lande; and the Barthais in the Barthes de l'Adour, the marshy meadowlands of the valley of the Adour river.

The plantation of the Landes forest and associated swamp drainage operations in the nineteenth century reduced the natural range of these horses. In 1913 the two populations totalled some 2000. The advent of motorised transport led to a decline in the number of animals, both because their usefulness was reduced and because some were the cause of road accidents; during the Second World War, some fell victim to land-mines laid by German forces to prevent coastal landings. After the War, no more than 150 head remained. The Poney des Pins became extinct in about 1950.

Recovery of the breed – which now consisted only of the Barthais type – began in 1967, and a stud-book for the Landais was established in that year. To reduce the effects of inbreeding, some use was made of stallions of Arab and Welsh (Section B) types.

In 2007 the conservation status of the Landais was listed by the Food and Agriculture Organization of the United Nations as "critically endangered"; in 2014 the total number reported for the breed was 159. Annual births are low: between 2006 and 2013 the number ranged from 36 to 66.

A genetic study of French horse breeds in 2008 suggested that, to maximise genetic diversity among the French horse population, conservation priority be given to the Landais and four other breeds.

Some Landais ponies live in a semi-feral state with other livestock and wildlife on the banks of the Adour and Luy rivers in the area of Dax in the Landes, but the largest number is found in the arrondissement of Pau, in the département of Pyrénées-Atlantiques. Others are reared elsewhere in Nouvelle-Aquitaine, and in the Auvergne-Rhône-Alpes, Centre-Val de Loire, Occitanie and Pays de la Loire regions.

== Characteristics ==
The Landais shows more similarity to Oriental horses than to Celtic breeds. Arab influence can be seen in the head, while the small upright ears are from the Welsh heritage. The legs are fine, the shoulders sloped, and the rump sloping and single. The mane is full, as is the tail, which is carried high. The colours are bay, black, chestnut, liver chestnut, seal brown and chocolate; White markings to the face and legs are permitted.

== Use ==
The Landais is used as a riding horse – often by children – for hacking out and trekking, and in competition sports such as jumping, eventing and dressage. It is an excellent trotter, and is used in trotting races and in competitive driving; a Landais named Jongleur holds the trotting record for the 100-kilometre (62 mi) run between Paris and Chartres.

The Landais was among the breeds used in the creation of the Poney Français de Selle or French Riding Pony.
