= Ringmaster (horse show) =

A horse show ringmaster, sometimes also called a ring steward, is an individual who works in the center of an arena at a horse show and carries out many duties to assist the judge and other officials. Unlike a Horse show steward or the judge, the ringmaster is not a licensed official of the show. At the biggest shows, the ringmaster may be a paid employee of the show, but at smaller shows is apt to be a volunteer.

In a few competitions, usually national championships or other shows of national importance, the ringmaster may be colorfully attired in a manner similar to the ringmaster of a circus or the bugler at a horse race. In such cases, this official wears a top hat (or hunting cap for hunting and jumping classes), white jodhpurs, and scarlet ("pink") guard coat. More commonly, at ordinary horse shows, the ringmaster will simply wear neat clothing and comfortable shoes, similar to the attire of the judge.

Rarer still, is the practice of having the ringmaster summon each class of exhibitors and horses, usually by blowing a trumpet, fox horn, or carriage or coach horn. More commonly, the show announcer simply performs the task, simply calling each class by number and title over the public address system.

The duties and responsibilities of a ringmaster of a horse show varies by discipline and geographical region. These can include:

- summoning the class;
- keeping the show running smoothly and listening to the judge. The ringmaster does not help to judge the class in any way;
- policing the ring by being alert to safety issues and watching the horses, riders or drivers;
- passing communications from the judge to the announcer to call for specific gaits in a class, for the line up, etc.;
- transmitting the judges' cards to the scorers or the announcer;
- acting as a scribe (trail or reining usually);
- restraining an unruly horse (they should be physically able horsemen), helping a rider or driver that is in trouble, etc.;
- serving as a timer when a shoe has been thrown during a class and a specified time is allowed to find and have the farrier replace the shoe;
- working with ring crew for each class set up;
- pinning ribbons or distributing ribbons to winners;
- supporting the steward(s) in identifying questionable equipment and attire.

In Tennessee, the ringmaster has a legal duty under cruelty to animals statutes to disqualify and report to authorities certain animal abuses.

Some notable individuals who have served long careers as ringmasters in the United States include Dutch White, Honey Craven, Vincent Wholey, and Paul Copanas.
