= Wolkentanz =

Hanoverian horse

- Wolkentanz I
- Breed: Hanoverian
- Discipline: Dressage
- Sire: Weltmeyer
- Grandsire: World Cup I
- Dam: SPS Lovely
- Maternal grandsire: Ludendorff
- Sex: Stallion
- Foaled: 1991
- Died: 2010
- Country: Germany
- Color: Chestnut
- Breeder: Gerd Lühr
- Owner: Celle State Stud

Wolkentanz (1991 – 15 October 2010), also known as Wolkentanz I, was a champion Hanoverian stallion who stood at stud at the Celle State Stud in Germany. He was noted as a leading sire of dressage horses.

== Background ==
Wolkentanz was bred by Gerd Lühr, and foaled in Borgholzhausen in 1991. He was chestnut in colour and stood 16.1 hands (65 inches, 165 cm) at maturity.

The sire of Wolkentanz, Weltmeyer, was a major influence on the Hanoverian breed. He had been champion stallion at the Verden licensing in 1986 and won the 1987 performance test at Adelheidsdorf as well as being named the top three-year-old. Ultimately, Weltmeyer was named the Hanoverian Stallion of the Year in 1998 and his offspring included 70 licensed stallions.

As a young horse, Wolkentanz was noted for having correct conformation, but he was considered a bit small in height for a warmblood. However, he was also recognized for having excellent gaits. He changed ownership two times and was owned by a youth rider prior to his stallion evaluation. Following the evaluation, the evaluator, Burchard Bade of the Celle State Stud, obtained the young stallion for the Celle program.

== Accomplishments ==
In 1993, as a two-year-old, Wolkentanz was named champion at the Verden Stallion Licensing. In 1994, he was named Champion Three-Year-Old Riding Horse at the Federal Championships of German Riding Horses. In 1995, at age four, Wolkentanz completed the stallion performance test with an overall score of 133.78 and was rated the best stallion of his age group. In 1996 he was Reserve Champion (Bundeschampion), ridden by Ole Köhler. He became known as a performance horse at Celle as part of the Celle Dressage Quadrille, recognized for having a very good-quality trot.

Wolkentanz became known as one of the best sires of dressage horses in Germany. Among his many offspring, he produced 21 colts who became licensed stallions, five ranked Premium, and 102 mares that were rated as States' Premium. In 2005, the Deutsche Reiterliche Vereinigung (German Equestrian Federation) gave him a Breeding Value Index of 157 points, and a 97% heritability rating. His dressage breeding value was also very high, at 152.

He was stabled at Aurich when he became ill and was taken to an equine hospital. There he had to be euthanized on 14 October 2010, due to an ulcer that led to an intestinal perforation. The Celle State Stud issued a statement at the time of his death, saying, "Wolkentanz was of great significance as [a] foundation sire at the State Stud."

As of 2014 the progeny of Wolkentanz had won over €497,252 in prize money. He also had a younger full brother, named Wolkentanz II, who was exported to Canada in 2009 and died in 2015. Additional crosses of Weltmeyer and SPS Lovely also produced two full sisters, Weiße Rose and Wolkentänzerin.

Pedigree of Wolkentanz
| Sire Weltmeyer | World Cup I | Woermann | Woehler |
| Sire Weltmeyer | World Cup I | Woermann | Mandat |
| Sire Weltmeyer | World Cup I | Sendernixe | Sender |
| Sire Weltmeyer | World Cup I | Sendernixe | Lunenixe |
| Sire Weltmeyer | SPS Anka | Absatz† | Abglanz |
| Sire Weltmeyer | SPS Anka | Absatz† | Landmoor |
| Sire Weltmeyer | SPS Anka | Adelsbuch | Adorno |
| Sire Weltmeyer | SPS Anka | Adelsbuch | Dompoesie |
| Dam SPS Lovely | Ludendorff | Lugano I | Der Löwe |
| Dam SPS Lovely | Ludendorff | Lugano I | Altwunder |
| Dam SPS Lovely | Ludendorff | Alexa | Absatz† |
| Dam SPS Lovely | Ludendorff | Alexa | Gebinde |
| Dam SPS Lovely | SPS Artige | Aristides | Anteil |
| Dam SPS Lovely | SPS Artige | Aristides | Wanderin |
| Dam SPS Lovely | SPS Artige | Feurige | Furioso II |
| Dam SPS Lovely | SPS Artige | Feurige | Agram Stute |

† denotes inbreeding
