= Show hunter (British) =

Horse type in UK

A show hunter correctly plaited and wearing an appropriately "workmanlike" double bridle.

The show hunter is a type of show horse commonly seen at equestrian events across Britain. The British "show hunter" is shown primarily on the flat, while the "working hunter" must also jump a series of rustic fences (see also the horses called "show hunters" in the USA).

The governing body that oversees show hunter horses is Sport Horse Breeding (GB), formerly the Hunter Improvement Society.

Horses competing in SHB(GB) affiliated ridden and in-hand hunter classes must be registered with Sport Horse (GB). Horses competing in unaffiliated classes do not need to be registered.

Show hunter ponies are overseen by the British Show Pony Society (BSPS).

== Show hunter horses ==
=== Weight sections ===
Show hunter horses are divided into three weight sections - lightweight, middleweight and heavyweight. The lightweight hunter should be able to carry up to 12 st 7 lb (79 kg), stand around 16 to 16.2 hands (64 to 66 inches, 163 to 168 cm) and have about 8 1/2 inches of bone under the knee. The middleweight hunter stands around 16.3 hands (67 inches, 170 cm), can carry between 12 st 7 lb (79 kg) and 14 st (89 kg) and has 8 3/4 to 9 inches of bone. The heavyweight stands around 17 hands (68 inches, 173 cm), has 9 inches of bone under the knee and is capable of carrying over 14 st (89 kg).

=== Other sections ===
A small hunter horse at a horse show in the UK

In addition to the three weight sections, hunters may compete in small hunter, ladies' hunter or working hunter classes. The small hunter must look like a "miniature middleweight". The maximum height is 15.2 hands (62 inches, 157 cm), and small hunters should have relatively short legs with a deep body. The ladies' hunter may be small, lightweight, middleweight or heavyweight, and should be ridden sidesaddle. It should have an elegant appearance, perfect manners and give a smooth ride.

=== Turnout ===
Show hunter horses should be shown with manes plaited (braided) and ears, faces and legs trimmed. Between nine and 13 plaits is traditional, although the number may vary depending on the horse's conformation. Tails may be pulled or plaited, although most professionals prefer to pull. Tack should be workmanlike, with bridles having a flat noseband and plain browband. Handlers should wear tweed jackets, shirt and tie, buff or canary breeches and black leather boots with garter straps.

=== Movement ===
Show hunters should have a straight, ground-covering movement with little knee action. They should be able to show a good gallop, and come back to canter when asked. The horse should have straight, "daisy cutter" or "pointed toe" movement - "flicky toes" are a fault that suggests a horse has been schooled using artificial aids such as draw reins, and too much knee action is discouraged.

== Working hunters ==
Working hunters can be of any of the weight classes, but are expected to jump a course of natural-looking fences in addition to performing the usual short show on the flat.

Working hunter tack also varies from traditional rules. Martingales, flash nosebands and grackle nosebands are permitted, although in the event of a tie-break, the horse wearing more traditional, simple tack will win. Plain black or brown boots are allowed in the jumping phase only. Riders may wear body protectors in the jumping phase only.

== Show hunter ponies ==
Show hunter pony classes were first introduced in 1984. Ponies are shown in height classes - up to 12 hands (48 inches, 122 cm) 12 to 13 hands (48 to 52 inches, 122 to 132 cm), 13 to 14 hands (52 to 56 inches, 132 to 142 cm), and 14 to 15 hands (56 to 60 inches, 142 to 152 cm).

Ponies over 148 cm but under 158 cm may enter Intermediate Show Hunter Type classes, which are open to riders under the age of 25.

Turnout is the same as for show hunter horses, and show hunter ponies are expected to show the same paces as their larger counterparts, with the exception of lead rein and first ridden competitors, who do not show the gallop.

== See also ==
- Show hack
- Horse show
- Equestrianism
- Show hunter (USA)
