= Equestrian Canada =

National governing body of equestrian sports in Canada

- Sport: Equestrianism
- Abbreviation: EC
- Founded: 1977
- Affiliation: International Equestrian Federation, Canadian Olympic Committee, Canadian Paralympic Committee
- Headquarters: Ottawa, Ontario
- Location: Canada
- President: Todd Walsh
- CEO: Meg Krueger
- Sponsor: Agriculture Canada, Canadian Olympic Committee, Canadian Paralympic Committee, Own the Podium, Sport Canada

Official website
- www.equestrian.ca
- (Canada)

Equestrian Canada (French: Canada Équestre), formerly known as Equine Canada and commonly known by its acronym, EC, is Canada’s comprehensive national governing body for equestrian sport. It is the executive branch of Canada's Olympic and Paralympic equestrian teams; the national association and registry of Canadian equestrian athletes; the national regulatory body for equestrian coaches, competition organizers, and judges; and the national federation of Canadian horse breeders and Canadian breed registries.

In this role, EC governs Canada's official relations with the International Federation for Equestrian Sports (FEI), as well as Canada's equestrian relations with the International Olympic Committee (IOC) and the International Paralympic Committee. It also governs relations between the government of Canada and Canadian equestrian athletes and professionals.

== Equestrian sport in Canada ==
EC governs eight FEI disciplines: dressage, driving, endurance, eventing, reining, show jumping, Para-equestrian, and vaulting. Two of the FEI disciplines have remained independent of EC: horseball and tent pegging.

EC also governs the following non-FEI disciplines: hunt seat, pony club sports, saddle seat, and some breed-specific sports. It does not regulate the non-FEI disciplines of classical dressage, horse racing, polo, or rodeo sports.

The organization serves recreational riders by certifying riding coaches and instructors, publishing national riding tests and standards, and encouraging public participation in horse sports.

EC acts as the representative of Canada's horse breeders and breeding registries to Canada's federal government. It also promotes Canadian-bred horses internationally.

== History ==
EC was created through the merger of the Canadian Equestrian Federation (CEF), which governed domestic equestrianism, and the Canadian Equestrian Team (CET), which represented Canada in international competition. The CEF was itself the result of an earlier merger between the National Equestrian Federation of Canada, the national domestic equestrian sport organisation, and the Canadian Horse Council, the national equestrian industry association.

The organisation changed its name and logo in June 2016 in an effort to clarify its mandate to the horse community and the general public.

=== History of Hunt Seat ===
Hunt seat's roots were first founded in Europe when hunting for game. Dogs were used to aide the horsemen in navigating the prey. Unpredictable terrain of the countryside deemed horses necessary to manoeuvre creeks, ditches, walls and fences. Although the sport of hunt seat began as recreational, the working hunter soon became more refined and competitive, in which the show hunter became.

== Long-Term Equestrian Development Model ==
The Long-Term Equestrian Development Model (LTED 2.0) was created as a basis for developing young athletes and improving horsemanship between horse and rider. The LTED 2.0 uses the Long-Term Athlete Development (LTAD) model, created by Sport for Life Society, in which is applied to the equestrian sport. The LTED 2.0 model is available for free download on the Equestrian Canada website, equestrian.ca. The LTED 2.0 model looks to create a clear route for equestrian athletes to follow, whether they look to compete at the top level, or ride recreationally.

=== LTED 2.0 Stages ===
The LTED 2.0 model maps out the pathway in the equestrian sport for both able-bodied athletes as well as athletes with a disability. The stages in which the athlete is in depends on the development of their physical, mental and social skills. The first four stages in the LTED 2.0 model are Active Start, FUNdamental, Learn to Train, and Train to Train. The next four stages in the model are considered the "high-performance" stages; Learn to Compete, Train to Compete, Learn to Win, and Train to Win. These stages depend on the continued improvement and competitive success.

== USHJA Hunter Derby Program ==
The USHJA (United States Hunter/Jumper Program) Hunter Derby Program was created to improve and encourage horsemanship within the hunter disciplines. The USHJA Hunter Derby Program offers three types of derbies; the Pony Derby, National Derby, and International Derby. Each class shows at a different height and poses a different challenge to the horses and riders competing. Each derby class offers prize money ranging from $2,500 to $280,000 USD.

=== Format ===
The hunter derbies consist of two rounds. The first round is a classic round judged on "quality, movement, jumping style, manners and way of going, with pace and brilliance rewarded. Bonus points are given for higher fence options". The second round, better known as the Handy Hunter round, is judged with the same criteria as the classic round, but with extra points given for efficiency, a handy track, and higher jump options.

=== Pony Derby ===
The Pony Derby, much like the horse derby, follows the same criteria and judging in the Classic and Handy Hunter rounds. However, the fence heights differs for the pony size. "If it is a small pony, the fence height is 2’3, the medium ponies jump 2’6, and large ponies jump 2’9 to 3’0. Also, there are no high option fences".

=== National Hunter Derby ===
The National Hunter Derby encourages horses and riders of all experience to take on the challenging tracks. The fences are set at 3', with high options set at 3'5. Each round includes four high option fences. After all riders have ridden the track in the Classic round, only the top 12 riders are invited back to challenge round two, the Handy Hunter round. Once both round are complete, the judges calculate the sum of both scores to create an overall score.

=== International Hunter Derby ===
Much like the Pony Derby and National derby, the International Derby consists of a Classic and Handy Hunter round. Some shows choose to have both rounds run in one day, while others choose to have the Classic run on one day, and the Handy Hunter on another. A jog is also included in this class to ensure the soundness of the horses. "The fence heights range for 3’6 to 4’0 with the high option at 4’3 or higher. 50% or less of the fences need to be set at 3’6". International derbies consist of four judges in two separate booths.

== Recent results ==
EC's teams at the 2008 Olympics won one gold and one silver medal. EC's team at the 2008 Paralympics also won one gold and one silver medal. This represents the highest Canadian equestrian achievement at any Summer Games in the history of the Olympic movement.

== Controversies ==
Damagingly in a bilingual and multicultural country, the sport has been portrayed in certain media as being controlled by white, anglophone, "old boys and girls," for whom money is more important than talent or good sportsmanship. However, an industry survey performed in 2010 determined that active participants were 79% female, aged 50 – 59, living in households of two or more adults with a median household income of $60,000 - $80,000. This same study determined that horse use by these individuals was partitioned equally among recreation, sport and breeding.

EC has supported the Canadian horse slaughter industry, which has caused conflict with Canadian horse welfare advocates, who accuse it of encouraging practices that cause unacceptable suffering to horses.

At the 2012 Summer Olympics, EC's then president Michael Gallagher issued a press release thanking the FEI after it had disqualified Canadian showjumping rider Tiffany Foster under controversial circumstances. Public reaction to the press release was overwhelmingly negative: Canada's 2008 Olympic Gold Medalist Eric Lamaze threatened to quit Canada's equestrian team in protest, and some media outlets went so far as to suggest that Gallagher not be allowed to return to Canada. It was later discovered that at the time of the release, Gallagher was on a plane landing in Canada and he had never seen the final version of the release before it was issued. EC quickly issued a "clarification" on Gallagher's press release.
