= Riding pony =

Horse show class for ponies

Riding pony is a horse show classification used to refer to certain types of ponies. Competition is divided into sections based on height and type, and include being judged under saddle in standard pleasure horse classes, as well as in related events such as sidesaddle or in-hand.

Riding ponies were originally developed in the United Kingdom and are now bred all over the world. Generally speaking, where the term "riding pony" is used in a competition schedule it is accepted as referring to ponies shown under saddle on the flat, as hunter ponies and driving ponies have separate classes.

== Characteristics ==
Riding ponies are conformed more like a small horse than a pony, with small heads and ears. They are compact, with sloping shoulders and a slim build. Their feet are tough and they possess strong limbs. They are well-proportioned with comfortable gaits and free-flowing movement.

There are three types:

- Show pony: the classic "show riding pony", show ponies resemble miniature show hacks with pony features, and often contain Arabian or Thoroughbred blood. Show ponies are shown in three height sections - up to 12.2 hands (50 inches, 127 cm), 12.2 to 13.2 hands (50 to 54 inches, 127 to 137 cm), and 13.2 to 14.2 hands (58 inches, 147 cm).
- Show hunter: similar to the show pony, but with more substance. The pony should be suitable to carry a child across country. Height class divisions are the same as for show ponies.
- Working hunter: stockier, more workmanlike, and expected to jump a short course of natural fences. Height class divisions are divided into over and under 13 hands (52 inches, 132 cm). Fences should be no higher than 2 feet 6 inches (0.76 m) for ponies under 13 hands high and no higher than 3 feet (0.91 m) for ponies over 13 hands.

== History ==
Children's ponies in Britain were originally of native varieties, now the Mountain and Moorland pony breeds, used for riding and hunting. When pony classes were added to horse shows in the early 1920s, breeders began crossing Welsh and Dartmoor ponies with small Thoroughbred and Arabian horses. From the 1930s into the 1950s, Arabian blood was again introduced to improve stamina and refinement, which included one of the most influential sires, Naseel. The result was an elegant, but small, animal that is now seen in the show ring.

In 1893, The Polo Pony Stud Book was formed, encouraging the breeding of fine riding and polo ponies. By 1899, there were over 100 stallions and 600 mares registered, almost half of which were native ponies. The society changed its name in 1903 to Polo Pony and Riding Pony Stud book, and again in 1913 to the National Pony Society. Over the years, the native breeds formed their own societies, and the NPS became dedicated to British riding ponies. Since 1994, foreign-bred ponies were placed on a separate register.

== Standardized breeds ==
The general riding pony group has developed, aside from various British crossbreeds, into several standardized breeds, including the Australian Riding Pony, Belgian Riding Pony, Czechoslovakian Small Riding Pony, German Riding Pony, poney français de Selle (developed in the 1970s in France, and said to be a more all-around, less-refined type), Pony of the Americas (developed in the United States in the 1950s), and four specific Welsh pony varieties.
