= Horse show =

Judged exhibition of horses

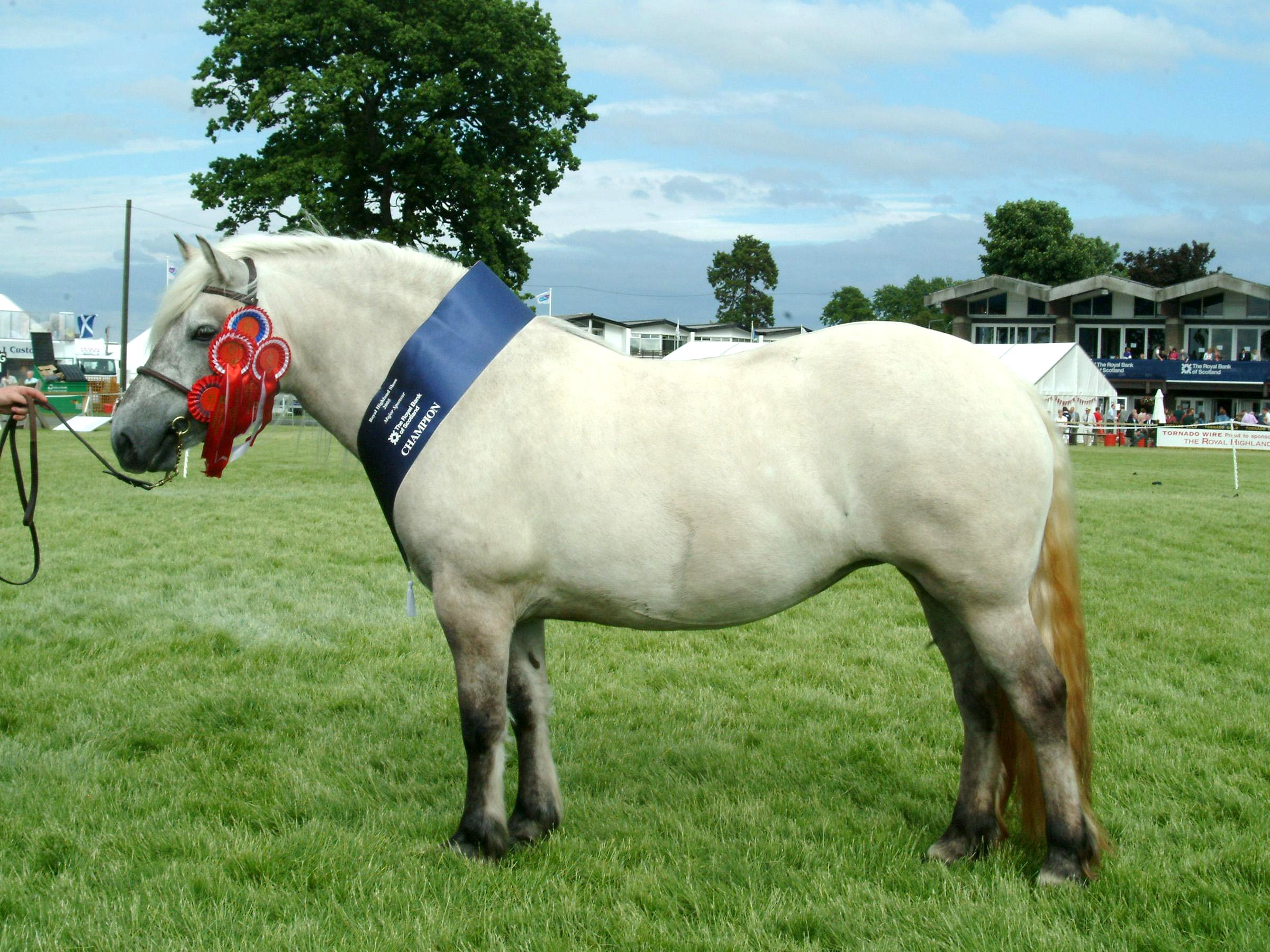
A winning pony at a horse show

A horse show is a judged exhibition of horses and ponies. Many different horse breeds and equestrian disciplines hold competitions worldwide, from local to the international levels. Most horse shows run from one to three days, sometimes longer for major, all-breed events or national and international championships. Most shows consist of a series of different performances, called classes, wherein a group of horses with similar training or characteristics compete against one another for awards and, often, prize money.

== International organizations and competitions ==
There are several international disciplines run under rules established by the Fédération équestre internationale (FEI):

- Combined driving
- Dressage
- Endurance riding
- Eventing
- Para-equestrian
- Reining
- Show jumping
- Showmanship
- Tent pegging
- Vaulting
- Western Pleasure

The rules of the FEI govern competitions open to riders from all nations, including the Olympic games and the World Equestrian Games.

At the other end of the competition spectrum, Pony Club is an international movement that teaches young people riding skills suitable for English riding competitions. To help develop positive experience and good sportsmanship, Pony Clubs also sponsor horse shows open only to young people under the age of 18 and their horses. Various nations have similar programs for developing young equestrians, such as the 4-H program in the United States.

== Horse shows within various nations ==
=== Australia ===
Horse shows in Australia are governed by Equestrian Australia (EA), Show Horse Council of Australia and different breed societies. Much of the development of the show horse discipline (also referred to as saddle horse) was developed over the last 40 years by Fran Cleland through her involvement with the Equestrian Federation of Australia's (EFA) Victorian branch (now known as EV). Fran Cleland is the wife of Reg Cleland who was the longest serving Chairman of the Victorian branch of the EFA which was in turn responsible for running The Barastoc Horse of The Year Show the premier horse Show in Australia for over 40 years and under the direction of Fran Cleland introduced Newcomer, Show-hunter, leading rein, first ridden, owner rider and working Hunter classes into the Australian Show Horse scene.

=== Canada ===
The governing body for Equestrian activities in Canada is Equine Canada (EC).

=== United Kingdom ===
In the United Kingdom there is a distinct difference between "horse competitions" such as dressage or eventing and horse shows. Horse shows provide an opportunity for riders and owners to exhibit their animals without taking part in any of the Olympic disciplines. Classes are divided into ridden and in-hand sections and there are many different classes for different horses and ponies. For example, there are classes for mountain and moorland pony breeds, show hunters, show hacks, equitation, and show pony classes. Many clubs hold riding club classes, where a horse or pony must perform a short "show" (solo performance) and jump a single fence between 2 feet and 3 feet 3 inches. Most shows also include show jumping and working hunter sections.

The British Horse Society oversees many shows at national, regional and local level as does the Pony Club, the British Show Pony Society and the British Show Horse Association. Breed societies, particularly those related to the Welsh pony and Arabian horse, also organise their own shows. At local, unaffiliated level, riding clubs across Britain organise regular shows, which are often staffed by volunteers. The newly formed Showing Council is working towards officially overseeing all horse shows (non-FEI disciplines).

The Olympic equestrian disciplines are overseen by the British Equestrian Federation. There are several subdivisions. Dressage competitions are held separately from regular horse shows and are overseen by British Dressage, show jumping competitions are overseen by the British Showjumping Association (BSJA), and eventing is overseen by British Eventing.

=== United States ===
The United States Equestrian Federation is the American national body for equestrian sport and is also the recognized entity overseeing the Olympic-level United States Equestrian Team. It also organizes and sponsors horse shows for many horse breeds who wish to use the drug testing, judge certification and standardized rulemaking process of USEF. In addition, USEF sanctions events in disciplines and lower-level competitive areas that are not internationally recognized, such as show hunter and equitation. Other US organizations such as the National Cutting Horse Association, United States Eventing Association (USEA) and United States Dressage Federation (USDF) organize competitions for specific disciplines, such as cutting, and some breed organizations such as the American Quarter Horse Association sanction their own breed-specific shows.

Horse shows in the United States take several forms: Some are restricted to a particular breed, others are "open" or "all-breed" horse shows, which offer classes to all breeds as well as breed-specific classes for many different breeds. In the last few decades, American open horse shows have tended to become specialized by discipline into hunter-jumper or "sport horse" shows, dressage shows, and shows featuring English or Western riding events. However, there are still some multi-day, all-breed events that feature multiple breeds and disciplines.

== Types of competitions ==
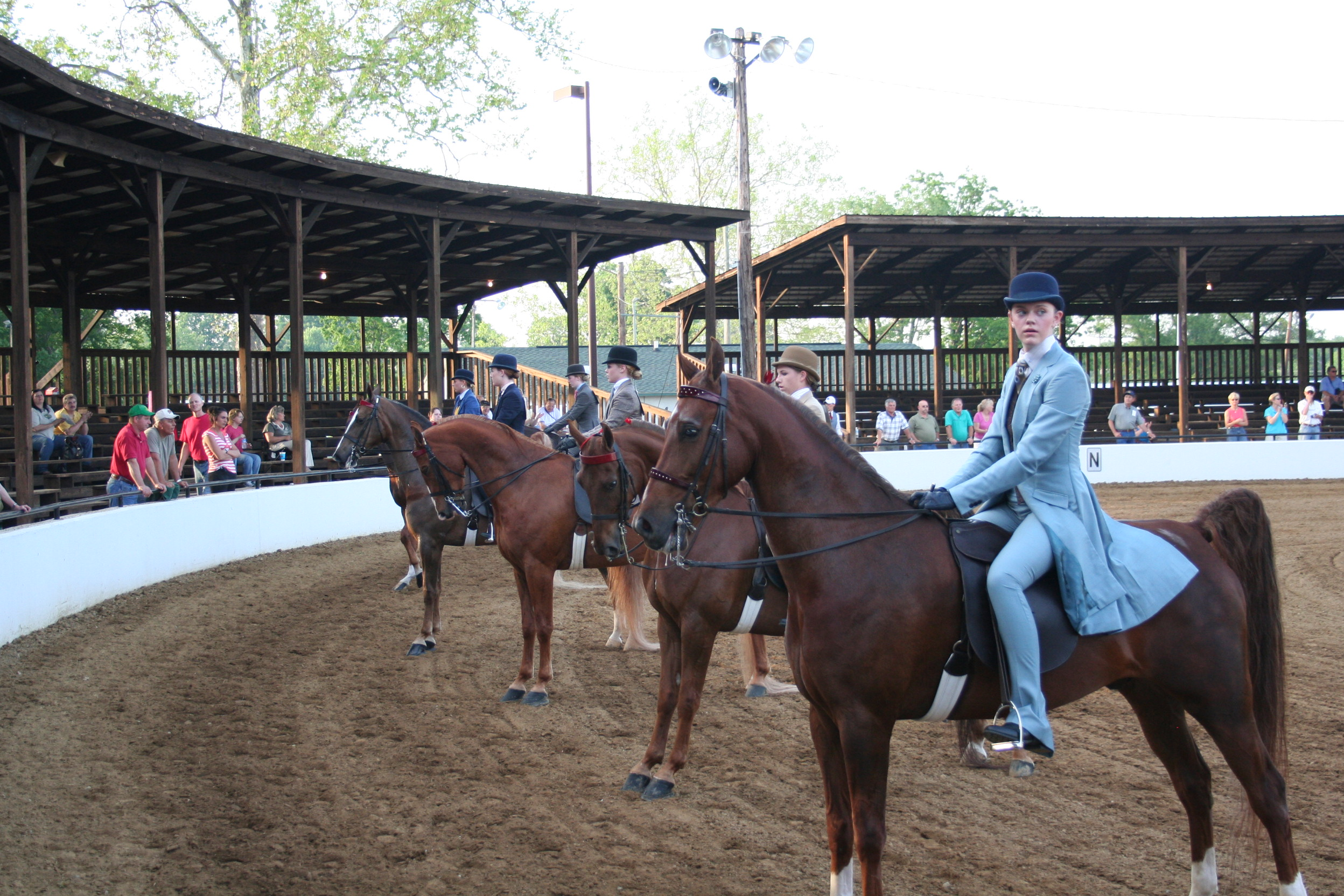
A saddle seat class lined up and awaiting awards

There are a range of competitive equestrian events available and specific offerings range widely by nation and even by region within a given country. However, in North America, most horse shows provide the following range of classes:

English riding classes fall into two primary styles, hunt seat and saddle seat. "Hunt type" or sport horse classes include dressage, show jumping and show hunters, eventing (also called horse trials), and English pleasure or Hunter Under Saddle, also known as a "flat" class, where the event is judged on presentation, manners and rideability of the horse. "Saddle seat" or "saddle type" classes are all on the flat and are variations on English Pleasure, though the high action "Park" style classes differ because they emphasize brilliant trotting action. Equitation classes judge the form and ability of the rider.

Show jumping, eventing and dressage are sometimes called "Olympic" events, because they are the equestrian sports included in the Olympic Games.

Western or stock horse competition includes working cattle events, such as cutting, team penning and working cow horse in the United States, and campdrafting in Australia. They also include "dry" classes (without cattle) that include western pleasure, reining and equitation.

There are also specialized classes for draft horse showing, and a number of events for horses and ponies driven in harness, including Fine harness classes for saddle seat-type horses, Roadster classes that use equipment similar to that of harness racing, and the FEI-sanctioned sport of combined driving. Miniature horses also have their own shows with a number of specialized classes.

Most horse shows offer Halter classes, also called "breeding", "conformation", or "in-hand" classes. In these classes horses are led without saddles, not ridden, judging conformation and gaits. To train young equestrians in halter showing techniques, horse showmanship classes are offered. They are the halter equivalent of equitation because the handler, not the horse, is judged.

Classes may be broken down by the age of horse or rider, by the number of first place ribbons earned by horse or rider, and by size or breed of horse or pony. In addition, there are numerous other regional or specialty classes that may be offered. Various types of costume classes are frequently offered; sidesaddle classes are common; a "leadline" or "walk-trot" division may be offered for small children or very inexperienced riders; and assorted "freestyle" classes, where a horse and rider perform a routine set to music, are also popular.

Rodeos and horse pulling competitions are not technically horse shows, but they are competitive equestrian events, often with a great deal of prize money. Equestrian vaulting is not usually seen at ordinary horse shows, even though it is an FEI-recognized equestrian sport. Games, such as Gymkhana or O-Mok-See competition are usually held separately from ordinary horse shows, though a few of these "speed" events may be thrown in as "fun classes", particularly at 4-H, Pony Club, and other small shows.

== Awards ==
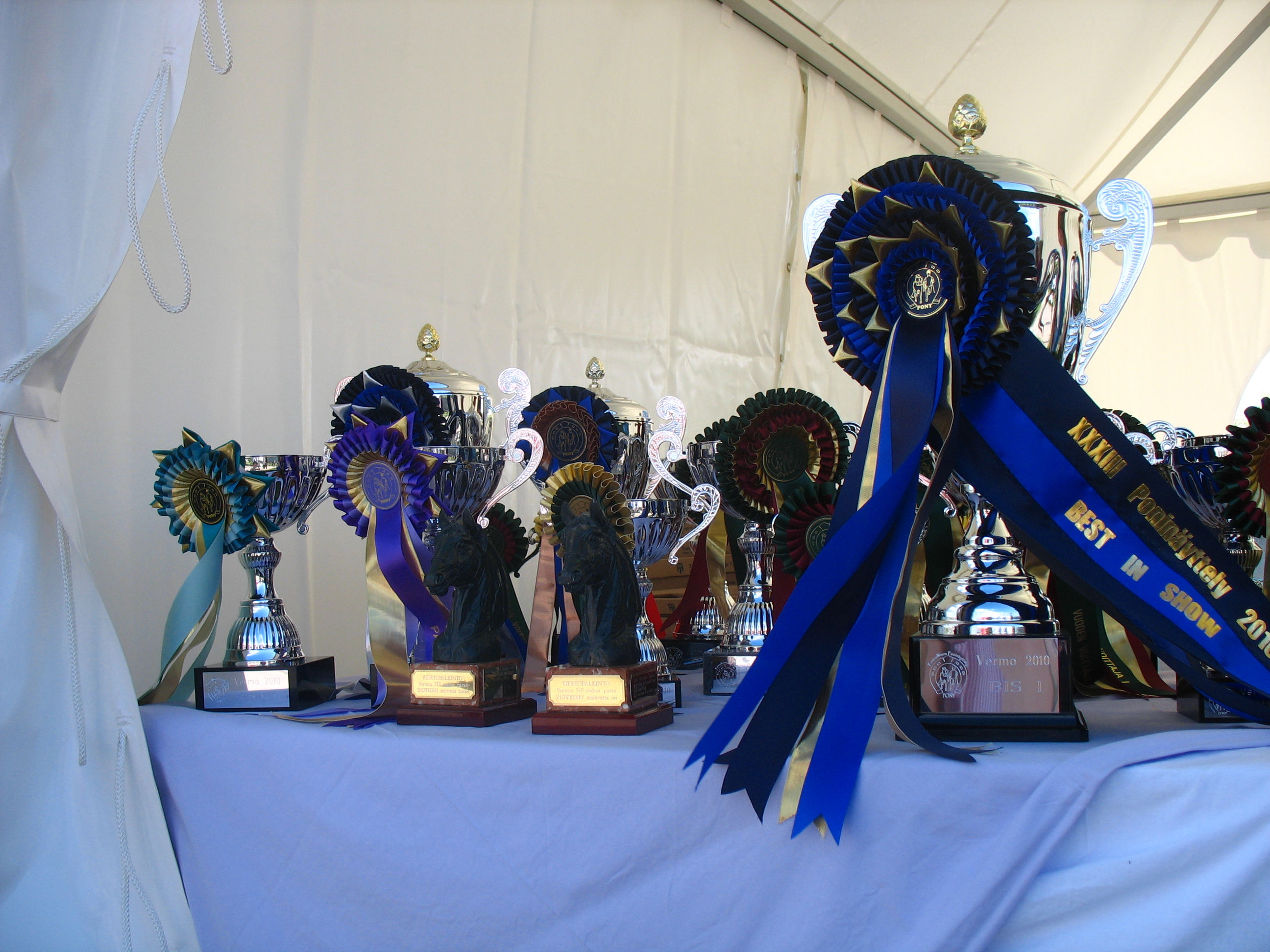
A display of trophies and rosettes at a horse show

Prize money is sometimes awarded, particularly at larger competitions. The sum varies by the placing of the rider, the prestige of the show, and the difficulty of the class. Horse shows do not offer cash purses as large as in the Thoroughbred racing industry, though a few of the biggest show jumping, cutting and reining competitions may offer purse money into the low five figures. However, most show horses in the United States, especially those at the amateur levels, rarely win significant cash prizes during their show career. At best, a solid competitor might break even on entry fees and, if they are quite lucky, cover some travel expenses. Most money made from showing horses is indirectly earned by breeding fees paid for top horses, the sale of their offspring, or from the training fees paid to top trainers.

Trophies are usually awarded to the first place horse in a class, depending on the size of the show. In a championship event, trophies may be awarded to both the champion and the reserve champion, and at a national or international show trophies are sometimes given to the top five to ten competitors.

Other types of objects, such as dishes, trays, or plates, are sometimes given out as alternates to trophies.

Medals are given at international events such as the World Equestrian Games and the Olympics. Usually only three medals—gold, silver, and bronze—are awarded to the top three individuals or teams.

Rosettes or ribbons are often given for the top placings in a class. Often ribbons are given through the top six place entries, although some of the larger shows may award ribbons to the top ten. Ribbon color varies from country to country, as shown in the following chart.

Prize Ribbon Colors
| | Australia | Canada | Czech Republic | Germany | Netherlands | New Zealand | Norway | Sweden | U.K. | United States | Olympics (medals) |
|---|---|---|---|---|---|---|---|---|---|---|---|---|
| 1st | blue | red | yellow | yellow | orange | red | red blue white | blue, yellow | red | blue | gold | 1st |
| 2nd | red | blue | white | gray | red | blue | red | blue | blue | red | silver | 2nd |
| 3rd | white | white | red | white | white | yellow | blue | yellow | yellow | yellow | bronze | 3rd |
| 4th | green | yellow | blue | blue | blue | green | green | red | green | white | blue | 4th |
| 5th | yellow | green | green | red | green | pink | yellow | green | pink | pink | red | 5th |
| 6th | brown | pink | violet | green | pink | purple | | white | purple | green | green | 6th |
| 7th | | purple | any other | green | | | | | pale green | purple | orange | 7th |
| 8th | | brown | | green | | | | | tan | brown | violet | 8th |
| 9th | | orange | | green | | | | | brown | gray | | 9th |
| 10th | | mauve | | green | | | | | gray | lt. blue | | 10th |
| Ch. | blue, red, white | red, blue, white | | ? | red, white, blue | dark purple, light purple | | | | blue, red, and yellow or solid purple | | Ch. |
| Res. Ch. | purple | blue, white, yellow | | ? | | | | | | red, yellow, and white or solid lavender | | Res. Ch. |

Champion & Reserve Champion ribbons are commonly called Tri-colors. They are usually a combination of the 1st, 2nd, & 3rd place colors for Champion and 2nd, 3rd, & 4th for Reserve Champion.

== Horse show sanctioning organizations ==
- British Show Horse Association (BSHA)
- Equestrian Australia (EA)
- Equine Canada (EC)
- Federation Equestre International (FEI)
- United States Equestrian Federation (USEF)

== See also ==
- Agricultural show
- Equestrian at the Summer Olympics
- Equestrian drill team
- Equestrianism
- Ringmaster (horse show)
- Show (animal)
