= German Riding Pony =

German breed of horse

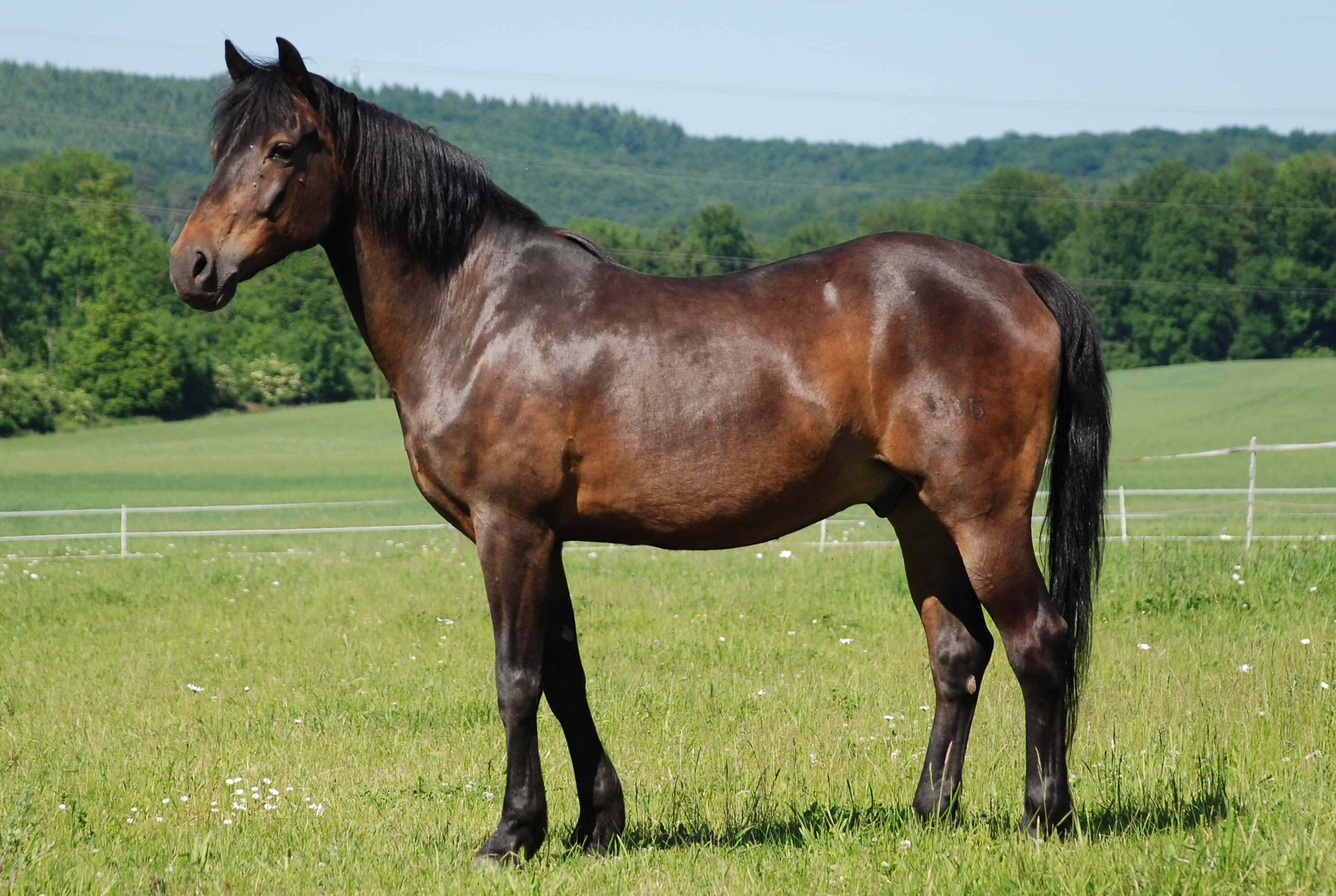

- Conservation status: FAO (2007): not at risk; DAD-IS (2024): at risk/vulnerable; BLE (2024): not endangered
- Other names: Deutsches Reitpony; Kleines Deutsches Reitpferd
- Country of origin: Germany
- Standard: Deutsche Reiterliche Vereinigung
- Use: competitive horse sports

Traits
- Height: 138–148 cm; Male: average 146 cm; Female: average 140 cm
- Colour: usually bay, black, chestnut or grey

The German Riding Pony or Deutsches Reitpony is a modern German breed of pony or small horse of warmblood type. It is a composite of several horse or pony breeds including the Anglo-Arab, the Arab, the Connemara, the Dülmener, the New Forest Pony and the Welsh Pony. These were selectively bred with the aim of developing a small athletic riding horse with the qualities of the principal German warmbloods. Heights are in the range 137–147 cm or 141–148 cm. It constitutes about 5.7% of the horse population of Germany.

== History ==
From about 1965 efforts were made to breed a German sport horse of warmblood type but of pony or small horse size. Early cross-breeding attempts to this end – such as Arab × Haflinger or Thoroughbred × Fjord – were not successful. The principal foundation stock for what would become the Deutsches Reitpony was the Welsh Pony and Cob of the British Isles, with some input from Arab, Anglo-Arab, Connemara, Dülmener and New Forest Pony stock. Breeding took place predominantly in Lower Saxony, Nordrhein-Westfalen and Schleswig-Holstein. The horses were soon seen in competitive sports at national level, and from about 1975 in international competitions also.

In the 1990s there was some further cross-breeding, this time with German warmblood sport horses such as the Hanoverian, the Holsteiner and the Trakehner; this had some positive results, but at the cost of some reduction in the pony character of the breed.

The Reitpony constitutes about 5.7% of the horse population of Germany. Between 2000 and 2025 the number of mares registered in the stud-book fell from 7825 to 5693, while the number of approved stallions rose from 92 to 198 in the same period. In the eleven years from 2015 to 2025 there were 10632 new registrations in the stud-book, an average of about 967 per year.

== Characteristics ==
The horses usually stand from 138 to 148 cm at the withers, with an average height of about 146 cm for stallions and 140 cm for mares.

The coat may be of any colour; it is usually bay, black, chestnut or grey.

== Use ==
The horses are bred for riding and recreational use, and also for tournament competition.
