= Welsh Pony and Cob =

British breed of horse

Welsh Pony
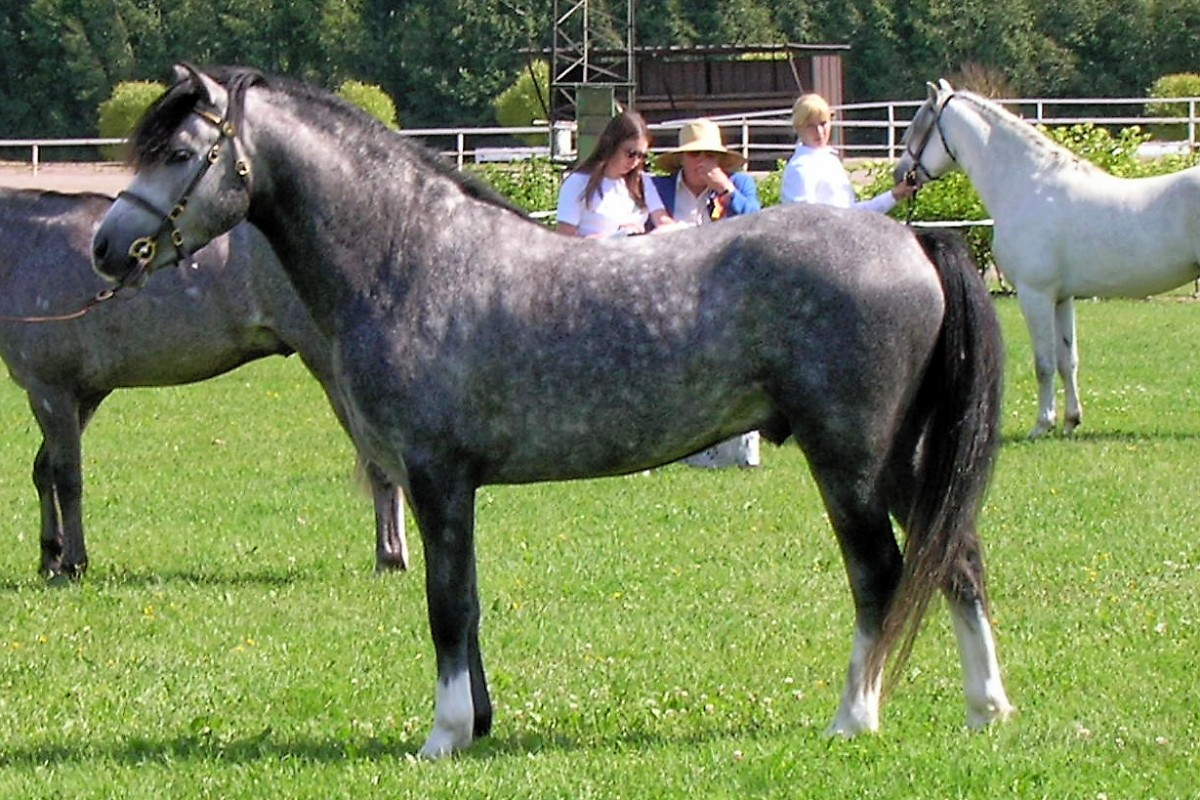
- Welsh Pony (Section B)

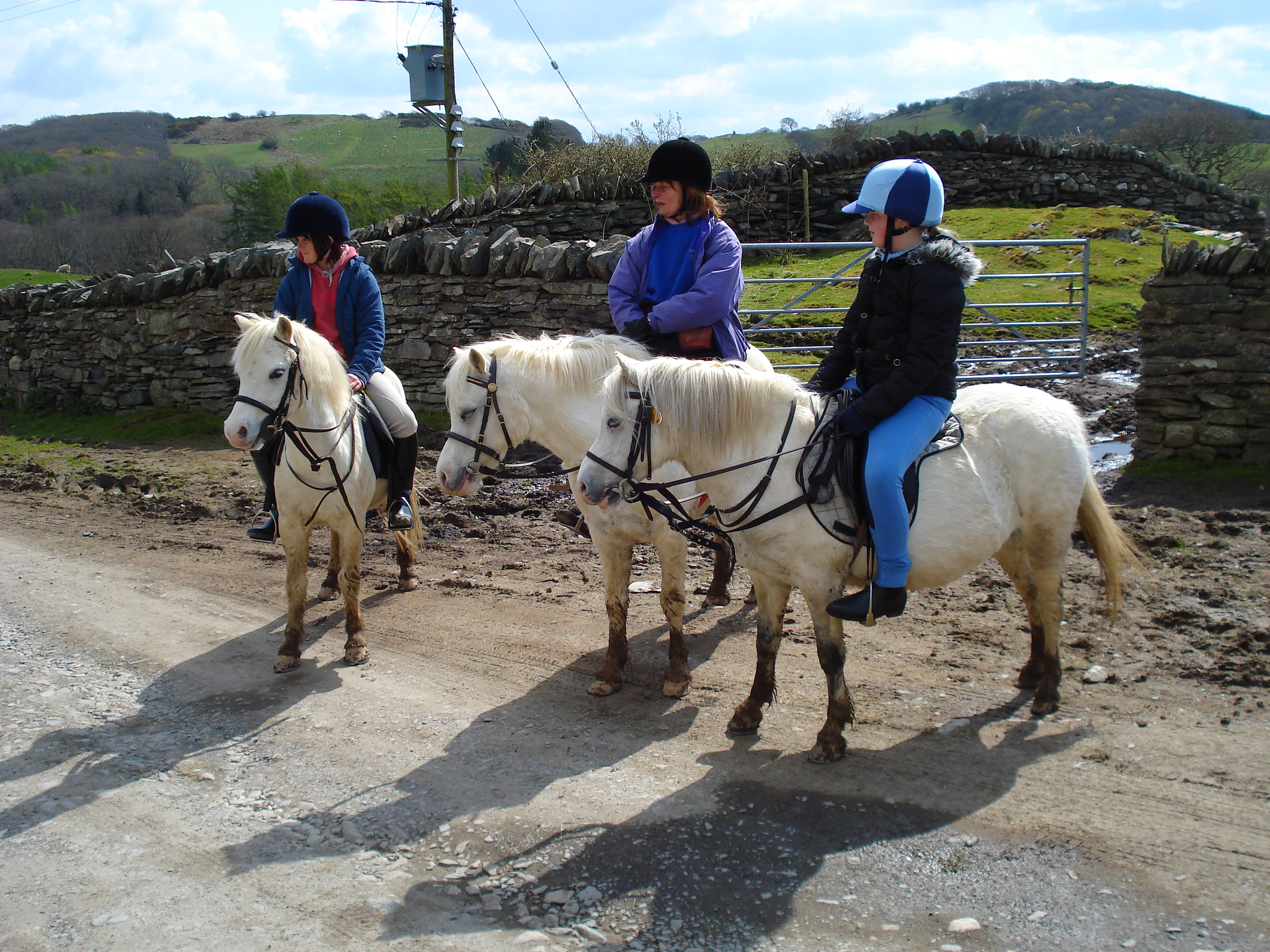
- Other names: Welsh Mountain Pony; Welsh Pony of Cob Type; Welsh Cob
- Country of origin: Wales

Traits
- Weight: Varies by section A, B, C or D
- Height: Varies by section A, B, C or D
- Distinguishing features: Hardy, sure-footed, intelligent. Refined with clean bone, with substance, stamina and soundness.

Breed standards
- Welsh Pony and Cob Society of America (WPCSA); Welsh Pony and Cob Society (WPCS)

The Welsh Pony and Cob is a group of four closely-related horse breeds including both pony and cob types, which originated in Wales. The four sections within the breed society for the Welsh breeds are primarily distinguished by height, and also by variations in type: the smallest Welsh Mountain Pony (Section A); the slightly taller but refined Welsh Pony of riding type (Section B) popular as a children's show mount; the small but stocky Welsh Pony of Cob Type (Section C), popular for riding and competitive driving; and the tallest, the Welsh Cob (Section D), which can be ridden by adults. Welsh ponies and cobs in all sections are known for their good temperament, hardiness, and free-moving gaits.

Native ponies existed in Wales before 1600 BC, and a Welsh-type cob was known as early as the Middle Ages. They were influenced by the Arabian horse, and possibly also by the Thoroughbred and the Hackney horse. In 1901, the first stud book for the Welsh breeds was established in the United Kingdom, and in 1907 another registry was established in the United States. Interest in the breed declined during the Great Depression, but revived in the 1950s. Throughout their history, the Welsh breeds have had many uses, including as a cavalry horse, a pit pony, and as a working animal on farms.

Today, the modern Welsh Pony and Cob breeds are used for many equestrian competitive disciplines, including showing, jumping, and driving, as well as for pleasure riding, trekking and trail riding. The smaller types are popular children's ponies. The Welsh also crosses well with many other breeds and has influenced the development of many British and American horse and pony breeds.

== History ==
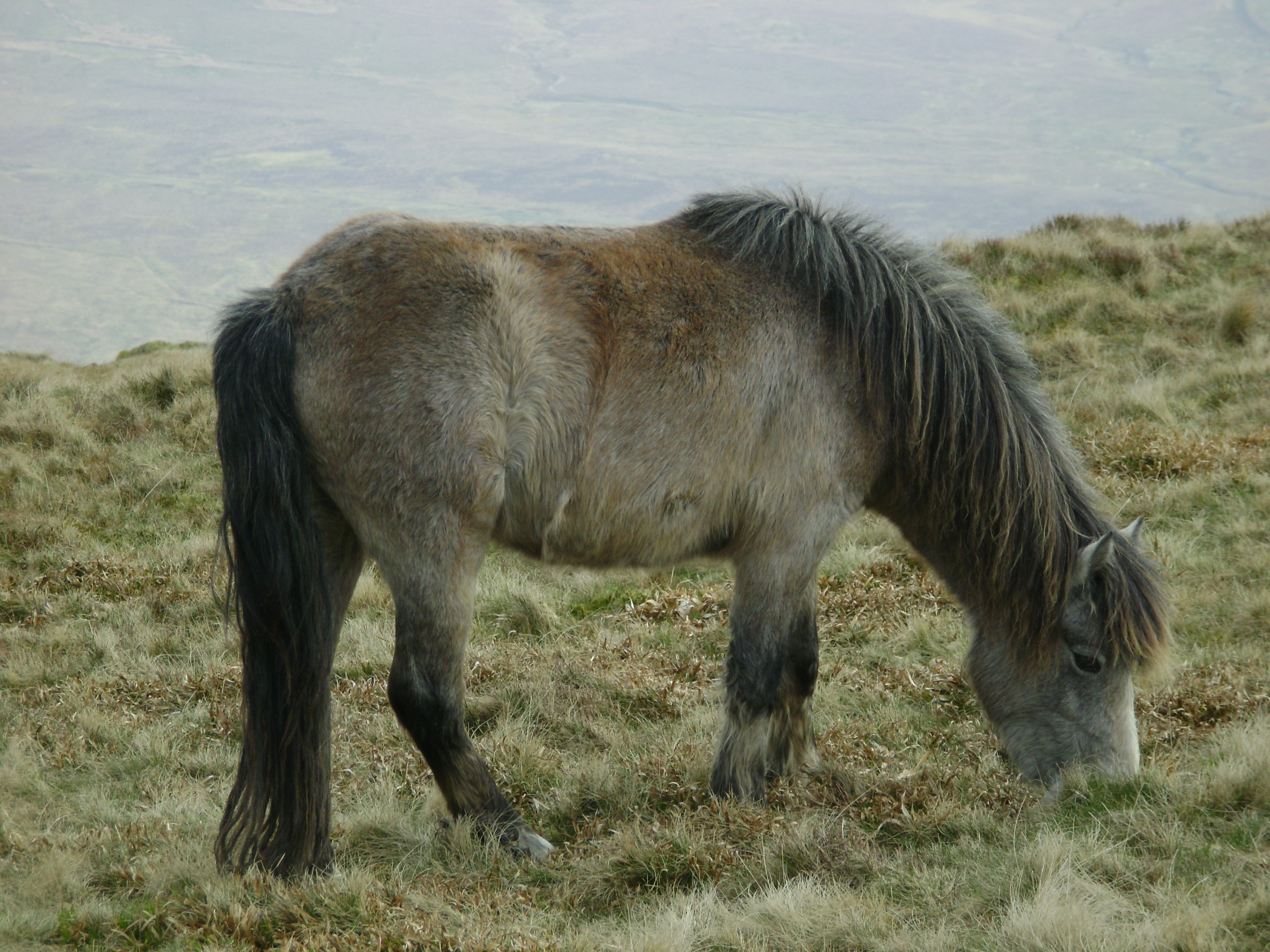
Traditional native Welsh-type pony in a natural setting; such ponies have lived in Wales for centuries

Evidence suggests that a native pony existed in Wales before 1600 BC. The original Welsh Mountain Pony is thought to have evolved from this prehistoric Celtic pony. Welsh ponies were primarily developed in Wales, and their ancestors existed in the British Isles prior to the arrival of the Roman Empire. Bands of ponies roamed in a semi-feral state, climbing mountains, leaping ravines, and running over rough moorland terrain.

They developed into a hardy breed due to the harsh climate, limited shelter, and sparse food sources of their native country. At some point in their development, the Welsh breeds had some Arab blood added, although this did not take away the physical characteristics that make the breed unique.

The Welsh Cob existed as a type as early as the Middle Ages, and mentions of such animals can be found in medieval Welsh literature. During this time, they were known for their speed, jumping ability, and carrying capacity. Before the introduction of large, "cold-blooded" draught horse breeds, they were used for farm work and timbering. In 1485 the Welsh Militia, riding local animals presumed to be ancestors of the modern Welsh Cob, assisted Henry Tudor in gaining the English throne. During the 15th century, similar small horses were also used as rounceys, leading war horses known as destriers.

The characteristics of the breed as known today are thought to have been established by the late 15th century, after the Crusaders returned to England, with Arab stallions from the Middle East. In the 16th century, King Henry VIII, thinking to improve the breeds of horses, particularly war horses, ordered the destruction of all stallions under 15 hands (60 inches, 152 cm) and all mares under 13 hands (52 inches, 132 cm) in the Breed of Horses Act 1535. The laws for swingeing culls of 'under-height' horses were partially repealed by a decree by Queen Elizabeth I in 1566 on the basis that the poor lands could not support the weight of the horses desired by Henry VIII because of "their rottenness ... [they] are not able to breed beare and bring forth such great breeds of stoned horses as by the statute of 32 Henry VIII is expressed, without peril of miring and perishing of them", and (fortunately for the future of Britain's mountain and moorland pony breeds) many ponies in their native environments, including the Welsh breeds, therefore escaped the slaughter.

On the upland farms of Wales, Welsh ponies and cobs would often have to do everything from ploughing a field to carrying a farmer to market or driving a family to services on Sunday. When coal mining became important to the economy of the British Isles, many Welsh ponies were harnessed for use in mines, above and below ground.

In the 18th century and 19th century, more Arab blood was added by stallions who were turned out in the Welsh hills. Other breeds have also been added, including the Thoroughbred, Hackney, Norfolk Roadster, and the Yorkshire Coach Horse. Before the car was developed, the quickest mode of transport in Wales was the Welsh Cob. Tradesmen, doctors, and other businessmen often selected ponies by trotting them the 35 uphill miles from Cardiff to Dowlais. The best ponies could complete this feat in under three hours, never breaking gait. Formal breeding stock licensing was introduced in 1918, but before this, breeding stock was selected by such trotting tests.

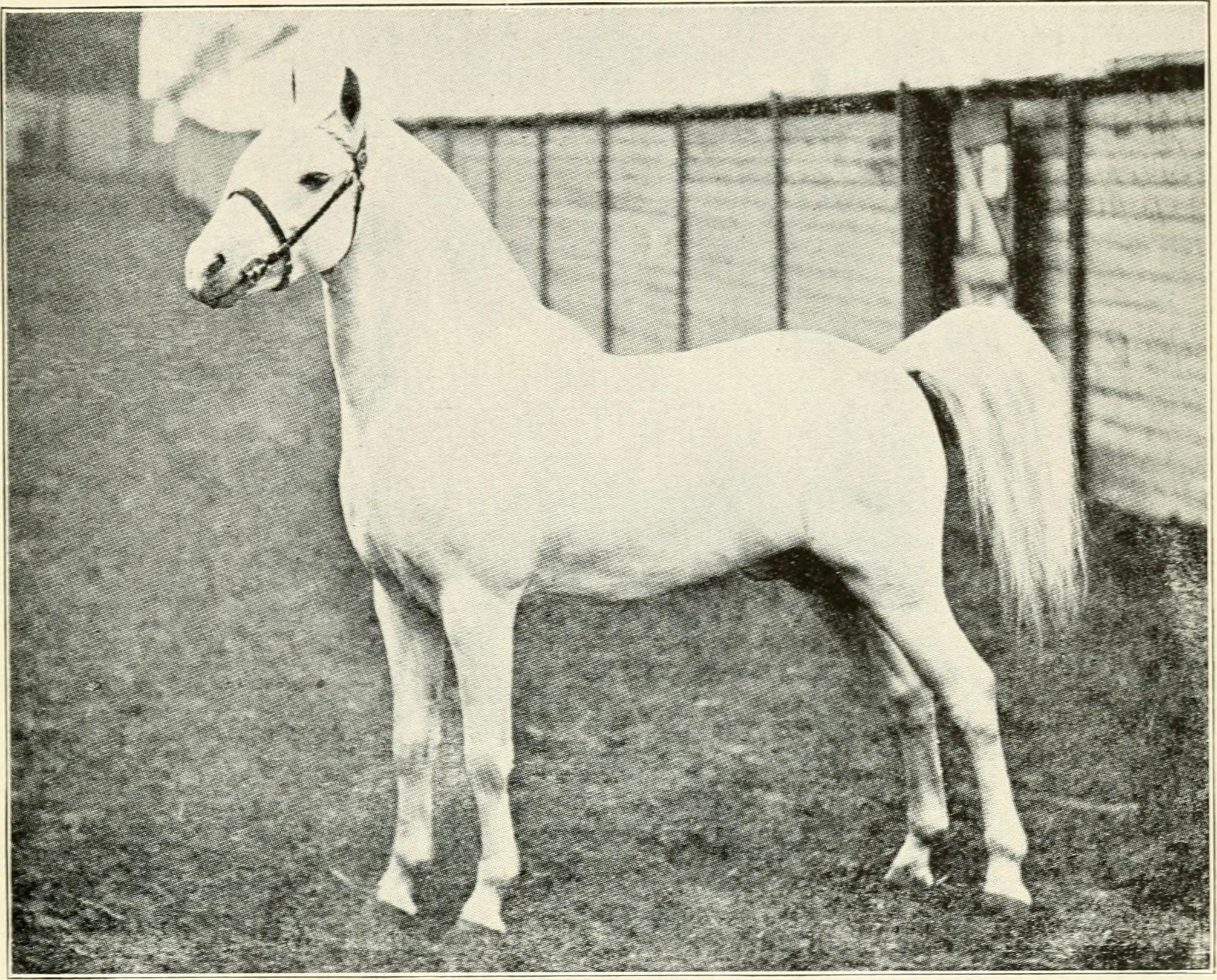
Welsh pony, 1911

In 1901, English and Welsh breeders established a breeders' association, the Welsh Pony and Cob Society, and the first stud book was published in 1902. It was decided that the Welsh Stud Book should be separated into sections divided by type and height. Welsh Ponies were originally only classified as Section A, but in 1931, with the rising demand for riding ponies for children, Section B was added. In the first stud books, the Section B was the Welsh Pony of Cob Type, and the Welsh Cob was Section C and Section D. The upper height limit for Section D Cobs was removed in 1907 and in 1931 Sections C and D were combined as simply Section C. The current standards of Cobs as Sections C and D were finalised in 1949. Until the mid 20th century, the British War Office considered the Welsh Cob so valuable that they paid premiums to the best stallions. After World War II, only three stallions were registered in Section C, but numbers have since recovered.

A small semi-feral population of about 120 animals still roams the Carneddau mountains in Snowdonia, Wales.

Welsh ponies were first exported to the United States in the 1880s, and large numbers were exported between 1884 and 1910. They adapted easily to the terrain and climate variations they encountered in Canada and the United States. An American association, also named the Welsh Pony and Cob Society, formed in 1906, and by 1913 a total of 574 ponies had been registered. During the Great Depression, interest in the breed declined, but made a comeback in the 1950s. The population continued to grow: in 1957, when annual studbooks began to be published, 2,881 ponies had been registered; by 2009, the number was more than 34,000. All Welsh ponies and cobs in the United States descend from ponies registered in the U.K. stud-book.

=== Foundation lines ===
The stallion Dyoll Starlight was credited with being the foundation sire of the modern breed, and was a combination of Welsh and Arab breeding. From his line came an influential stallion of the Section B type: Tan-y-Bwlch Berwyn. This stallion was sired by a Barb and out of a mare from the Dyoll Starlight line. Influential stallions on the Section C and D bloodlines include: Trotting Comet, foaled in 1840 from a long line of trotting horses; True Briton, foaled in 1930, by a trotting sire and out of an Arab mare; Cymro Llwyd, foaled in 1850, by an Arab stallion and out of a trotting mare; and Alonzo the Brave, foaled in 1866, tracing his ancestry through the Hackney breed to the Darley Arabian.

=== Influence ===
The Welsh crosses well with many other breeds, and has influenced the Pony of the Americas and the British Riding Pony. Many are also cross-bred with Thoroughbreds, and other horse breeds. The Welsh Pony has contributed to the founding of several other horse and pony breeds. The Morgan horse is one such breed, being in part descended from Welsh Cobs left far behind by British forces after the end of the American Revolutionary War. They are crossed with Arab horses to produce riding horses, and with Thoroughbreds to produce jumpers, hunters, and eventers. Welsh mares have also been used to breed polo ponies that were agile and nimble. The Welsh Pony was used to create the Welara, a cross-breed of the Welsh and the Arab horse, which has been registered in America as a separate breed ever since 1981.

== Characteristics ==
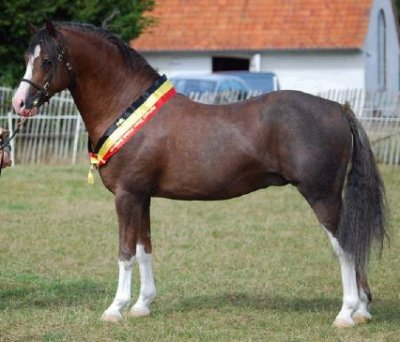
A Welsh pony, showing standard type desired in most sections

All sections of Welsh ponies and Cobs have small heads with large eyes, sloped shoulders, short backs and strong hindquarters. The forelegs are straight and the cannon bone short. The tail is high-set. The breed ranges from 11 hands (44 inches, 112 cm) for the smallest ponies to over 16 hands (64 inches, 163 cm) for the tallest Cobs. They may be any solid colour, but not tobiano or leopard-spotted. Black, grey, chestnut and bay are the most common, but there are also buckskins and palominos. as well as smoky blacks and double creams. However, British equine colour terminology commonly refers to the buckskin colour, which is caused by the same cream dilution gene that produces palomino, as "dun", but the true dun gene is extremely rare in the Welsh breed due to it being bred out of most lines.

Their movement is bold, free and characteristically fast, especially at the trot, with great power coming from the hocks. Their trot has been favourably compared to that of the Standardbred horse. They are reputed to be trustworthy, of a good disposition with even temperaments and friendly characters, but spirited and with great endurance, and are known for their stamina, soundness, and high level of intelligence.

== Sections ==
=== Section A ===
Section A
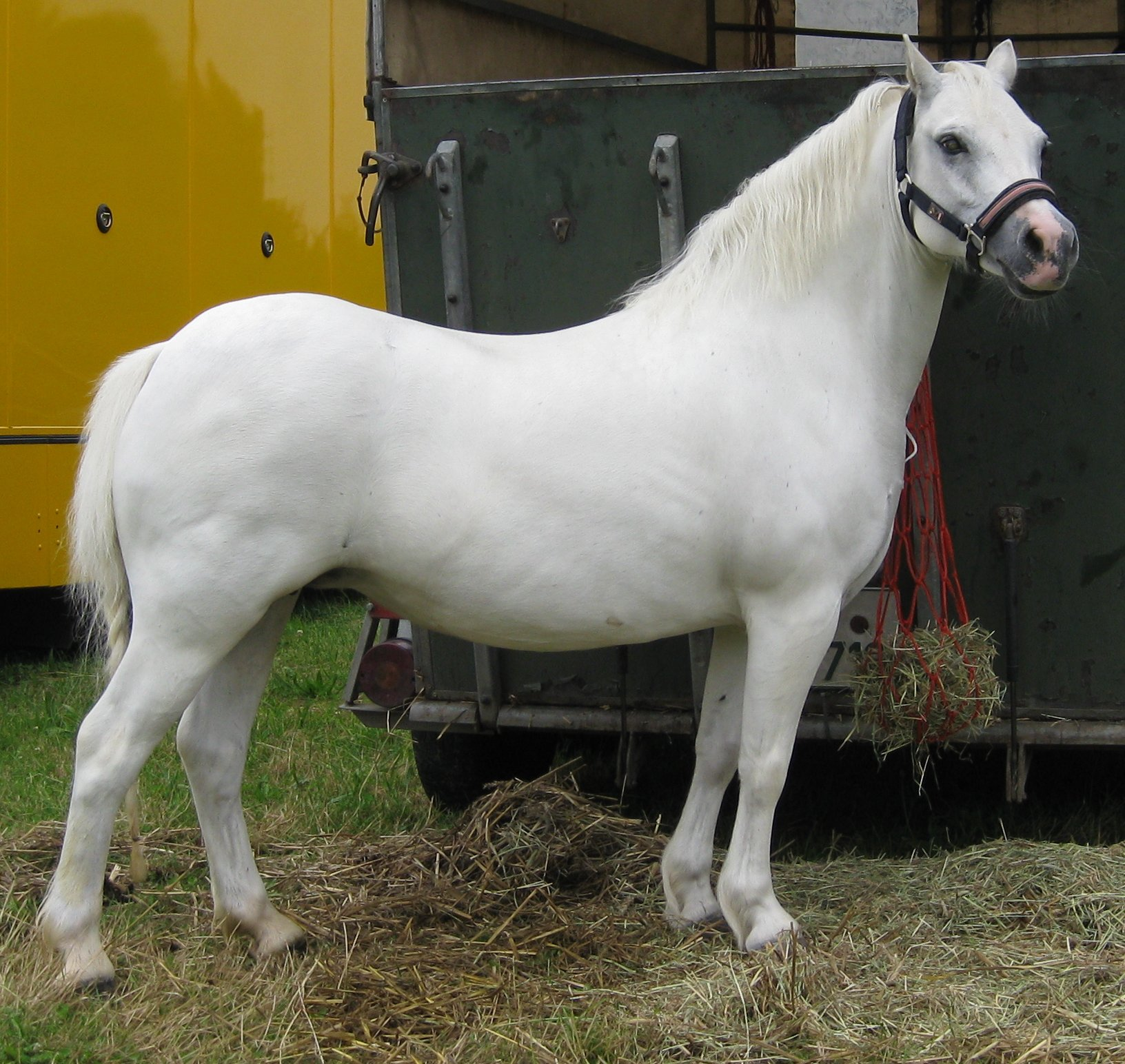
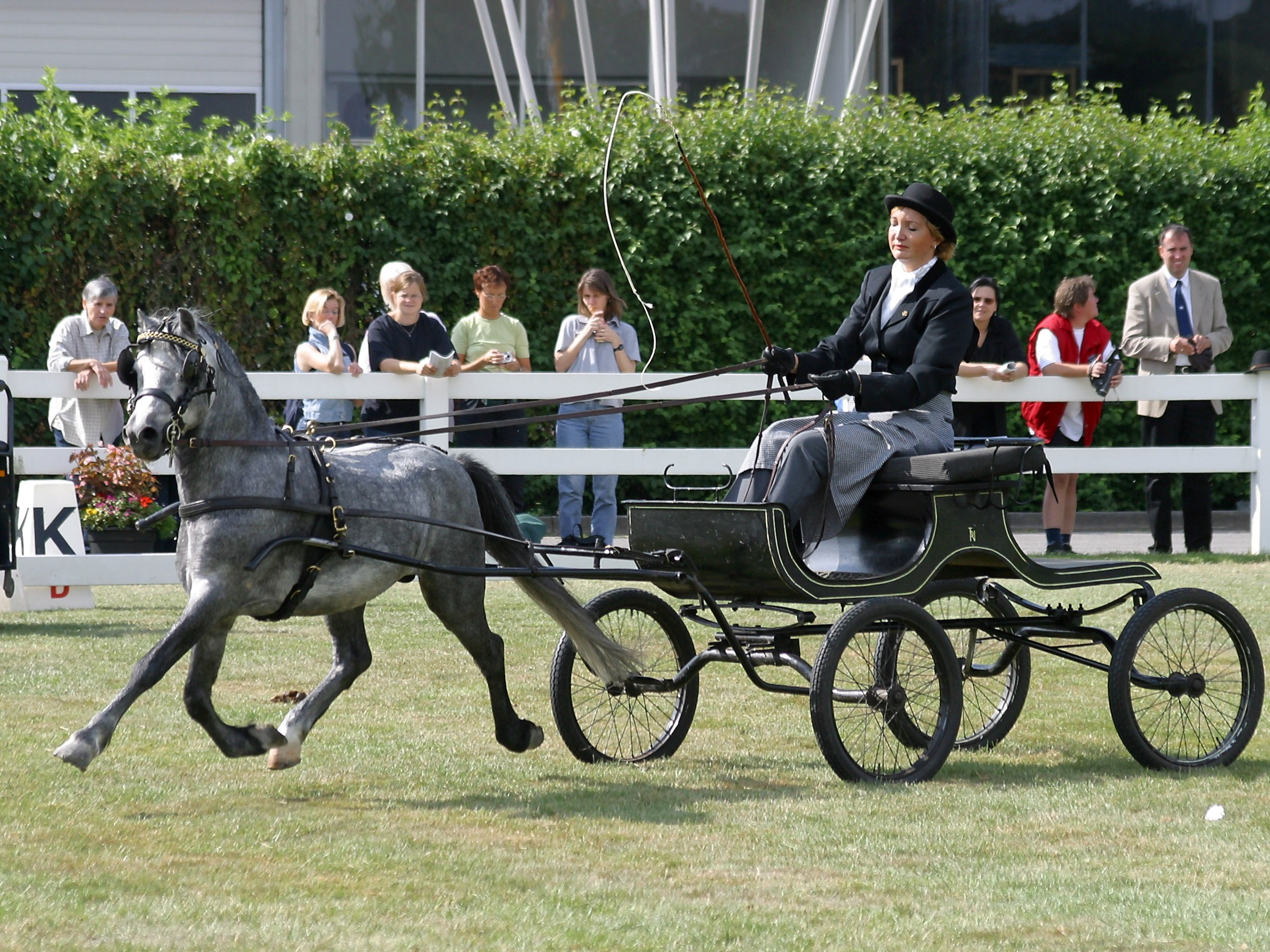

The Welsh Mountain Pony (Section A) is the smallest of the Welsh breeds. Both the Section A and Section B ponies are more refined than those in Section C and D. They are characterised by a large eye, small head (often with a dished face from the Arabian influence), high set on tail, and refined leg conformation, but retaining good bone and correctness.

The Welsh Mountain Pony (Section A) may not exceed 12.2 hands (50 inches, 127 cm) in the USA or 12 hands (48 inches, 122 cm) high in the United Kingdom.

=== Section B ===
Section B
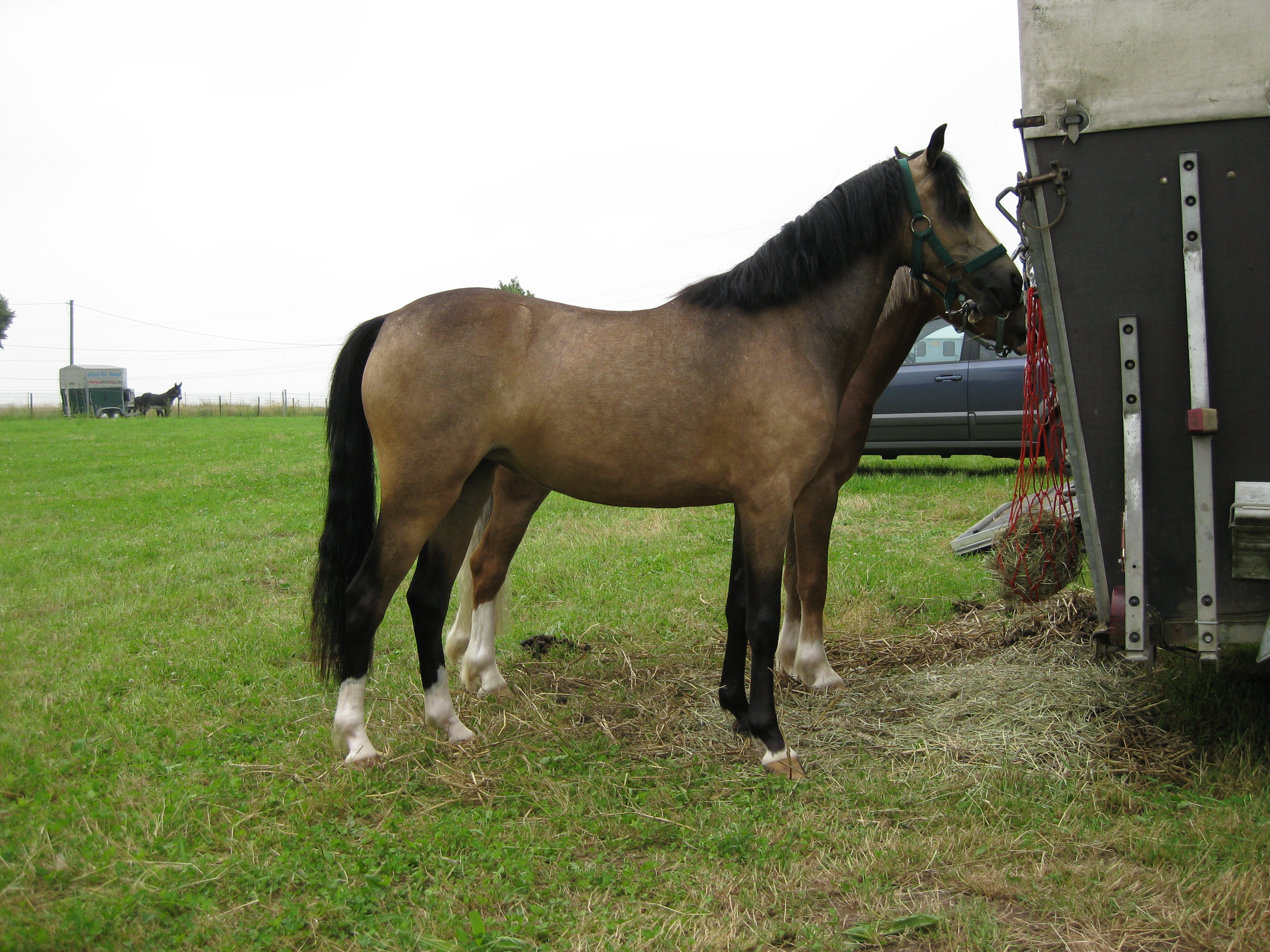
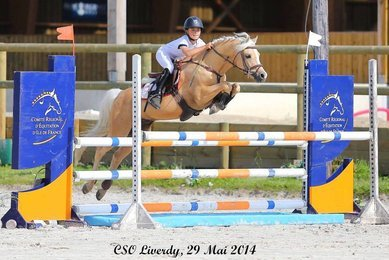

The Welsh Pony of Riding Type (Section B) is the second division within the Welsh pony registry. The Section B Welsh Pony is a larger, riding-type pony, which combines the hardiness and substance of the Section A with elegant movement and athletic ability. Section B ponies are taller than Section A with a maximum height of 13.2 hands (54 inches, 137 cm) in the UK and 14.2 hands (58 inches, 147 cm) in the US. They are known for elegant movement and athletic ability while still retaining the substance and hardiness of the foundation stock, the Section A Welsh Mountain pony. They have no lower height limit.

Section B ponies also generally have a slightly lighter build, as a result of Thoroughbred and Hackney blood. Section B ponies resemble the Section A pony, but are of a more refined "riding type". However, they should not be light of bone; they should resemble their Mountain Pony ancestors for quality of bone. In addition to the desirable characteristics of the Section A pony, Section B ponies have a free-flowing movement. They should have a muscular neck, arching from withers to poll, and have a deep, wide chest. Section B ponies are more commonly used as children's ponies and as pony hunter-jumpers.

=== Section C ===
Section C
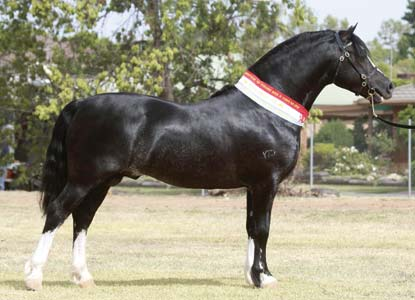
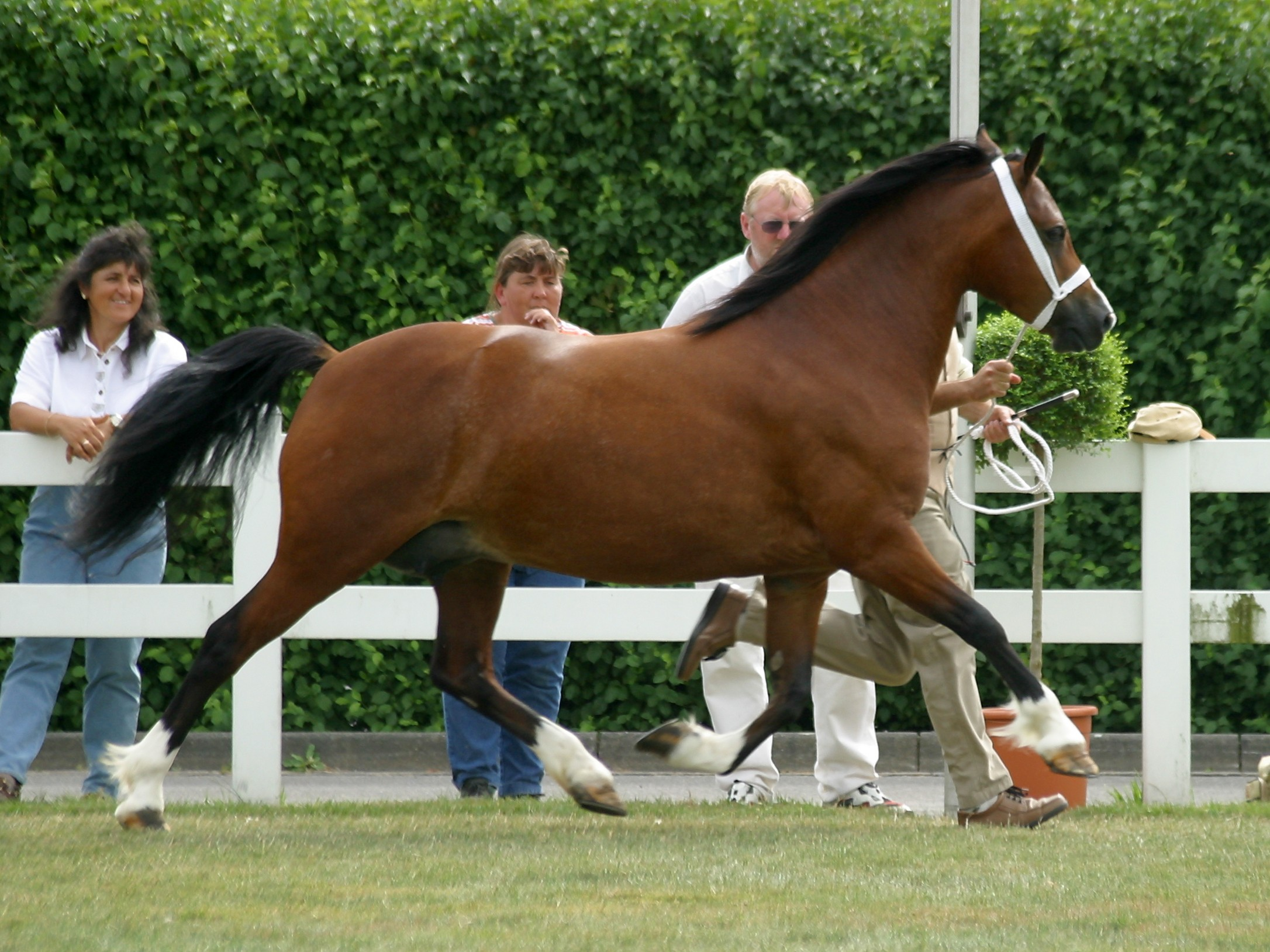

The Welsh Pony of Cob Type (Section C) may not exceed 13.2 hands (54 inches, 137 cm) high. They are known for their strength, hardiness and gentle nature. In contrast to the Welsh pony (Section B), the Pony of Cob Type is heavier, more coblike and compact. They have a moderate amount of feathering on their legs.

The Welsh Pony of Cob Type first resulted from cross-breeding between the Welsh mountain pony (Section A) and the Welsh Cob (Section D). Today, some Section C ponies are still produced from this cross. In the past the WPCS also accepted Section C ponies with Section B blood but that is no longer the case. There were also crosses with Iberian horses, which led to the development of the Powys horse, which was also a foundation for this type. Other breeds also influenced the Section C, including the Norfolk Trotter, the Hackney and Yorkshire Coach Horse.

The Welsh Pony of Cob Type is shown in jumping events and in harness, notably in competitive driving.

=== Section D ===
Section D
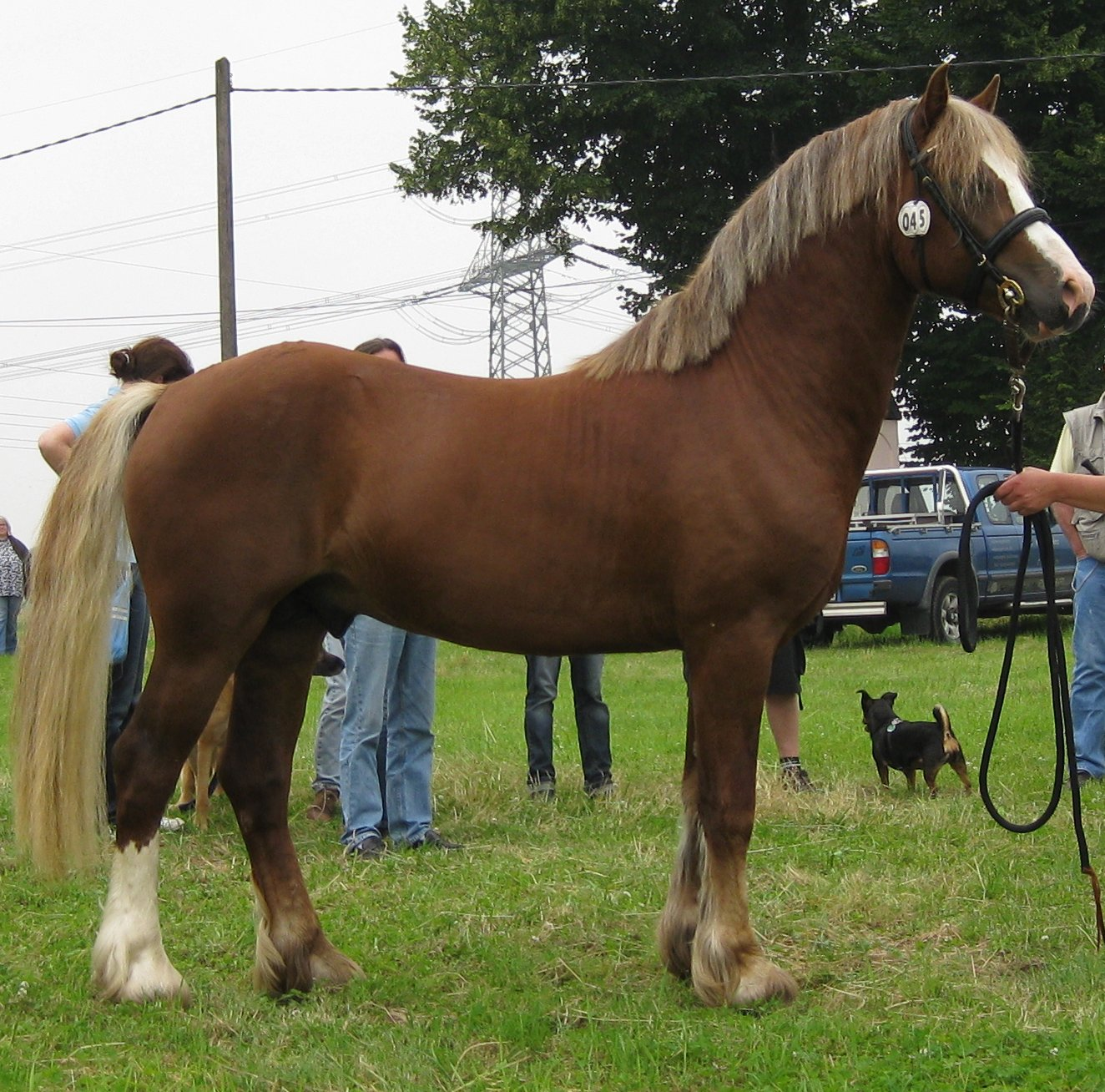
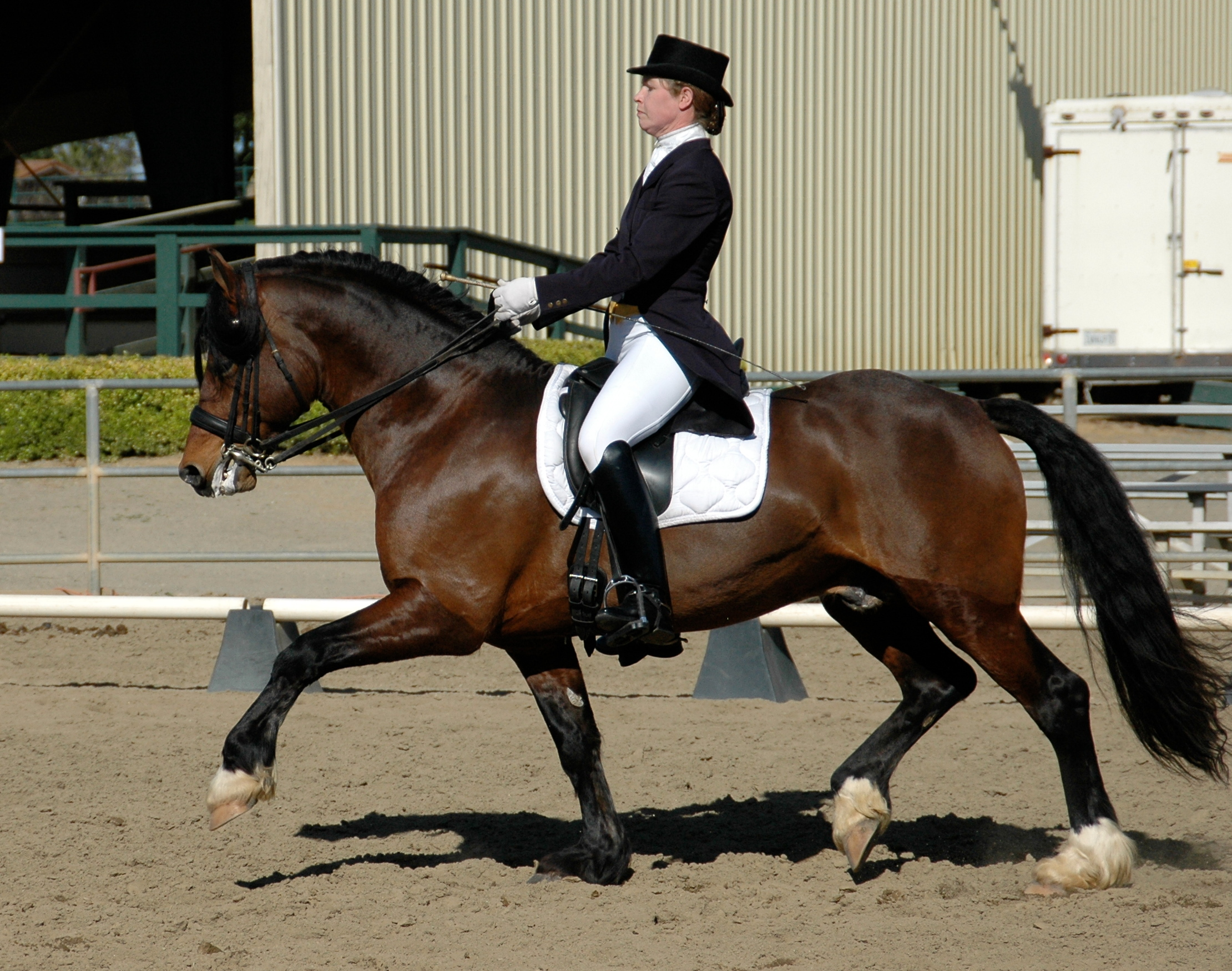

The Welsh Cob (Section D) is the largest size within the Welsh Pony and Cob breed registries. They must be taller than 13.2 hands (54 inches, 137 cm), with no upper height limit. They are used as riding horses for both adults and children, and are also used for driving. They are known for their hardiness and gentle nature.

Though Welsh Cobs are the tallest and stockiest of the Welsh sections, the head remains full of pony character, with large eyes and neat ears. The legs may be relatively short, also akin to pony proportions. Mature stallions have somewhat cresty necks, while those of mares are generally leaner. Like the Section C, they have powerful, extravagant action. Grey colouring is rarer in the Section D Cob than other types of Welsh ponies, but bold white markings are common.

Today, the Section D is best known for use in harness driving, but they are also shown under saddle and in hand. As with the other Welsh breeds, Cobs are also exhibited over fences as hunters and jumpers.

== Uses ==
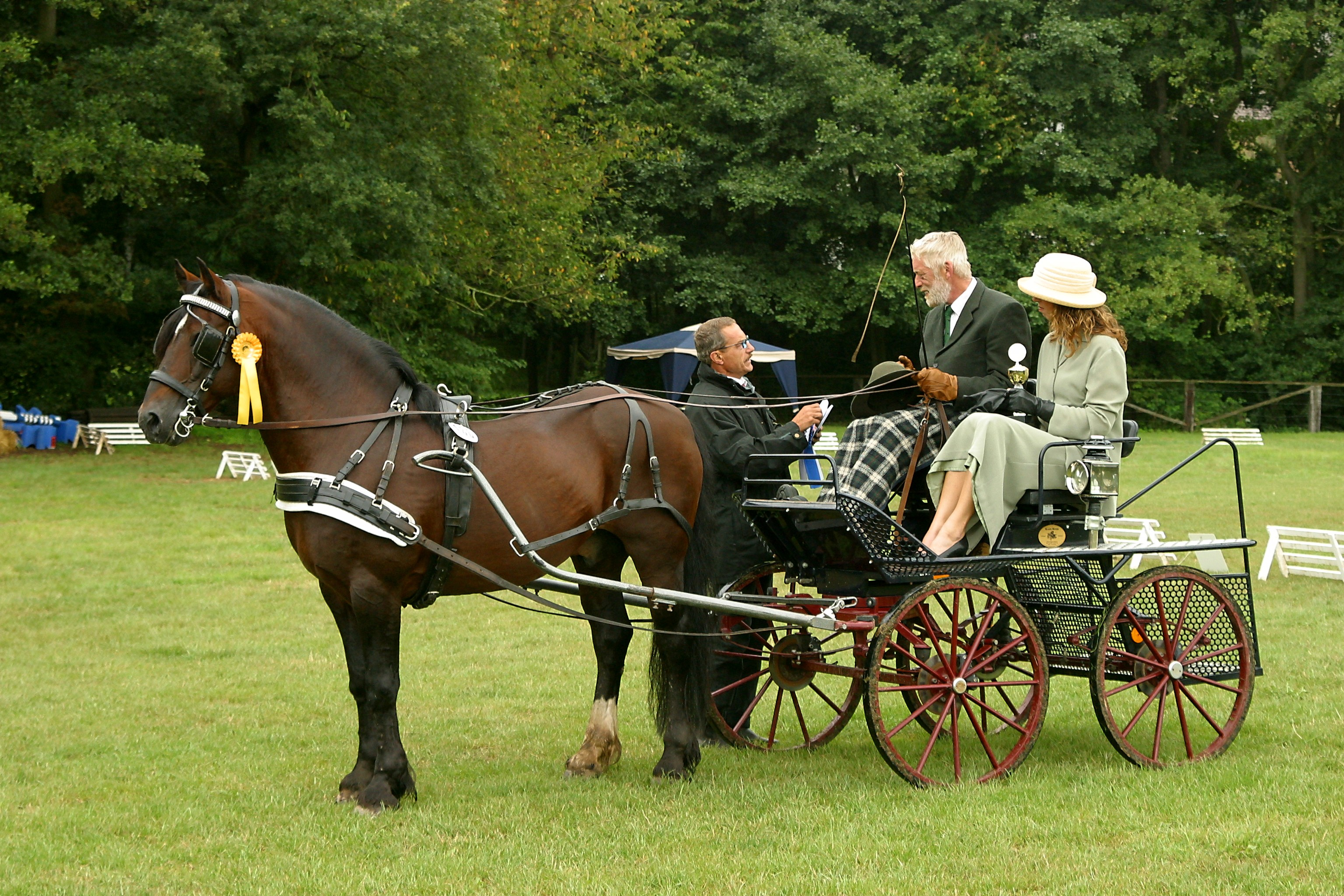
Section D Welsh Cob pulling a carriage

The Welsh Pony has been put to many uses. Historically, they were used for postal routes and in coal mines. The British War Office used the Welsh Cob to pull heavy guns and equipment through terrain where motorised vehicles could not, and also used them for mounted infantry. Today, they are used as riding and driving ponies for both children and adults. Welshes today are also used in dressage, endurance riding, general riding, hunting, jumping, and work activities. They have proven their ability at driving in Fédération Équestre Internationale (FEI) level competition, and have been used for dressage. They also compete against one another in breed show competition as hunters, eventers, and western pleasure horses. The abilities of the Welsh Pony were showcased in 2008 when the first champion Large Pony Hunter to be made into a model Breyer horse was a grey Welsh Pony gelding.
