= Draft horse showing =

Horse show competition

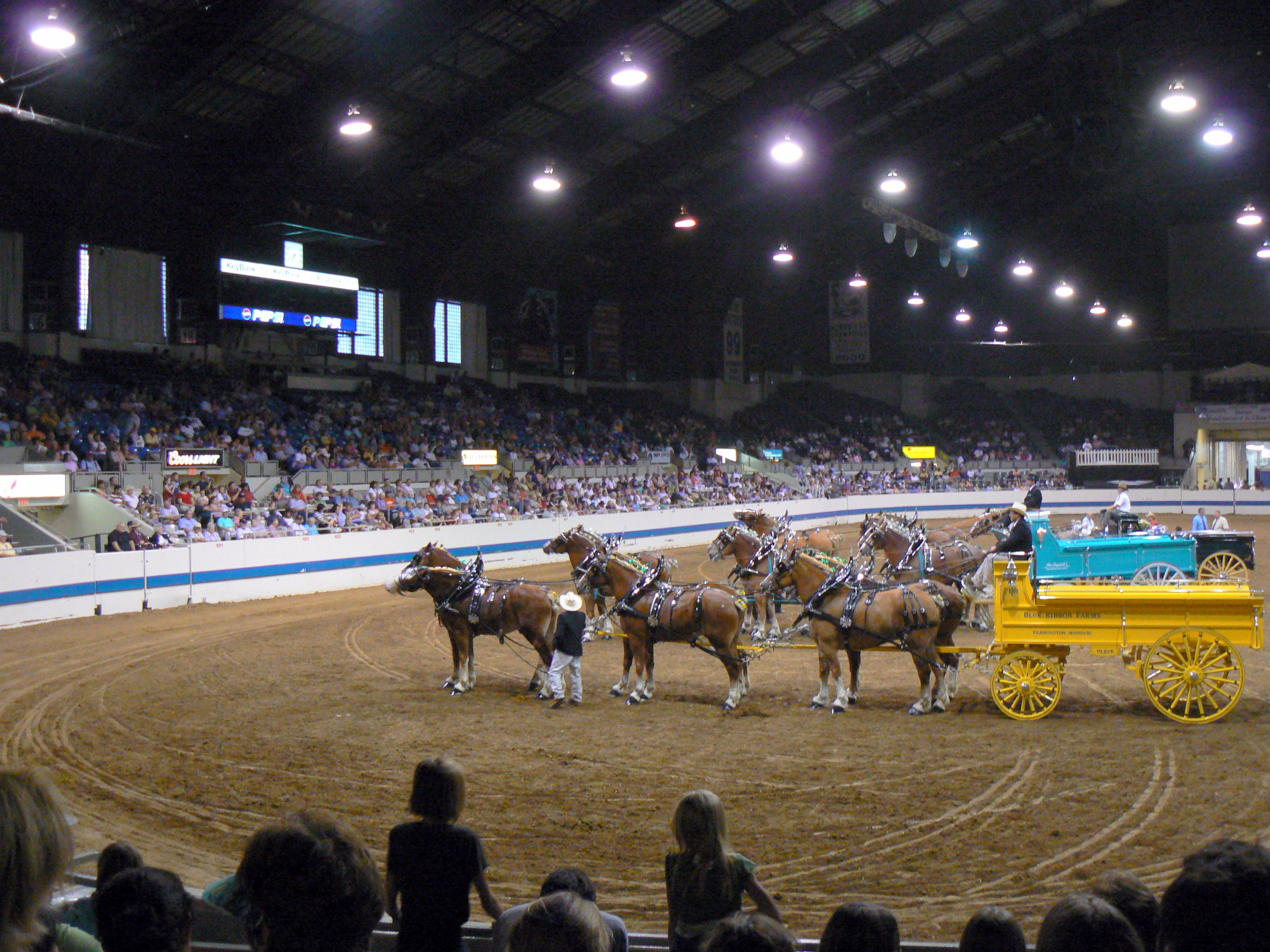
Draft horses lined up in the show arena

Draft horse showing (UK and Commonwealth; draught horse, dray horse or carthorse) refers to horse shows exclusively for horses of the draft horse breeds. In North America the term "Draft horse showing" refers to a specific horse show competition with the competitors driving their horses under harness.

Draft horse shows are different from draft horse pulling competitions, where teams of horses compete to determine who can pull the most weight.

Worldwide, some draft horse shows also feature riding classes, as do a small number of North American shows.

The driving events at these competitions are somewhat akin to fine harness classes at horse shows for light horses, though the four horse and larger hitch classes also resemble some aspects of carriage driving.

== Driving Competitions ==
Clydesdale horses participate in a heavy horse turnout challenge in the UK.

Exhibitors of these classes must follow a pattern for each class in which they participate. The pattern is the same for every class. The hitches enter the arena one at a time, following one another. They travel to the right, along the rail in a counter-clockwise direction. A hitch is a unit consisting of the exhibitor, their horse(s) and vehicle, being a cart or wagon. The judge is observing each hitch from the middle of the ring where they are standing. All of the hitches make a few laps in this counter-clockwise direction and then reverse. A lap is completed when a hitch travels the entire way around the arena next to the rail. When the reverse is made, the hitches diagonally cut the ring in half in order to go the opposite direction. This allows the judge to see the other side of each hitch. A couple more laps are made going in this clockwise direction. While making these laps on the rail, the horses are trotting and usually asked to walk for a few steps only once during the entire class. Next, all of the hitches line up, coming to a complete stop in the middle of the ring, all facing the same direction. The judge then looks at each hitch individually and has them back up. This requires the driver of each hitch to direct their horse(s) to back either the cart or wagon a few feet, stop, and then step forward to the original position. Finally, the judge places all of the hitches in the order of their preference.

== Types of classes ==
=== United States and Canada ===
The main classes in a show exclusively for draft horses are limited to driving competition, and generally include the following:

- Ladies' Cart—One horse driven in a cart by a woman
- Men's Cart—One horse driven in a cart by a man
- Team—Two horses hitched side by side on a show wagon, driven by a man or woman
- Tandem—Two horses hitched with one lead horse directly in front of one wheel horse, driven by a man or woman in a cart. Considered an unsafe hitch by many drivers, since the tendency for the lead horse to turn around and face the wheel horse.
- Unicorn—Three horses hitched as a team with one horse in front of the team, driven by a man or woman
- Four—Four horses hitched as two teams, one pair in front of the other, driven by a man or woman
- Six —Six horses hitched as three teams, one in front of another, driven by a man or woman
- Eight—Eight horses hitched as four teams, one in front of another, driven by a man or woman

"Breeding" or "Halter" classes are also offered at many shows. These classes evaluate the conformation of the animals.

In the United States and Canada, the most common breeds shown are the Belgian and Percheron. Other breeds include the Clydesdale, Shire, Suffolk Punch, and American Cream. The cost of a draft horse depends on the level of competition at which an exhibitor would like to compete. If an exhibitor would like to compete at the highest level, receiving first place honors at the toughest shows, a great horse could cost anywhere from $10,000 to $50,000, with the most expensive horse sold at public auction costing $112,500. A draft horse shown as a hobby and competing only at local or county fairs would start at approximately $1,000.

A harness exhibitor uses appropriate equipment for driving, beginning with a truck and trailer to haul the draft horses to the show. A show harness, a show wagon, and a show cart must be purchased as well. These three items are only used in the arena while a hitch is performing. Another set of work harness and a practice wagon is used at home for training. Along with the costly equipment, decorations that are put up at the draft horse shows and miscellaneous tack items must also be obtained.

A hitch is judged the moment it enters the arena. Usually, there is only one judge for all the hitches in an entire horse show, and it is usually a different judge than the halter classes. The hitches are judged on a variety of aspects including physical conditioning of the horses, conformation, hoof size, cleanliness and quality of turnout, movement of the horses, quality of action, manners and how well the horses work together as a team and as a hitch as a whole. The presentation and soundness of the wagon is also evaluated, as well as the drivers ability to drive the hitch.

There is no standard or uniform set of rules. All judges have their own opinion on what they like, putting more emphasis on certain aspects than others do. This is what makes draft horse showing so unique; the outcome of a show can never be predicted.

== Australia ==
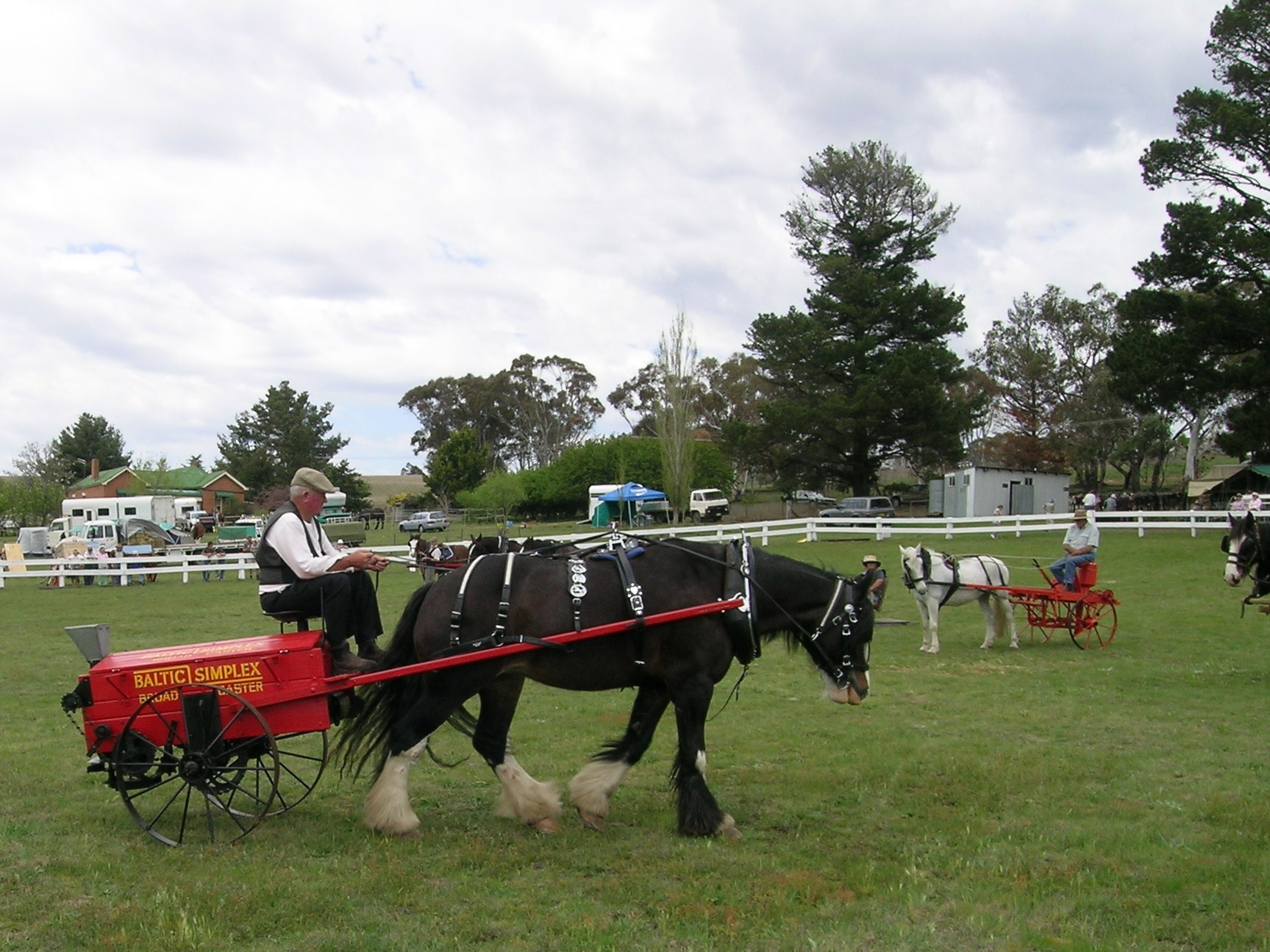
Horse drawn fertilizer spreader in an agricultural implements class at Woolbrook, New South Wales

The major agricultural shows in Australia hold led (conformation), trade and turnout classes for draft horses. At field days draft horses are also shown in long reining, ridden, log snigging, ploughing, pulling, novelty events, agricultural and other implements events, too.

The draft breeds exhibited in Australia include the Australian Draught Horse, Belgian, Clydesdale, Percheron, Shire and the Suffolk Punch.

== Preparation for a show ==
Before leaving the farm all equipment is checked for problems, cleaned thoroughly, and packed into the truck–trailer used for travel. Most hitches use a semi trailer to transport their horses and all their equipments from show to show. Generally, the maximum number of horses that can be trailered in this manner is nine. Most exhibitors arrive the day before showing begins so that they may set up their stalls, including stall decorations that display the farm name and colors, and prepare for the hectic show schedule.

Most exhibitors bathe their horses before departing from their home farms so that their stock arrive at the show looking well groomed. Other trainers and farms are evaluating their competition as soon as they arrive, so this is as much for show as is practical. Depending on the show's facilities, the draft horses tend to be hosed down upon arrival, or bathed completely to remove any dirt from their coats, though each farm has their own way of doing things. Clydesdales require extra attention after the bathing process, due to their leg feathers, which are coated in sawdust to help keep dirt out of the wet hair.

The morning of the show horses are completely groomed, sometimes using a vacuum to remove any dust that has settled into the horses' coats since their bath. Next, most breeds have their hooves painted black, usually with hoof black or a glossy black spray paint. Exceptions to this are the Clydesdale and Shire breeds which commonly have white hooves, linked to the white leg markings preferable for their breed. For these breeds, it is necessary to powder their white feathers with baby powder, or a similar substance, once again depending on preference.

While the hooves are drying, the mane is rolled and tails are braided up in a specific way. At this point, the horses are harnessed and then sprayed with fly spray to prevent movement in the show ring. Harnesses are wiped down again to remove any dust that has settled on them and the horses are hitched to the cart or wagon that will be used during the next class.

== See also ==
- Horse show
