= Old English Black =

Breed of horse

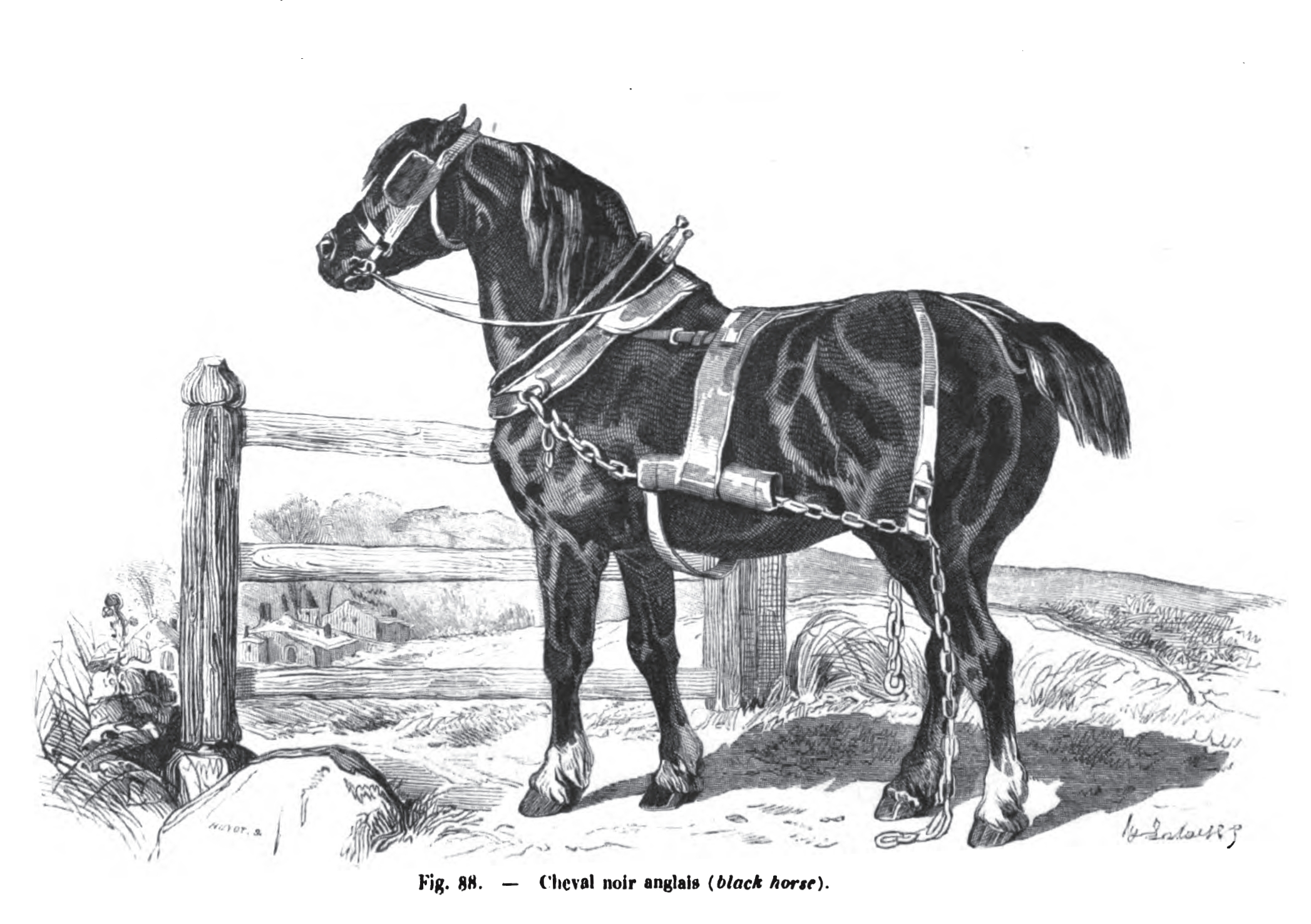
Old English Black

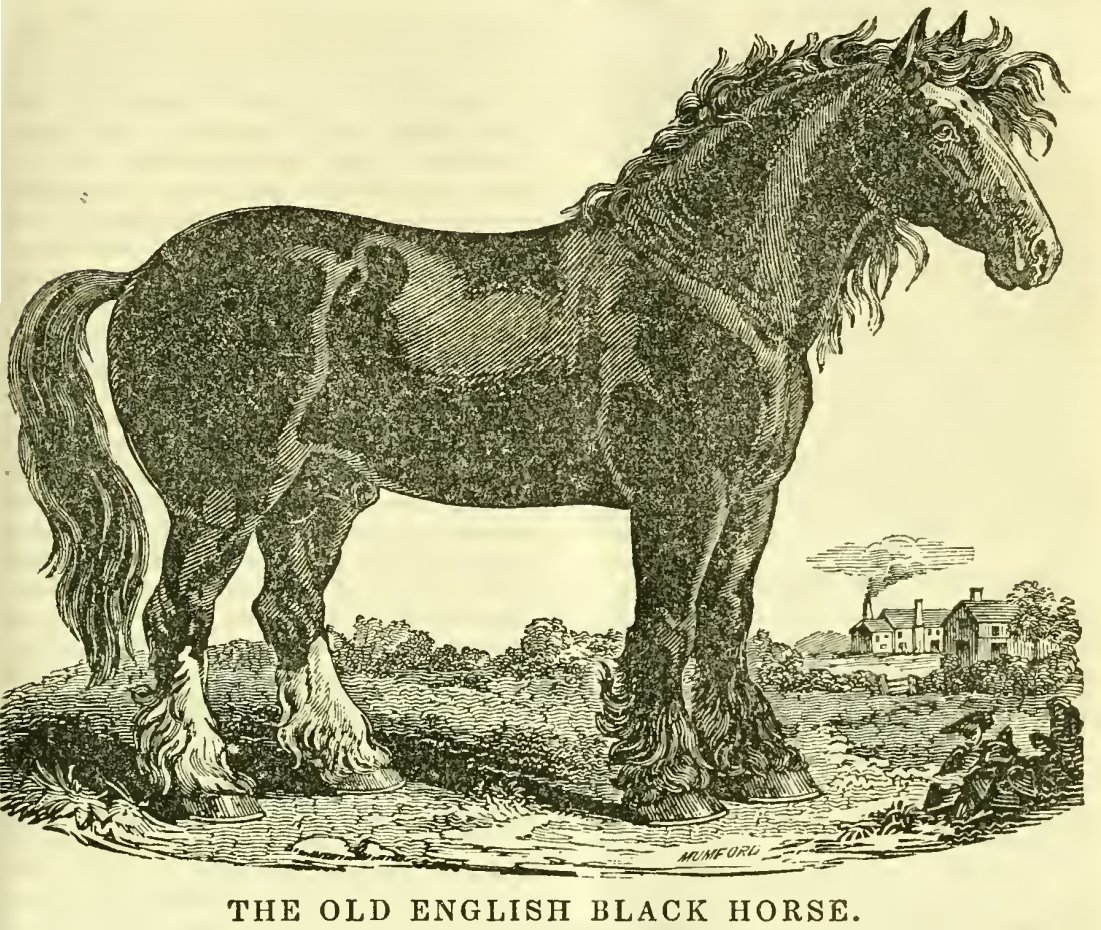
Engraving of the breed type

The Old English Black (also known as Lincolnshire Black) is an extinct horse breed.

During the time of the Norman Conquest in 1066, the Normans may have carried some of the Great Horses from Europe across the English Channel and bred them with native Horses. Eventually, a distinct type evolved that was known as the Old English Black Horse.

Despite the name, the breed had not been a colour breed. For a long period of time, bays and browns were more commonplace than blacks. There were also roans, greys, and chestnuts among them. The colour markings were not unlike those of Clydesdale horses, with the desired pattern being four white stocking and a well-defined bald face.

Large Dutch horses (possibly of Brabant and Friesian descent) were imported by William III when he discovered that the cart horses of his era were not strong enough for the task of draining the Lincolnshire Fens. These horses became known as the Lincolnshire Blacks.

Eventually, the Old English Black Horse became extinct as a distinct breed and its bloodlines merged into other breeds. According to Hall and Clutton-Brock, Robert Bakewell developed the Old English Black Horse into the Black Horse of Leicestershire, a forerunner of the Shire Horse of the Midlands. The Old English Black Horse heavily influenced the bloodlines of the Clydesdale and Shire, and these breeds today have many features inherited from their ancestors.
