= Australian Draught =

Australian breed of draught horse

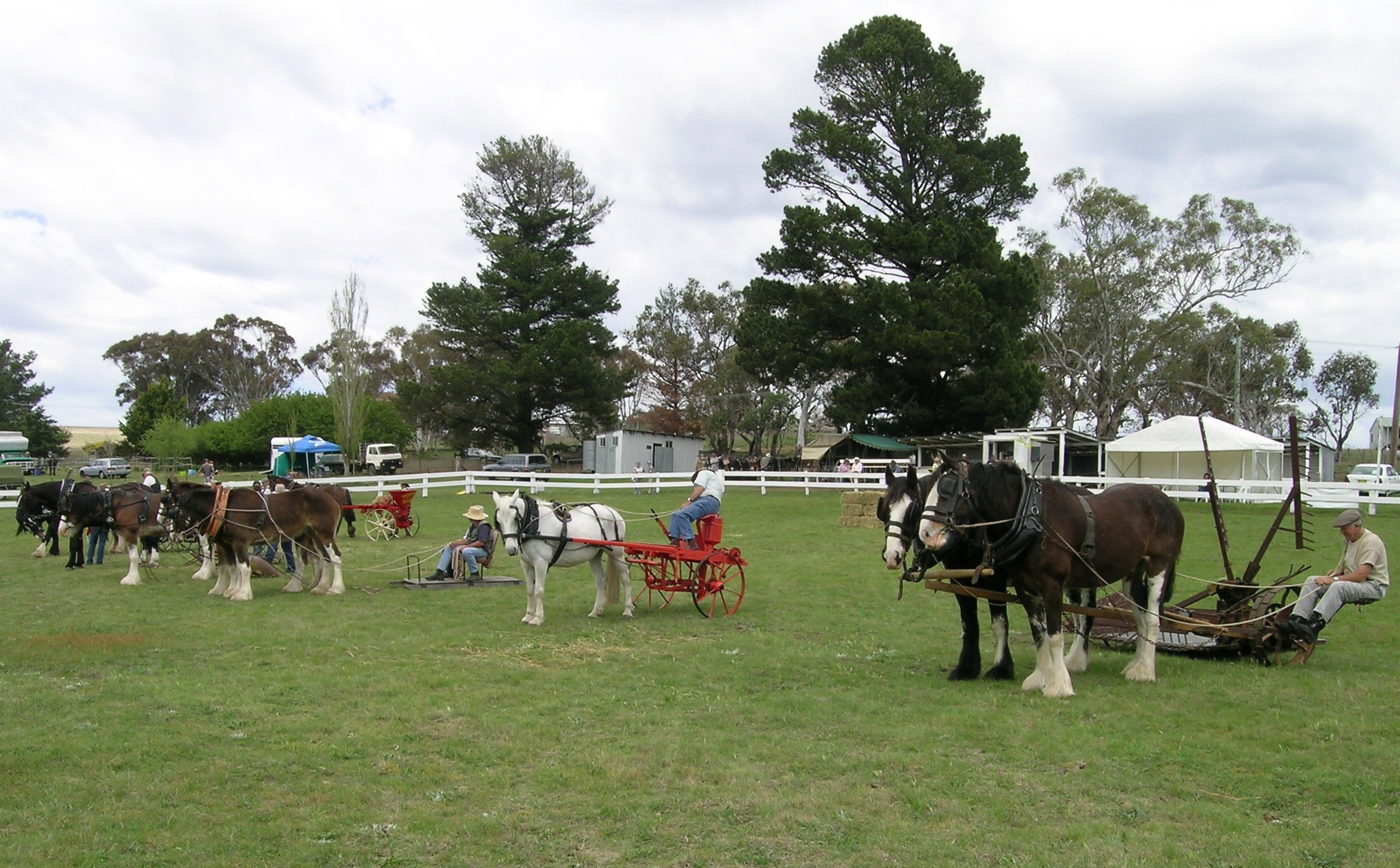
- Australian Draught competition, Woolbrook, NSW
- Country of origin: Australia

The Australian Draught is a hardy Australian breed of draught horse, noted for its strength and a good temperament.

== Characteristics ==
The Australian Draught was developed over the years as a result of the crossbreeding of the four recognized pure draught horse breeds which were in Australia since the colonial days. These breeds are the Clydesdale, Percheron, Shire, Suffolk Punch, (plus the later imported Belgians) and occasionally some light horse bloodlines, as seen in the part draughts.

The characteristics of these breeds can be found in the Australian Draught, which has produced many colours and types within the breed. All solid colours are accepted, excessive white is not favoured on the face or body, white below the knee is acceptable.

== History ==
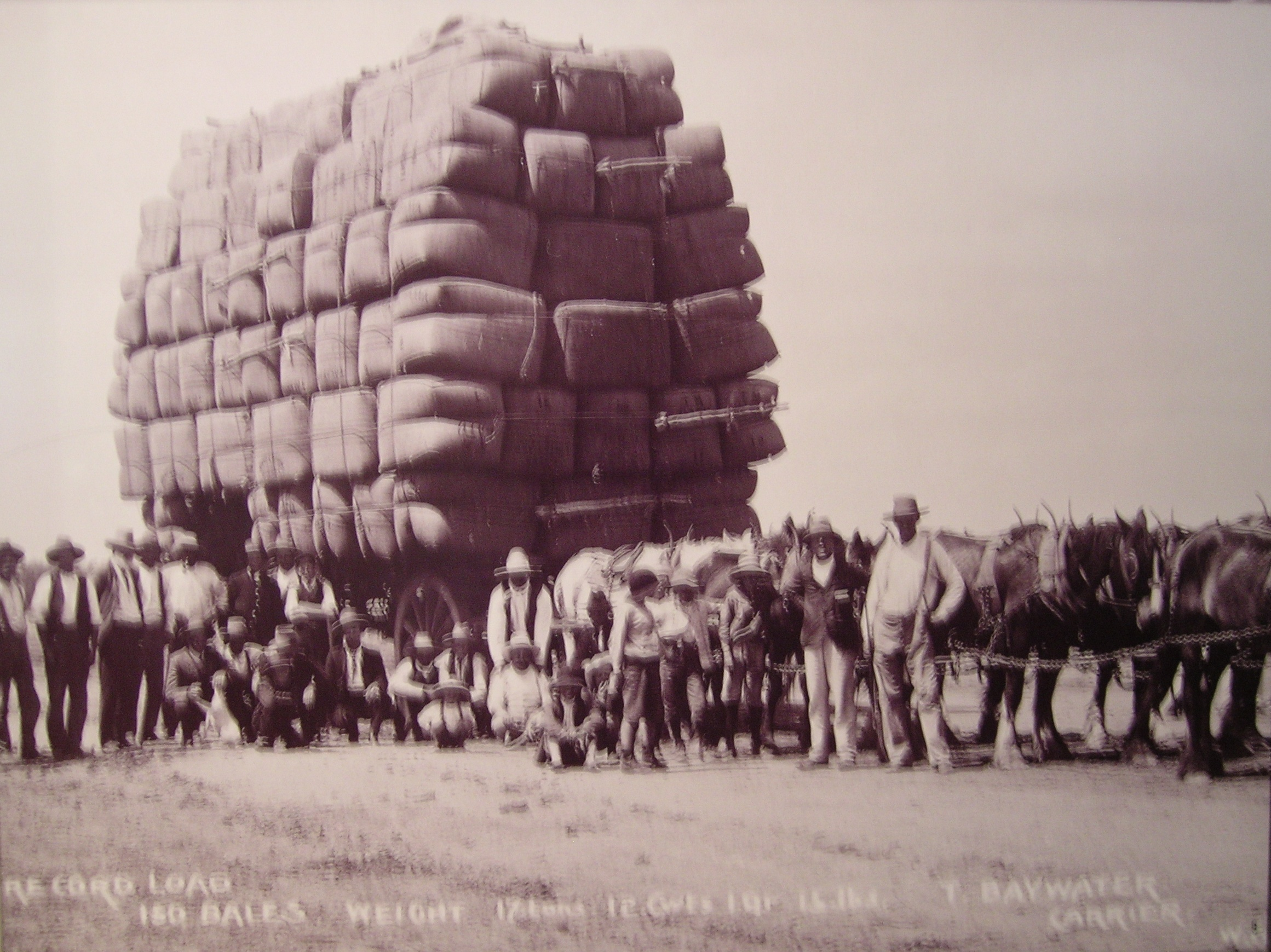
A team of Australian draught horses with a record load of 150 bales of wool

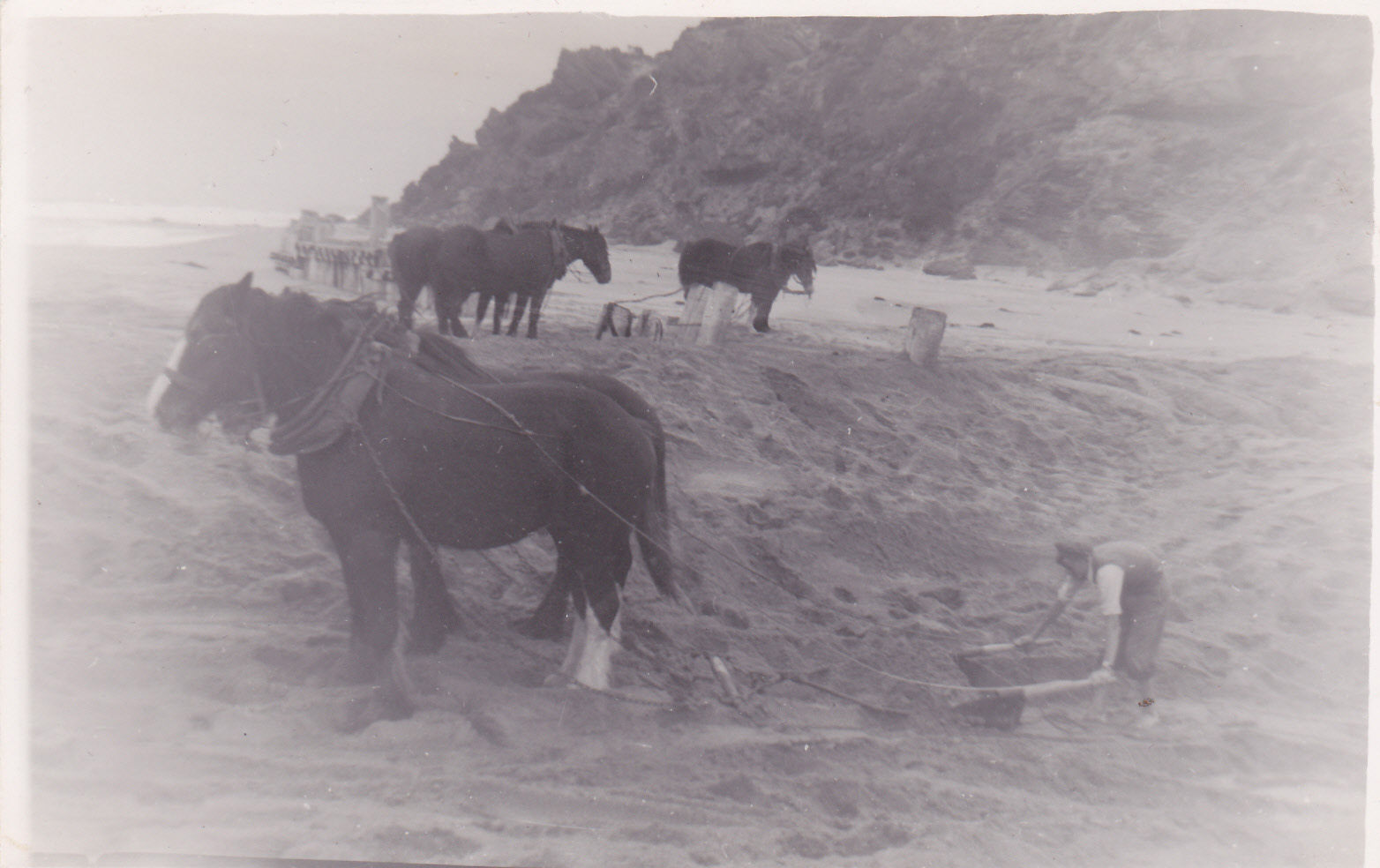
Draught horses used in 1948 to clear Aire River, Victoria mouth to prevent salt water damage inland

The roots of the Australian Draught Horse date back to the circa 1854 importation of stallions and mares of various English and Flemish cart breeds to Australia. Van Diemen's Land (now Tasmania) was at the forefront of breeding cart and farm horses with the part played by the Van Diemen's Land Company. This company also imported Shire horses, which were later imported to Western Australia and South Australia in the late 1830s.

Bullocks did most of the heavy draught work until the 1850s. The development of the agricultural industry after the gold rushes required a ready supply of draught horses to provide faster load movements. Scottish settlers did much to promote the use of the Clydesdale horses owing to their familiarity with them.

Weinholt Brothers formed a notable draught horse stud at Maryvale, Queensland, in 1885. Most states preferred Shire horses, but in Victoria, the Clydesdale was more popular. Suffolk Punch horses were favoured in northern NSW and on the black-soil country.

The Clydesdale Stud Book was established in Australia in 1915, prior to which breeding was somewhat haphazard. After 1918, tractors were rapidly replacing draught horses until the 1930s depression, when renewed interest in them was kindled. By 1950, tractors had virtually replaced the draught horse on rural properties in Australia.

The Australian Draught Horse Stud Book Society was established around 1979 to promote these horses and breeding programs. Today, the Australian Draught used in led, novelty, ridden, and draught competitions and is still valued as a working horse on small farms throughout Australia.

== See also ==
- Draft horse showing
