= Gypsy horse =

Breed of horse from British Isles

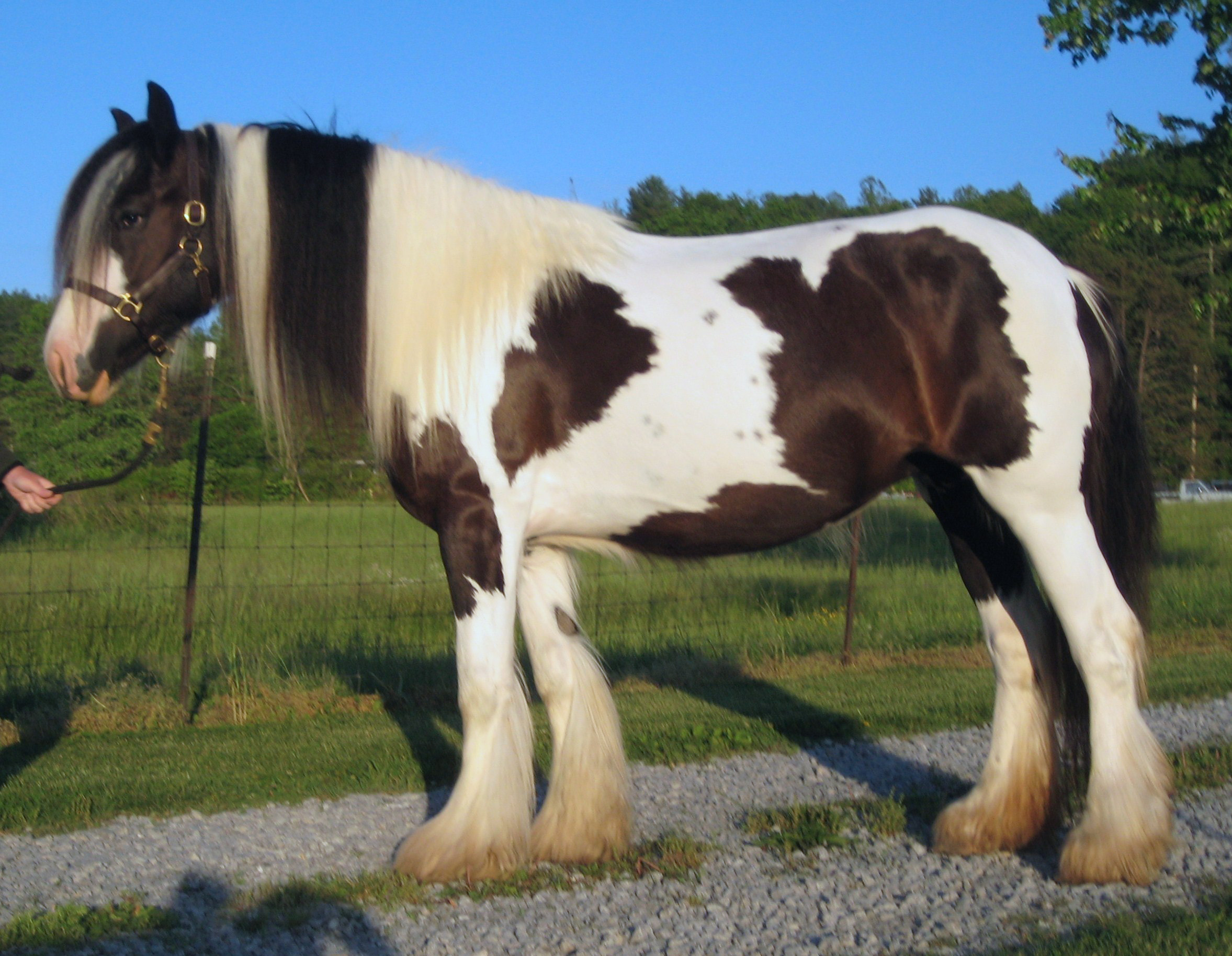

- Other names: Gypsy Horse; Gypsy Vanner; Irish Cob; Tinker Horse; Traditional Gypsy Cob (UK); Gypsy (USA); Tinker (Europe)
- Country of origin: Ireland, United Kingdom

Traits
- Distinguishing features: Cob conformation, often piebald or skewbald, feathered heels

Breed standards
- Gypsy Vanner Horse Society (USA); Gypsy Horse Registry of America (USA); Gypsy Horse Association (USA); Australasian Gypsy Horse Society; New Zealand Gypsy Cob Association

The Gypsy Cob, also known as the Traditional Gypsy Cob, Irish Cob, Romani Cob, Gypsy Horse, or Gypsy Vanner, is a breed of domestic horse from the British Isles. It is a small, solidly-built horse of cob conformation and is usually piebald. It is associated with Irish Travellers and English Romanichal Travellers. There was no stud-book or breed registry for these horses until 1996, but as breeders developed standards and recorded pedigrees, there are now organizations that register qualifying horses. (Note: This includes the Traditional Gypsy Cob Association and breed organisations in Ireland, the Netherlands, Germany, Denmark Sweden Czech Republic, New Zealand, three in the USA – , the Gypsy Horse Association, the Gypsy Horse Registry of America (formerly called the Gypsy Cob Society of America), and the Gypsy Vanner Horse Society – and one in Australia, the Australasian Gypsy Horse Society.)

From about 1850, travelling people in the British Isles began to use this horse to pull their caravans called vardos. The color and look of the breed were refined in the years after the Second World War. Horses of this type were first exported to the United States in 1996.

== Characteristics ==
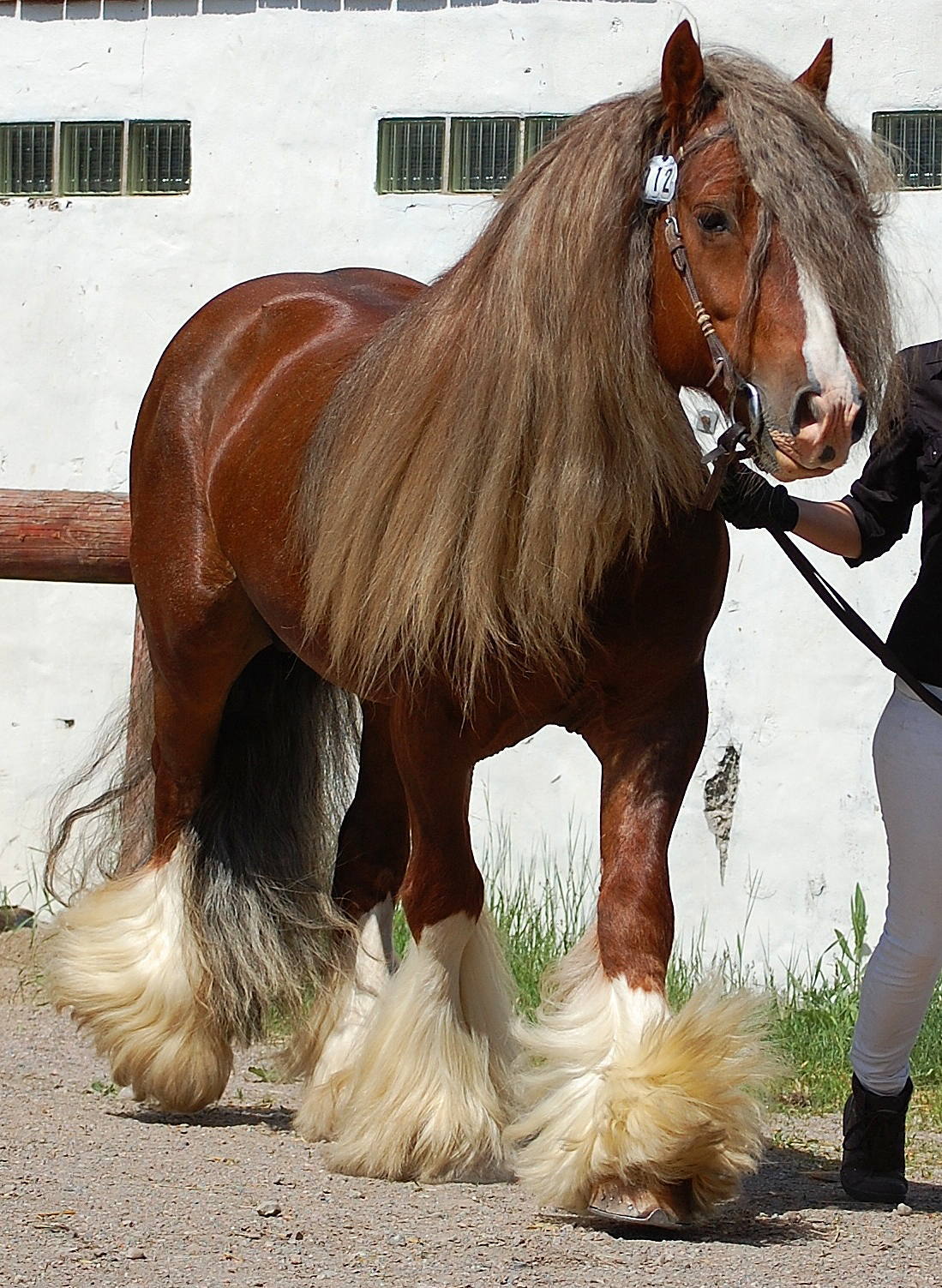
A solid-coloured Gypsy horse

The Gypsy horse is usually, but not always, piebald. It may also be skewbald or any solid colour; a solid-coloured horse with white splashing on the underbelly is called "blagdon" or "splashed". There is no coat colour requirement in the breed standard of the Irish Cob Society, Gypsy Cob Register, Gypsy Vanner Horse Society, Gypsy Horse Registry of America, or Australasian Gypsy Horse Society. Since the horse originates in the British Isles, British colour names may be used in registration in the United States.

There are many breed societies for the Gypsy horse, with variations in their respective breed standards. The range of desired heights is generally from 13 to 16 hands (52 to 64 inches, 132 to 163 cm) in the United States and Australasia, but in Ireland and continental Europe, the desired height limit goes up to 16.2 hands (66 inches, 168 cm) for some types and they permit both lighter-boned as well as larger horses than typically desired by the American organisations. (Note: The Gypsy Vanner Horse Society prefers height between 13.2 and 15.2 hands (54 and 62 inches, 137 and 157 cm), and will not register horses outside the range 13 to 16 hands (52 to 64 inches, 132 to 163 cm). The Australasian Gypsy Horse Society between 13 and 15.1 hands (52 and 61 inches, 132 and 155 cm). The Gypsy Horse Association prefer animals 13 to 15.2 hands (52 to 62 inches, 132 to 157 cm).) Some stud-books have different categories: The Gypsy Horse Registry of America has two height classifications: Section A for purebred horses under 14.2 hands (58 inches, 147 cm) and Section B for purebred horses 14.2 hands (58 inches, 147 cm) and over. Its Section C is for Gypsy Crossbred horses. The Netherlands stud-book for Gypsy horses, the Nederlands Stamboek voor Tinkers, identified there as the "Tinker horse," classifies horses into three groups: "cob," "vanner," and "grai," based on height in metres and degree of refinement. The cob type is approximately 14.3 to 15.1 hands (59 to 61 inches, 150 to 155 cm), and the vanner 15.1 to 16.2 hands (61 to 66 inches, 155 to 168 cm). The more refined "grai" may be of any size but is typically within the 14.3- to 16.2-hand range.

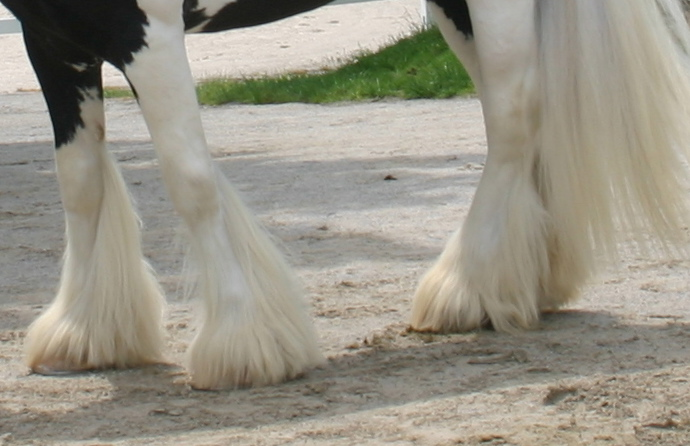
Feather on the lower legs

Feathering, long hair on the legs, is considered a "characteristic and decorative feature of the Irish Cob", but is not a requirement for registration.

A Gypsy Horse's facial profile should be straight, neither overly dished nor roman nosed. A "sweet" head, more refined than that of most draught horses, is desired. The GHA's breed standard states that the head may be "sweet", "a small, tidy pony type head", meaning without coarseness and in proportion with the body, but the AGHS calls unequivocally for a sweet head, "more refined than a Shire might have ... with broad forehead, generous jaw, square muzzle, and even bite". According to GVHS, the "forehead must be flat and broad ... with [t]he frontal facial bone ... flat to slightly convex".

The neck is strong, muscular, and of medium length "with a throat latch slightly deeper than lighter breeds". The chest should be broad, deep, and well muscled. Withers are "well rounded, not high and fine, i.e., hardly noticeable". Most standards call for a "well-sloped" shoulder. But the GVHS's standard is more precise, specifying a shoulder angle ranging from 45 degrees to 60 degrees. The back is to be short coupled with well sprung ribs and a deep heart girth. The length of line of the belly should be twice that of the topline of the back and the horse should not appear "wasp waisted". The Dutch breed standard for vanner and cob types requires a strong, well-muscled build with abundant feathering, similar to that of other associations. The "grai" is classified as a lighter and more refined riding type.

Strong hindquarters define the breed as a small draught horse, "designed for strength and power, but with class, presence and style." They are sometimes described as having an "apple butt" as the croup is well rounded and "very generous, smooth and broad". Poorly-muscled hindquarters or a too-sloping rump are unacceptable. The line measuring the length of the hip should also be horizontal; if the tailhead falls below the horizontal line intersecting the point of the hip, the horse's "hip/croup will be approaching too steep an angle for the Gypsy Vanner".

Bone in the legs should be heavy, clean, and flat. GVHS's standard calls for a length of forearm to cannon ratio of 55% to 45%. The front legs should be clean and flat in joints as well as bone; front pasterns should slope at the same angle as the shoulder and should not be short. A line drawn from the point of the buttock should touch the back of the hock, run "parallel" to the cannon bone, and touch the ground directly behind "the center of the heel". Pastern and hoof angles of the hindlegs are more vertical than the forelegs, usually over 50 degrees. Hooves have strong walls and a well shaped frog, round and with wide heels.

The hind legs of the Gypsy Horse should display proper angulation for a pulling horse, although not to the degree found in larger feathered draught breeds such as the modern Shire and Clydesdale. Unlike the equine conformational flaw of cow-hockedness, where only the lower leg is turned outward, a Gypsy Horse's entire hind leg is set so as to angle outward. As a result, when the hind legs of a horse set up squarely are viewed from the rear, their cannon bones appear parallel.

The Gypsy horse has distinct gaits. According to GHA's standard, "The stride should be correct, supple, and powerful. Showing good impulsion from behind, demonstrating powerful drive. Flowing, effortless in appearance". The horse's movement should be "natural, not artificial ... Some have higher knee action than others, it's[sic] way of going can vary from short and economical to longer, reaching strides." GHRA's standard requires "[a] steady forward walk with impulsion. Ground covering trot with a slight flick of feather at the point of extension."

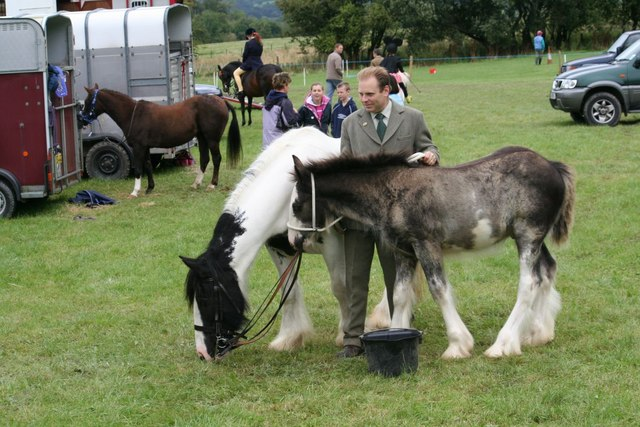
Mare and foal near Builth Wells, Powys, Wales

The Gypsy horse generally is a "strong, kind, (very) intelligent partner that works willingly and harmoniously with its handler. They are also described as mannerly and manageable, eager to please, confident, courageous, alert, and loyal with a genuine sociable outlook. The Gypsy Horse is renowned for its gentle, tractable nature and sensible disposition."

The Gypsy Horse is prone to diseases common to feathered draught horses. The most serious of these is chronic progressive lymphedema. This condition may have a genetic component, as is a similar condition in humans. However, studies to date have not identified a causative gene. Of less concern is pastern dermatitis ("greasy heels"). The moist environment under the feathering is an ideal environment for the combination of fungus and mites which are believed to cause it.

== History ==
Historic image of a traveller family, vardo, and horse

Caravans at Appleby Horse Fair

The Gypsy Horse was bred by the Romanichal Travellers of Great Britain to pull the vardoes in which they lived and travelled. Romanichal Travellers had arrived in the British Isles by 1500 AD, but they did not begin to live in vardoes until the middle of the 1800s. Prior to that, they travelled in tilted carts or afoot and slept either under or in these carts or in small tents. The peak usage of the horse-drawn Gypsy caravan occurred in the latter part of the 19th century and the first two decades of the 20th. The advent of the gasoline powered engine and the loss of horses to World War I worked together to bring the horse-drawn era to a close.

Some aspects of training, management, and characteristics of a horse used to pull a vardo are unique. For example, the horse is trained not to stop until it reaches the top of a hill; otherwise it may not be able to get started again. Training begins at a very early age with the young horse tied "with a short rope from the head to the trace-ring on the collar of the shaft-horse", and led along on the off side. An old hat is sometimes placed on a fearful horse's head so as to keep him from seeing back over the top of his blinkers at the wagon looming at his back. A horse used to pull a vardo which was a permanent home was usually in very good condition due to a combination of exercise, grazing a variety of greens in the hedgerows, and good quality care; the horse was considered part of the family. Since the family's children lived in close proximity to the horse, one having "an unreliable temper could not be tolerated".

The Gypsy Horse was also used to pull the "tradesman's cart . . . used in conjunction with the caravan as a runabout and work vehicle and whilst on a journey".

The Gypsy Horse breed as it is today is thought to have begun to take shape shortly after the Second World War. When the British Roma had first begun to live in vardoes around 1850, they used mules and cast off horses of any suitable breed to pull them. These later included coloured horses which had become unfashionable in mainstream society and were typically culled. Among these were a significant number of coloured Shire horses. Many of these ended up with Romanichal breeders, and by the 1950s, they were considered valuable status symbols within that culture. Spotted horses were very briefly in fashion around the time of the Second World War, but quickly went out of fashion in favour of the coloured horse, which has retained its popularity until the present day. The initial greater height of the breed derived from the influence of both Clydesdales and Shires.

In the formative years of the Gypsy Horse, the Romanichal bred not only for specific colour, profuse feather, and greater bone, but also for increased action and smaller size. To increase action at the trot, they first tried Hackney Pony breeding, but this blood reduced both feather and bone. The Roma therefore turned to the Section D Welsh Cob to add a more animated trot to the breed without loss of other desired traits. Another trend in breeding was a steady decrease in height, a trend still present among many Romani breeders. In the 1990s, the breed's average height still was in excess of 15 hands (60 inches, 152 cm), but horses of 14.3 to 15 hands (59 to 60 inches, 150 to 152 cm) were beginning to be viewed as more desirable, primarily for economic reasons. John Shaw, a carriage painter from Milnrow, Rochdale, Lancaster, was quoted in 1993 as saying, "Very big, hairy coloureds are now in vogue. They are status symbols . . . but they are not really an economical animal. They cost too much to feed, harness and shoe. . . and they don't stand up to the work. For that you want the vanner type of 14.3 to 15 hands (59 to 60 inches, 150 to 152 cm)"; larger horses require more fodder than smaller ones, as well as larger harnesses and horseshoes.

The breed most used by the Romani breeders to set not only the size but also the type of the future Gypsy Horse was the Dales Pony, described as "thick, strong, . . . active yet a great puller". The Dales, a draught pony, preserved the bone, feather, and pulling capabilities derived from the Shire and Clydesdale breeds but in a smaller and therefore more economical package. The Dales and, to a lesser extent, the Fell Pony interbred with the Shire and Clydesdale provided the basis of today's Gypsy Horse.

Since the Romani people who developed the Gypsy Horse communicated pedigree and breed information orally, information on foundation bloodstock and significant horses within the breed is mostly anecdotal. The two foundation sires of the breed are reportedly known as The Old Coal Horse and Sonny Mays' Horse. It is said that The Coal Horse goes back to a grey Shire stallion known as Shaw's Grey Horse of Scotland. The origins of the breed appear to be Irish, and the name Connors appears prominently in the breed history. In a poorly recorded interview, well-respected breeder Henry Connors gives some of the lineage of the horse. It includes horses with names such as Ben's of Bonafay, Jimmy Doyle's Horse of Ballymartin, Henry Connors' White Horse, The Lob Eared Horse, The Sham Horse, and Old Henry.

The Irish cob can be traced to the 18th century but also was long considered a type, not a breed, and varied somewhat in characteristics, though generally was bred for light draught and farm work but was also capable of being ridden. It originated from crossing Thoroughbred, Connemara pony, and Irish Draught horses.

The first known Gypsy Horses to come to America arrived in 1996, imported by Dennis and Cindy Thompson, who created the Gypsy Vanner name and started a breed society.

== Names ==
The breed is known by several names including Irish Cob, Gypsy Cob, Gypsy Vanner, and Tinker Cob, alluding to its association with the travelling community.

The first known importers of the Gypsy Horse to North America, Dennis and Cindy Thompson, viewed the breed as unnamed and chose the name "vanner", calling their association the Gypsy Vanner Horse Society. A "vanner" is a light draught horse suitable for pulling a horse-drawn van. Before the formation of the American society in 1996, the word "vanner" appears in two printed sources in association with these horses. In 1979, Harvey described a Roma-owned horse as "[a] fair-sized vanner, about 15.2hh (15 1/2 hands) high, . . . [c]ross-shire, with a touch of Clydesdale? Lineage is often hard to trace." Publishing in 1993 in the first known acknowledgment of the Gypsy Horse as a distinct breed outside Romani culture, Hart employs the term three times in reference to a Gypsy Horse, identifying specific Gypsy Horses as vanners.

Founded subsequently in 1998 and 2003, respectively, the Irish Cob Society and the Gypsy Cob Society of America referred to the breed as "Cob", the name used by its Romani breeders. The Gypsy Horse Association, incorporated in 2008, employed the name "Gypsy Horse" and states on its website that the organisation recognizes all breed names currently in use. Also in 2008, the GCSA renamed itself the Gypsy Horse Registry of America.

Breed associations in Belgium, Sweden, and the Netherlands are listed in the Universal equine life number database under the breed names "Tinker Horse" and "Tinker Pony."

== Registration ==
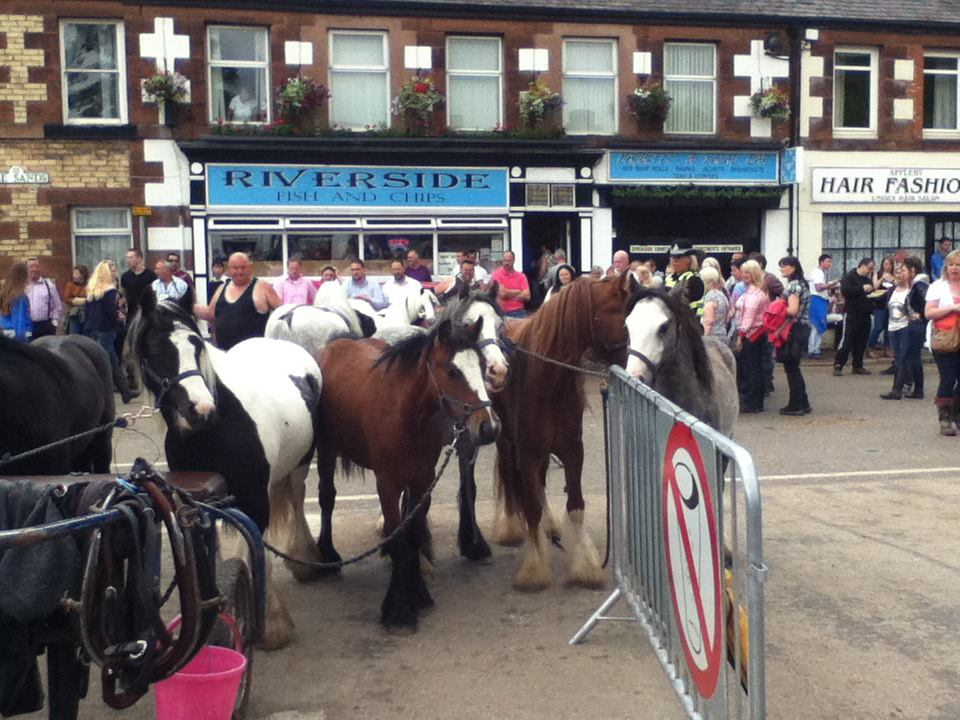
Horse-trading in The Sands in Appleby-in-Westmorland

Among the assorted associations and societies dedicated to the breed, there is some variety in services offered. The Gypsy Horse Registry of America includes size classifications in its stud book. The Gypsy Horse Association provides access to the identifying DNA markers, pedigrees (both anecdotal and DNA verified), and registration photos of most of its registered horses online and free of charge. The Gypsy Horse Association and the Gypsy Horse Registry of America provide online stud-books. The Gypsy Vanner Horse Society provides access to its stud-book for a fee. The GVHS also has inspections for registered horses and provides awards for year end points from approved shows.

Since registration for the Gypsy Horse has only existed within the last 20 years, most associations require a genetic analysis for registration, to verify identity and identify future offspring. All of the North American Gypsy Horse and Drum Horse societies employ the Animal Genetics Research Laboratory of the University of Kentucky to perform DNA analysis and maintain a database of registered horses' DNA markers. UKY currently tests markers at 17 loci of a horse's genetic makeup. The aim of this analysis is to either exclude or fail to exclude another horse as a parent. In a spirit of co-operation, the five American breed societies have jointly granted the University of Kentucky permission to employ their registered horses' DNA markers in confirming parentage of horses belonging to other registries. Since information regarding the past histories, including parentage, of many of the Gypsy Horses imported to North America was lost, many owners seek to reclaim the genetic roots of their animals, and services have sprung up to satisfy this desire.

Because many of the horses submitted for registration have never been registered, the American organisations evaluate horses for registration by way of photos and provenance information such as import papers and bills of sale.

Beginning in 2014, GVHS began restricting registration to horses sired by GVHS-registered stallions and out of mares whose DNA markers are available and confirm parentage. Only horses falling between 13 and 16 hands (52 and 64 inches, 132 and 163 cm) in height are eligible for registration, although the status of animals whose heights fall outside that range can be appealed to GVHS's board of directors.

The Netherlands stud book only allows full registration to offspring of horses previously registered with the NSvT; horses identified as Irish Cob, Gypsy Cob, Gypsy Vanner, Coloured Horse, Traveller Pony, Black and White, or Traditional Cob may be evaluated as potential breeding stock and, if suitable, recorded in a secondary register, with their offspring eligible for full registration. Horses must pass an inspection to be registered. The Irish Cob Society also requires an inspection process. The Gypsy Cob Register of the UK & Ireland, a registry run by the Travelling Community, has a DNA database and requires breeding stallions to have a DNA profile.

== Uses ==
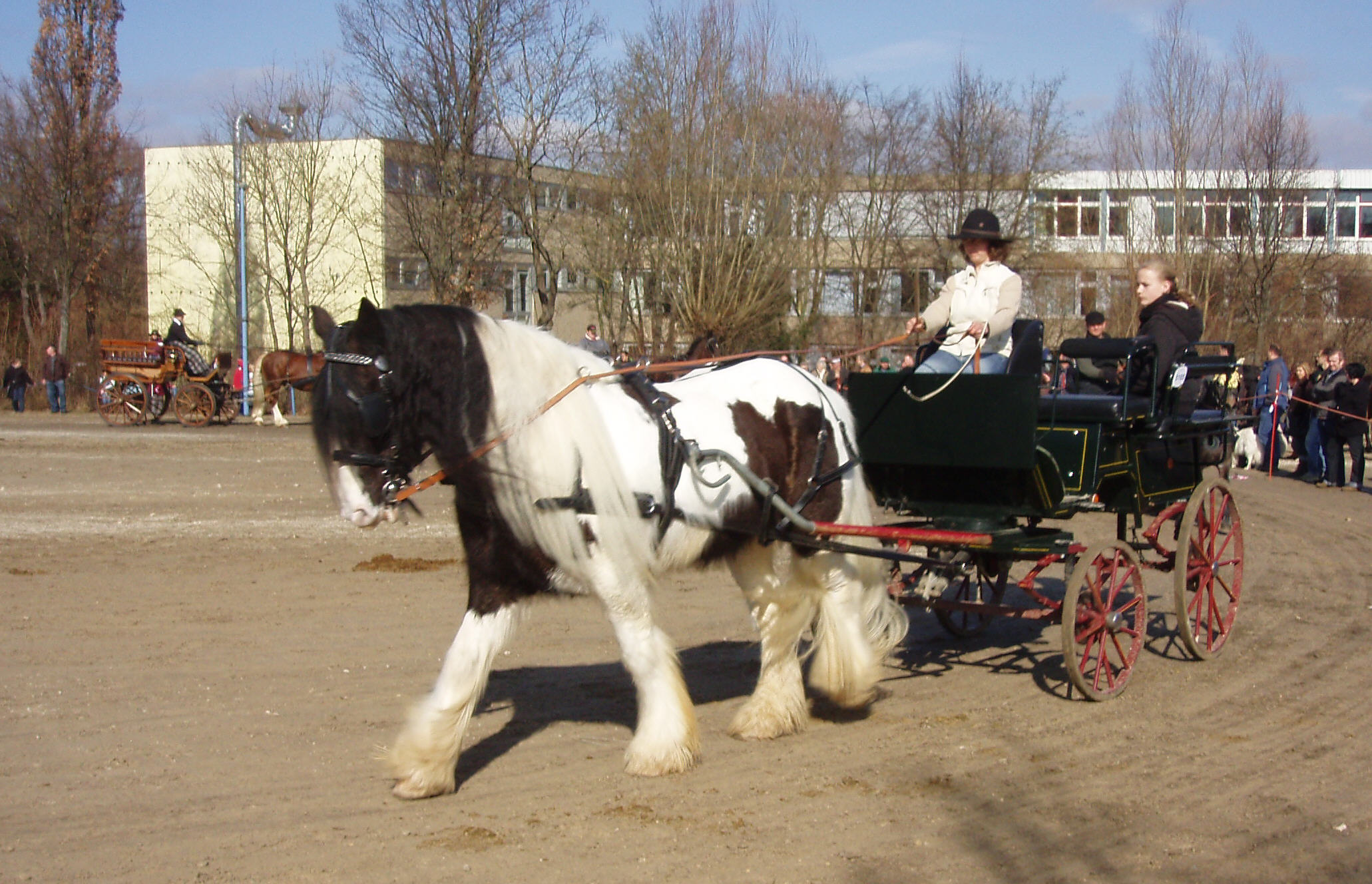
In harness

Gypsy Cobs are shown and traded at traditional horse fairs, of which the Appleby Horse Fair is the largest in Europe. Many Travellers and Romani travel to the fair in traditional horse-drawn caravans and vardos. American photographer John S. Hockensmith documented such a journey in 2004, travelling with and photographing the Harker family's 60-mile (97 km) journey to Appleby in bow-top living wagons.

In North America, the first known show classes dedicated to the Gypsy Horse were held at the Colorado Horse Park on 28–29 August 2004, employing the breed standard of the Gypsy Cob Society of America, now the Gypsy Horse Registry of America. The first Gypsy breed show, the Ohio State Fair Gypsy Vanner Horse Show, sponsored by the Gypsy Vanner Horse Society, was held in 2005 in Columbus, Ohio. Currently there are a number of breed shows for the Gypsy Horse in the US and Canada.

In the United States, the Gypsy Horse is used in many equestrian sports, by amateurs and youths. In 2004, the United States Dressage Federation accepted the Gypsy Vanner Horse Society as an affiliate member, allowing horses registered with GVHS to compete in its dressage and dressage-related events. The Gypsy Horse Association was accepted into the USDF programme in 2008; two other coloured horse associations had joined by 2011.
