= Chronic progressive lymphedema =

Disease of draft horses

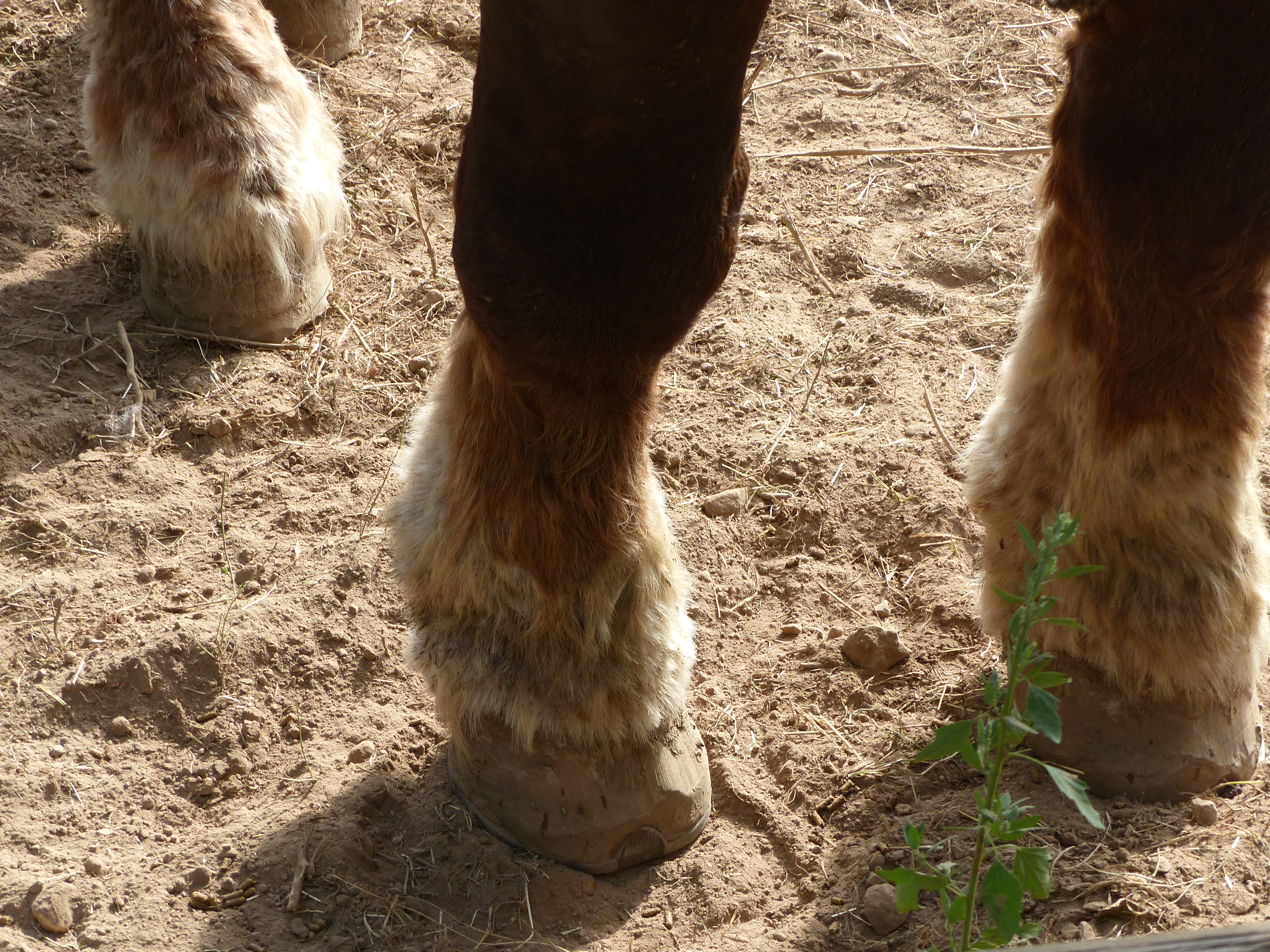
Foot of a draft horse

Chronic progressive lymphedema (CPL) is a disease of some breeds of draft horse, whereby the lower legs becomes progressively more swollen. There is no cure; the aim of treatment is to manage the signs and slow progression of the disease. The cause of CPL is not known, although it is suspected that a genetic disorder of elastin metabolism prevents the lymphatic vessels from functioning properly, leading to edema of the lower limbs. CPL resembles the human disease elephantiasis verrucosa nostra.

== Signs ==
CPL is a progressive disease, which begins below the fetlock and gradually moves up the leg. All legs are affected, the hindlimbs usually more seriously so. Initial signs include thickening, crusting and folding of the skin. These early signs may be hidden by the long hair (feather) on the horse's lower legs. Affected areas are itchy, causing the horse to stamp its feet and rub its legs, and painful, so that the horse may be reluctant to allow its legs to be touched. As CPL progresses, ulcers develop on the pasterns, and fibrosis leads to hardening of the skin and the development of nodules which may become baseball sized. Secondary infections with microbes or mites commonly cause complications. Infestations with the mange mite Chorioptes equi are very itchy, and lead to self-trauma and dermatitis.

The quality of the hoof is often poor; hooves are prone to cracks, splits and the development of thrush and abscesses; horses may develop laminitis. Chestnuts and ergots are often misshapen and irregular.

== Management ==
There is no cure for CPL; the aim of treatment is to relieve the signs of the disease, and to slow the progression. Management requires daily care to prevent infection of the affected skin. The first step is to trim the feather from the lower leg, to ensure no affected areas are missed, and to allow application of treatments directly to the affected skin. Bacterial infections can be treated by gentle washing and drying of the skin. Topical treatments are required to treat chorioptic mange (caused by the mite Chorioptes equi), as the mites are not vulnerable to oral or systemic treatments when they are within the crusts on the skin. Daily exercise assists with the flow of lymph. Combined decongestive therapy involves massage of the leg to move the lymph, followed by specialized compression bandaging which creates a pressure gradient up the leg.

Horses with CPL often have poor-quality hoof, so regular trimming is required to help keep the hoof healthy.

== Epidemiology ==
Affected breeds include the Shire, Clydesdale, Belgian, Gypsy cob, and Friesian. Signs are usually only seen in horses older than two years. Both sexes are affected.
