= Clydesdale horse =

Horse breed

Clydesdale
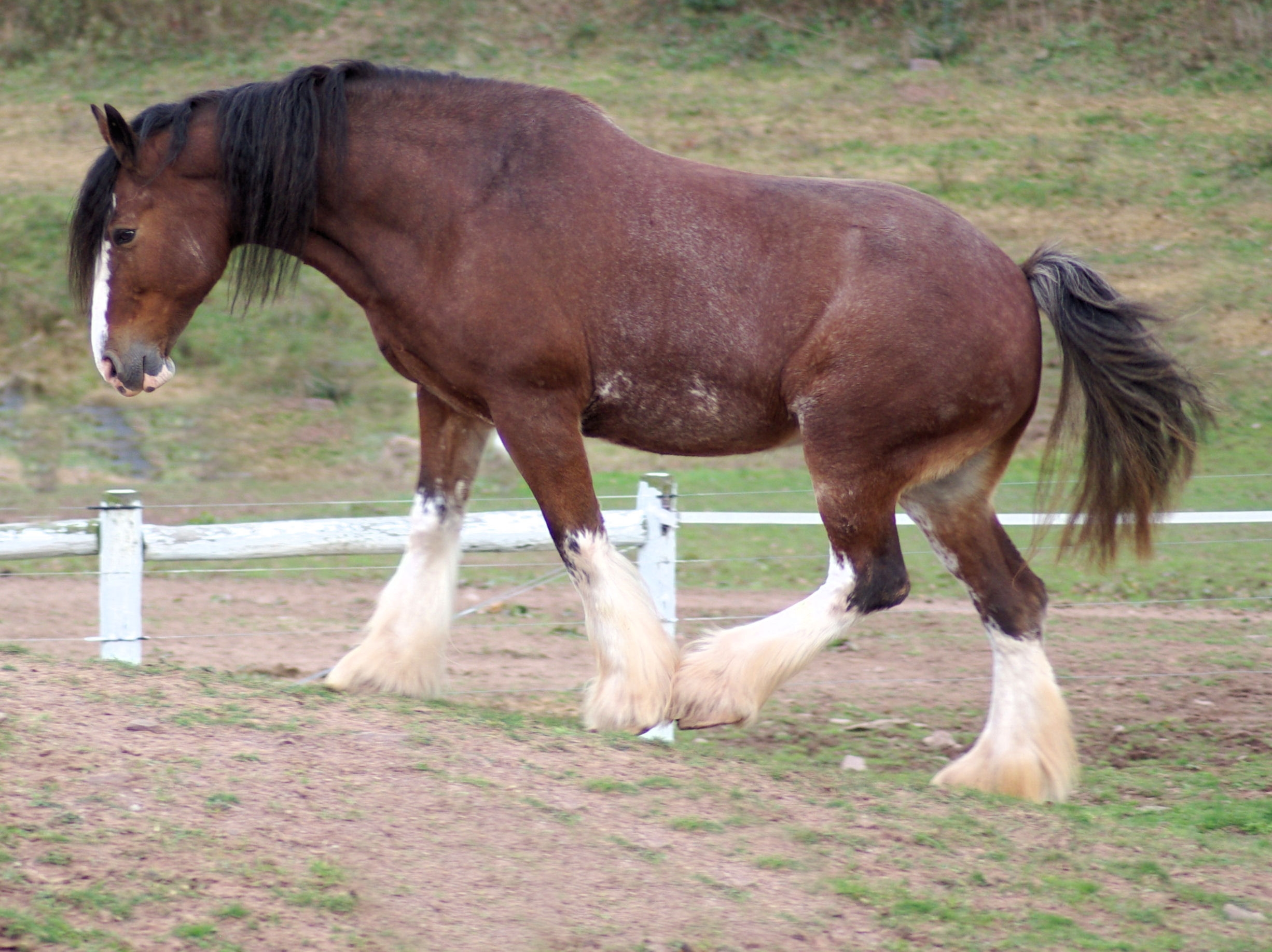

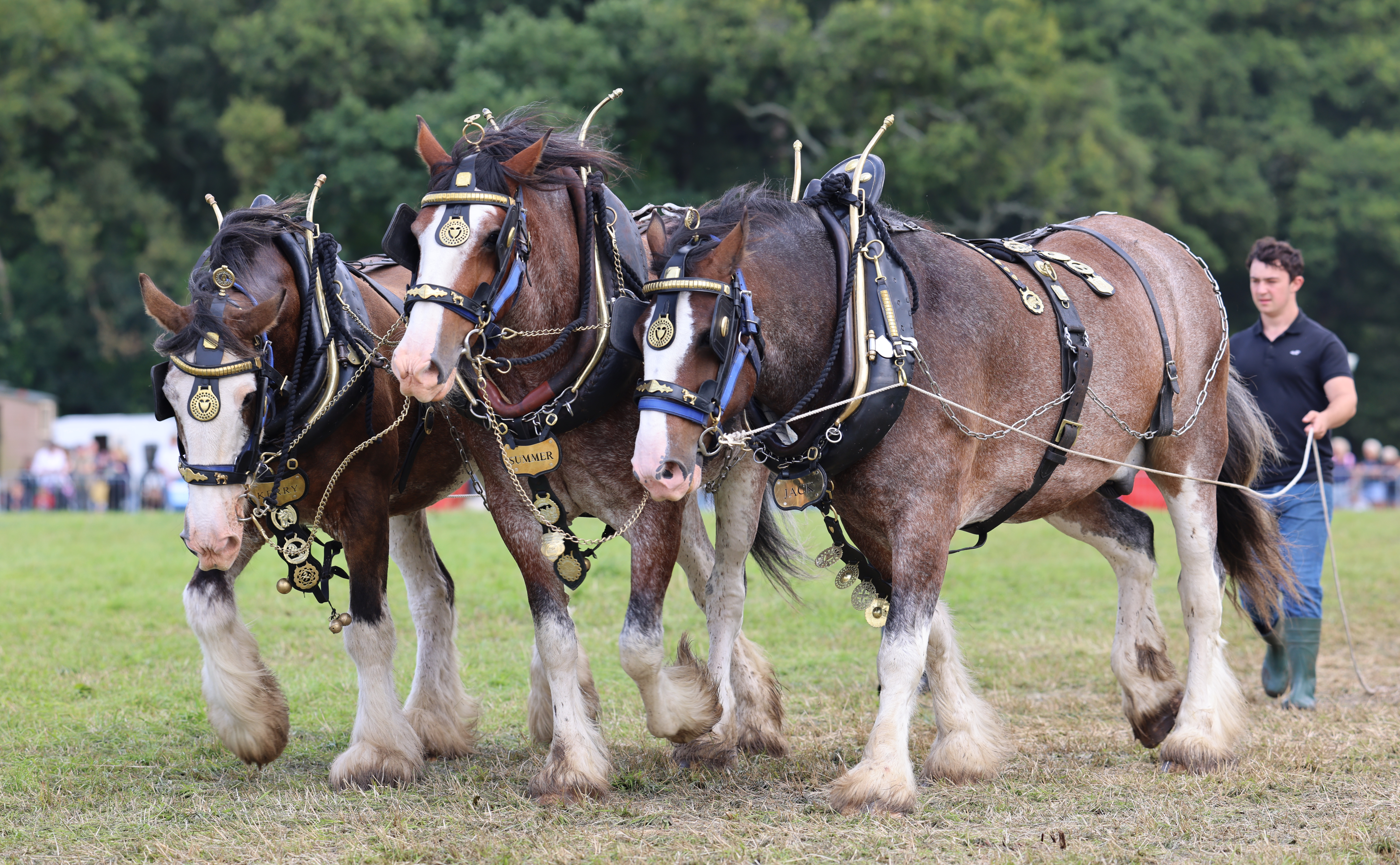
- Conservation status: FAO (2007): not at risk (worldwide); DAD-IS (2020): at risk (worldwide); RBST (2020): vulnerable (UK)
- Country of origin: Scotland

Traits
- Weight: 700–1,000 kg (1,500–2,200 lb)
- Height: 167 to 183 centimetres (16.1 1/2 to 18.0 hands; 65 1/2 to 72 in)
- Colour: Usually bay, brown or roan with white blaze and white legs
- Distinguishing features: Feathered legs

Breed standards
- Commonwealth Clydesdale Horse Society Australia; Clydesdale Horse Society (UK)

The Clydesdale is a breed of draught horse which originated in the seventeenth century, and takes its name from the Clydesdale district of Scotland. The first recorded use of the name "Clydesdale" for the breed was in 1826; the horses spread through much of Scotland and into northern England. After the breed society was formed in 1877, thousands of Clydesdales were exported to other countries, particularly to Australia and New Zealand. In the early twentieth century numbers began to fall, both because many were taken for use in the First World War, and because of the increasing mechanisation of agriculture. By the 1970s, the Rare Breeds Survival Trust considered the breed vulnerable to extinction. Numbers have since increased slightly.

Clydesdales are large and powerful, although now not as heavy as in the past. They were traditionally used for draught power, both in farming and in road haulage. They are now principally used as carriage horses, and may be ridden or driven in parades or processions. The Anheuser-Busch brewery has several matched teams of eight horses which they tour internationally for publicity, known as the Budweiser Clydesdales.

== Characteristics ==
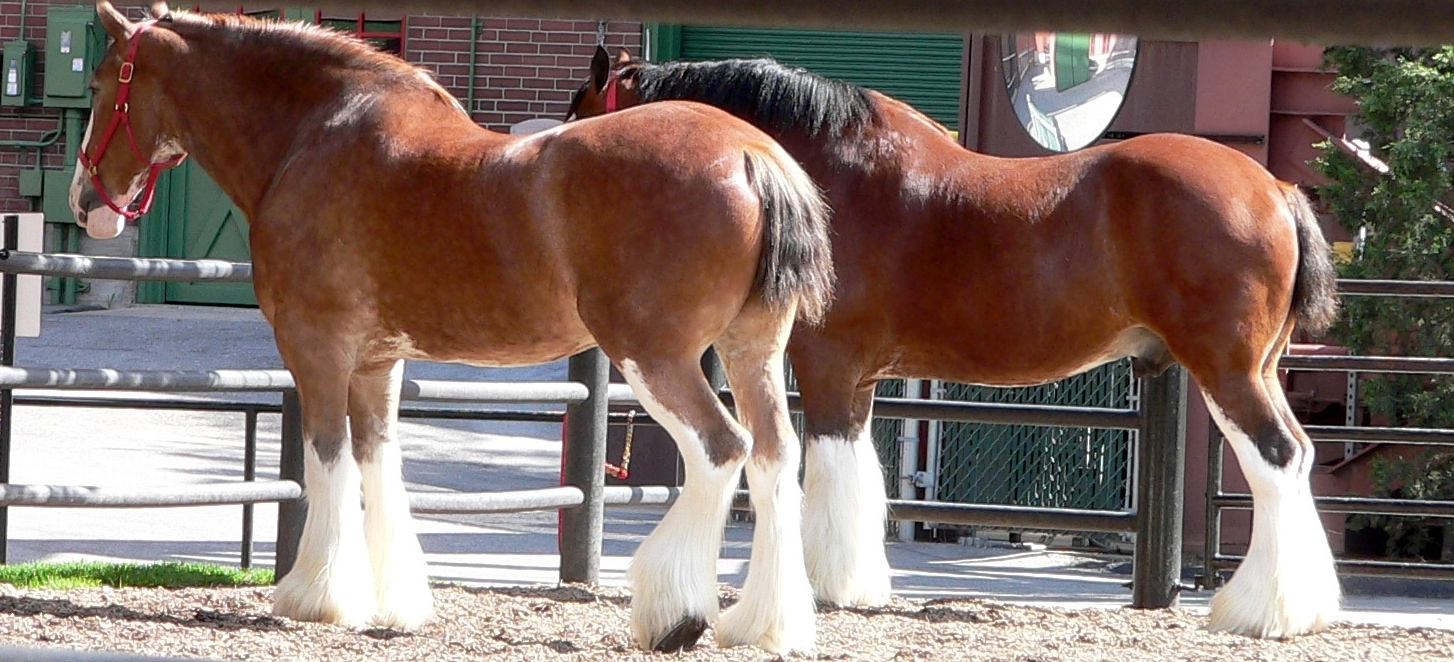
Clydesdales

The conformation of the Clydesdale has changed greatly throughout its history. In the 1920s and 1930s, it was a compact horse smaller than the Shire, Percheron, and Belgian Draught. Beginning in the 1940s, breeding animals were selected to produce taller horses that looked more impressive in parades and shows. Today, the Clydesdale stands 162 to 183 cm (16.0 to 18.0 h) high and weighs 820 to 910 kg (1800 to 2000 lb). Some mature males are larger, standing taller than 183 cm and weighing up to 1000 kg (2200 lb). The breed has a straight facial profile or a slight Roman nose, broad forehead, and wide muzzle.

The horses are well-muscled and strong, with an arched neck, high withers, and a sloped shoulder. Breed associations pay close attention to the quality of the hooves and legs, as well as the general movement. Their gaits are active, with clearly lifted hooves and a general impression of power and quality. Clydesdales are energetic, with a manner described by the Clydesdale Horse Society as a "gaiety of carriage and outlook".

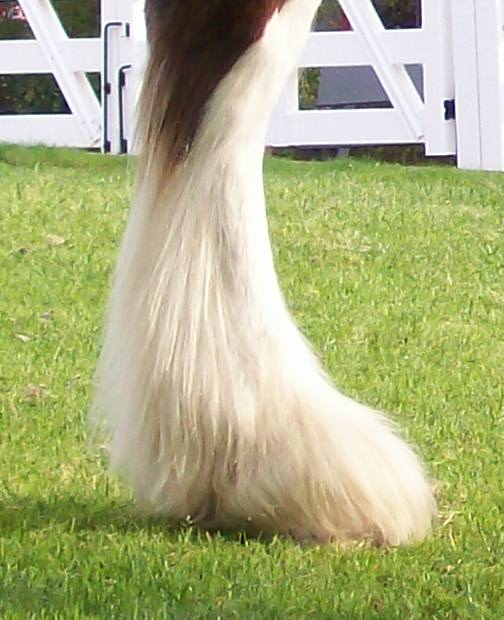
A Clydesdale's feathered leg

Clydesdales are usually bay or brown in colour. Roans are common, and black, grey and chestnut also occur. Most have white markings, including white on the face, feet, and legs, and occasional white patches on the body (generally on the lower belly). They have extensive feathering on their lower legs. Cow hocks, where the hocks turn inward are a breed characteristic and not considered a fault in breed shows.

Many buyers pay a premium for bay and black horses, especially those with four white legs and white facial markings. Specific colours are often preferred over other physical traits, and some buyers even choose horses with soundness problems if they have the desired colour and markings. Buyers do not favour Sabino-like horses, despite one draught-breed writer theorising that they are needed to keep the desired coat colours and texture. Breed associations, however, state that no colour is bad, and that horses with roaning and body spots are increasingly accepted.

Clydesdales have been identified to be at risk for chronic progressive lymphedema, a disease with clinical signs that include progressive swelling, hyperkeratosis, and fibrosis of distal limbs that is similar to chronic lymphedema in humans. Another health concern is a skin condition on the lower leg where feathering is heavy. Colloquially called "Clyde's itch", it is thought to be caused by a type of mange. Clydesdales are also known to develop sunburn on any pink (unpigmented) skin around their faces.

== Breed history ==
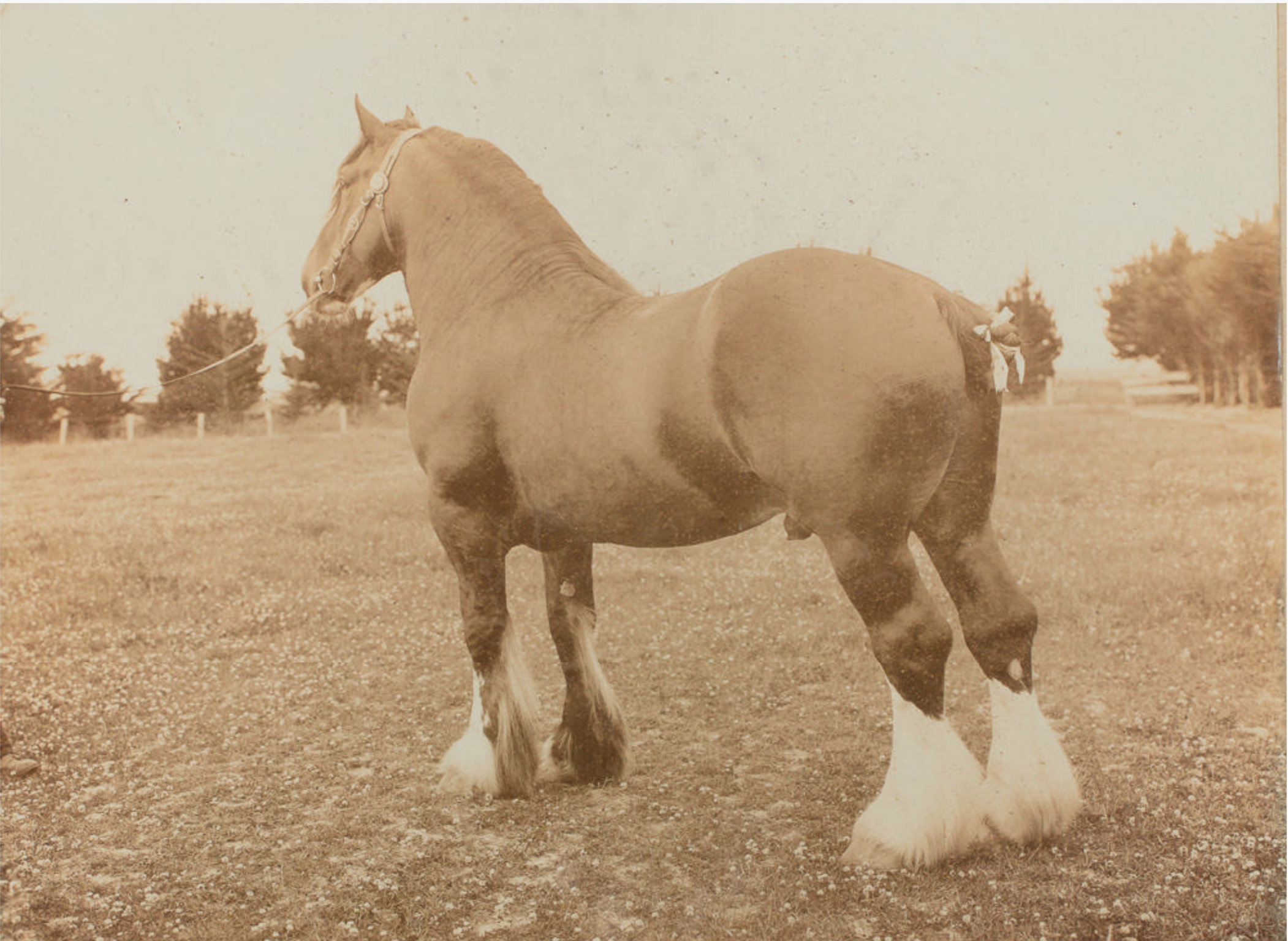
Stallion, New Zealand (1900s)

The Clydesdale horse takes its name from Clydesdale, the valley of the River Clyde. In the late seventeenth century, stallions of Friesian and Flemish stock from the Low Countries were imported to Scotland and bred to local mares. These included a black unnamed stallion imported from England by a John Paterson of Lochlyloch and an unnamed dark-brown stallion owned by the Duke of Hamilton.

Another prominent stallion was a 165 cm (16.1 h) coach horse stallion of unknown lineage named Blaze. Written pedigrees were kept of these foals beginning in the early nineteenth century, and in 1806, a filly, later known as "Lampits mare" after the farm name of her owner, was born that traced her lineage to the black stallion. This mare is listed in the ancestry of almost every Clydesdale living today. One of her foals was Thompson's Black Horse (known as Glancer), which was to have a significant influence on the Clydesdale breed.

The first recorded use of the name "Clydesdale" in reference to the breed was in 1826 at an exhibition in Glasgow. Another theory of their origin, that of them descending from Flemish horses brought to Scotland as early as the 15th century, was also promulgated in the late 18th century. However, even the author of that theory admitted that the common story of their ancestry is more likely.

A system of hiring stallions between districts existed in Scotland, with written records dating back to 1837. This programme consisted of local agriculture improvement societies holding breed shows to choose the best stallion, whose owner was then awarded a monetary prize. The owner was then required, in return for additional monies, to take the stallion throughout a designated area, breeding to the local mares. Through this system and by purchase, Clydesdale stallions were sent throughout Scotland and into northern England.

Through extensive crossbreeding with local mares, these stallions spread the Clydesdale type throughout the areas where they were placed, and by 1840, Scottish draught horses and the Clydesdale were one and the same. In 1877, the Clydesdale Horse Society of Scotland was formed, followed in 1879 by the American Clydesdale Association (later renamed the Clydesdale Breeders of the USA), which served both U.S. and Canadian breed enthusiasts. The first American stud book was published in 1882. In 1883, the short-lived Select Clydesdale Horse Society was founded to compete with the Clydesdale Horse Society. It was started by two breeders dedicated to improving the breed, who also were responsible in large part for the introduction of Shire blood into the Clydesdale.

Large numbers of Clydesdales were exported from Scotland in the late nineteenth and early twentieth centuries, with 1617 stallions leaving the country in 1911 alone. Between 1884 and 1945, export certificates were issued for 20,183 horses. These horses were exported to other countries in the British Empire, as well as North and South America, continental Europe, and Russia.

The First World War had the conscription of thousands of horses for the war effort, and after the war, breed numbers declined as farms became increasingly mechanised. This decline continued between the wars. Following the Second World War, the number of Clydesdale breeding stallions in England dropped from more than 200 in 1946 to 80 in 1949. By 1975, the Rare Breeds Survival Trust considered them vulnerable to extinction, meaning fewer than 900 breeding females remained in the UK.

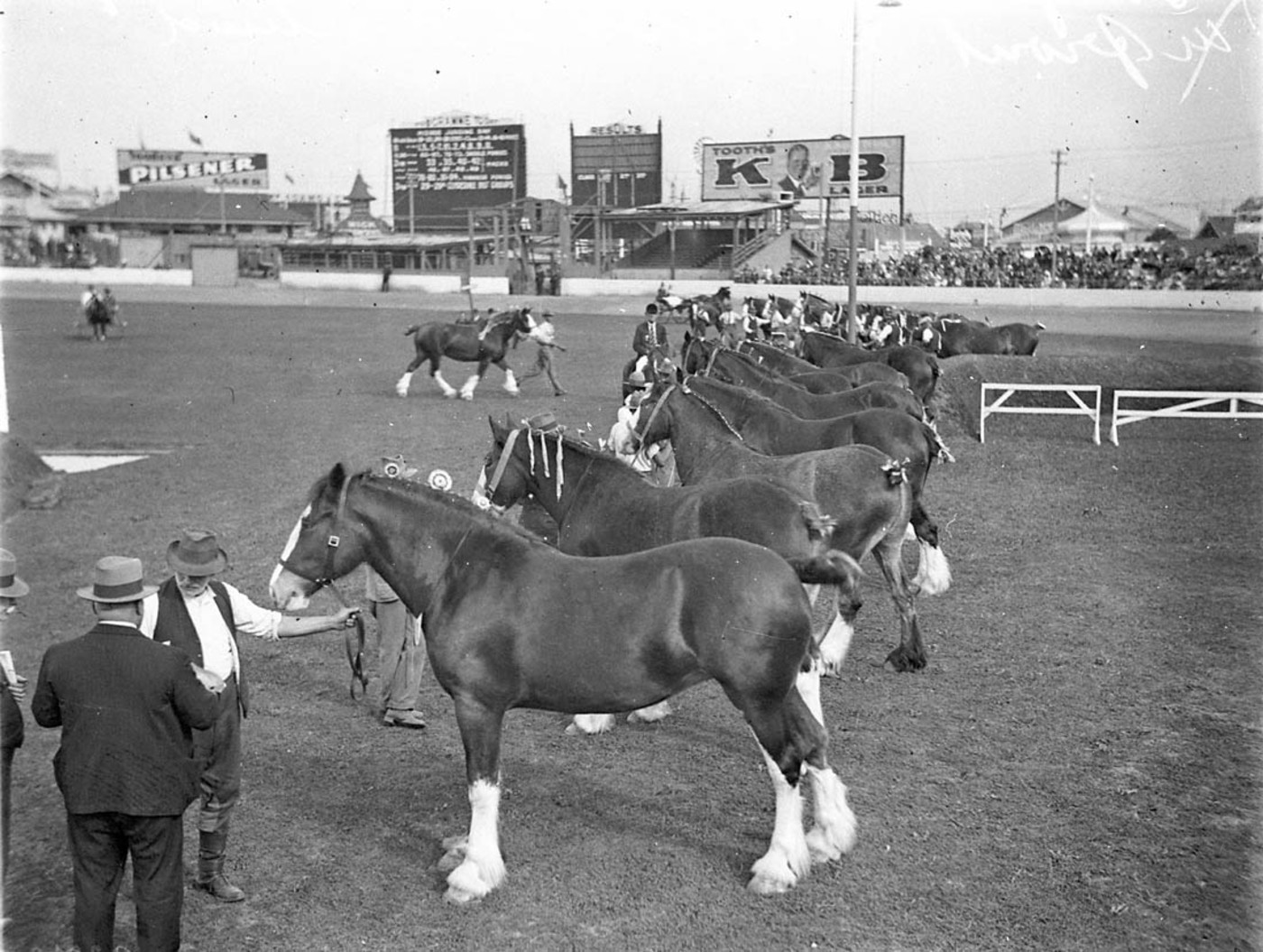
Clydesdales, Australia (ca. 1925-1957)

Many of the horses exported from Scotland in the nineteenth and twentieth centuries went to Australia and New Zealand. In 1918, the Commonwealth Clydesdale Horse Society was formed as the association for the breed in Australia. Between 1906 and 1936, Clydesdales were bred so extensively in Australia that other draught breeds were almost unknown. By the late 1960s, it was noted that "Excellent Clydesdale horses are bred in Victoria and New Zealand; but, at least in the former place, it is considered advisable to keep up the type by frequent importations from England." Over 25,000 Clydesdales were registered in Australia between 1924 and 2008. The popularity of the Clydesdale led to it being called "the breed that built Australia".

=== Conservation status ===
In the 1990s, numbers began to rise. By 2005, the Rare Breeds Survival Trust had moved the breed to "at risk" status, meaning that there were fewer than 1,500 breeding females in the UK, but by 2010 had changed the status back to "vulnerable".

In 2010, the worldwide Clydesdale horse population was estimated to be 5,000, with around 4,000 in the United States and Canada, 800 in the UK, and the rest in other countries, including Russia, Japan, Germany, and South Africa.. The same year, the Clydesdale was listed as "watch" by The Livestock Conservancy, meaning that fewer than 2500 horses were registered annually in the USA, and there were fewer than 10,000 worldwide. By 2024, the Clydesdale was listed as "threatened" (<1,000 annual US registrations and <5,000 global population). According to The Livestock Conservancy, "The North American population of Clydesdale horses had increased steadily for several decades, but a sharp decline began around 2010, prompted by the economic downturn that affected the entire equine market. Globally, the breed is well-known, but not common, with an estimated global population of fewer than 5,000 horses."

== Uses ==
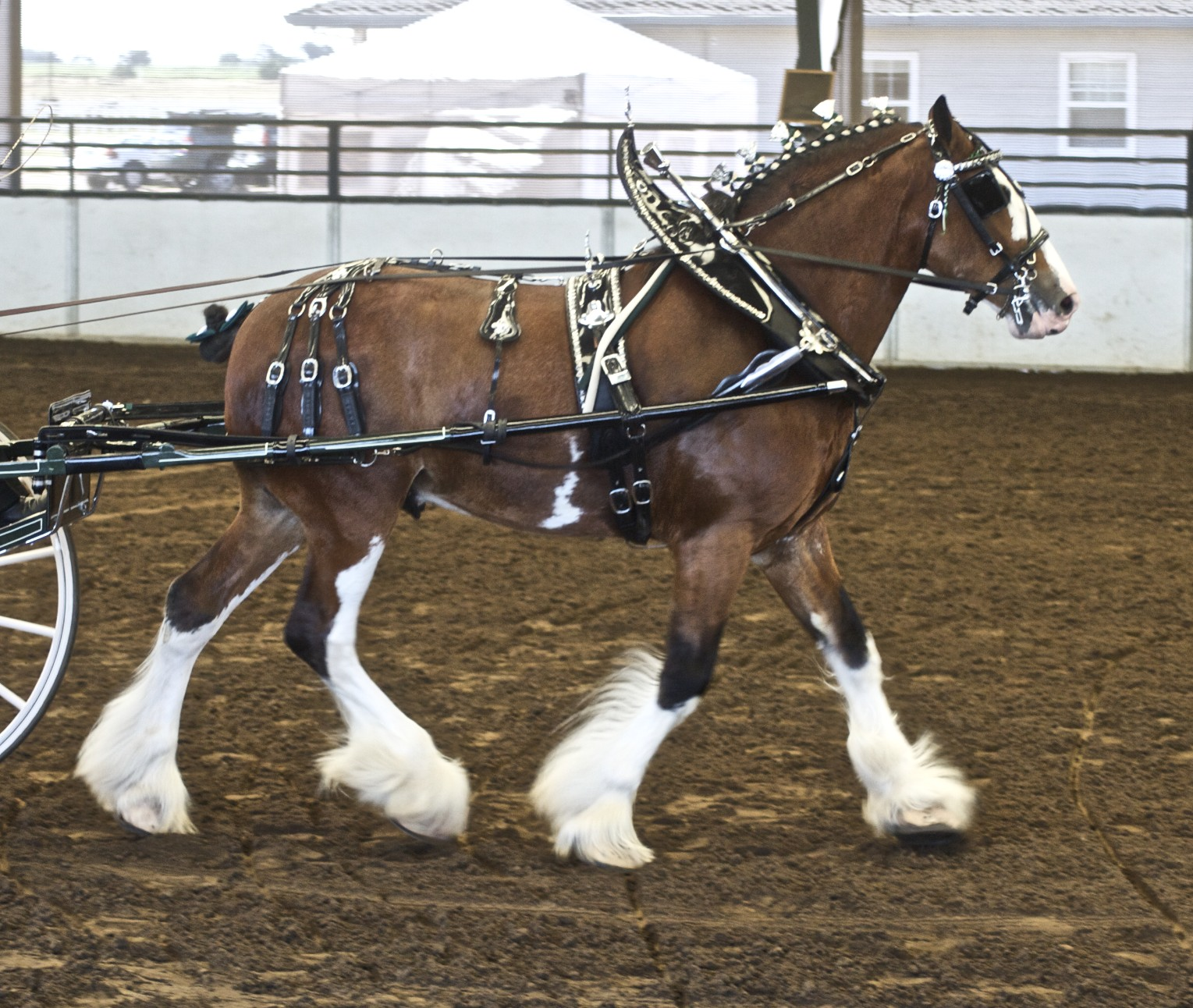
Clydesdale in harness

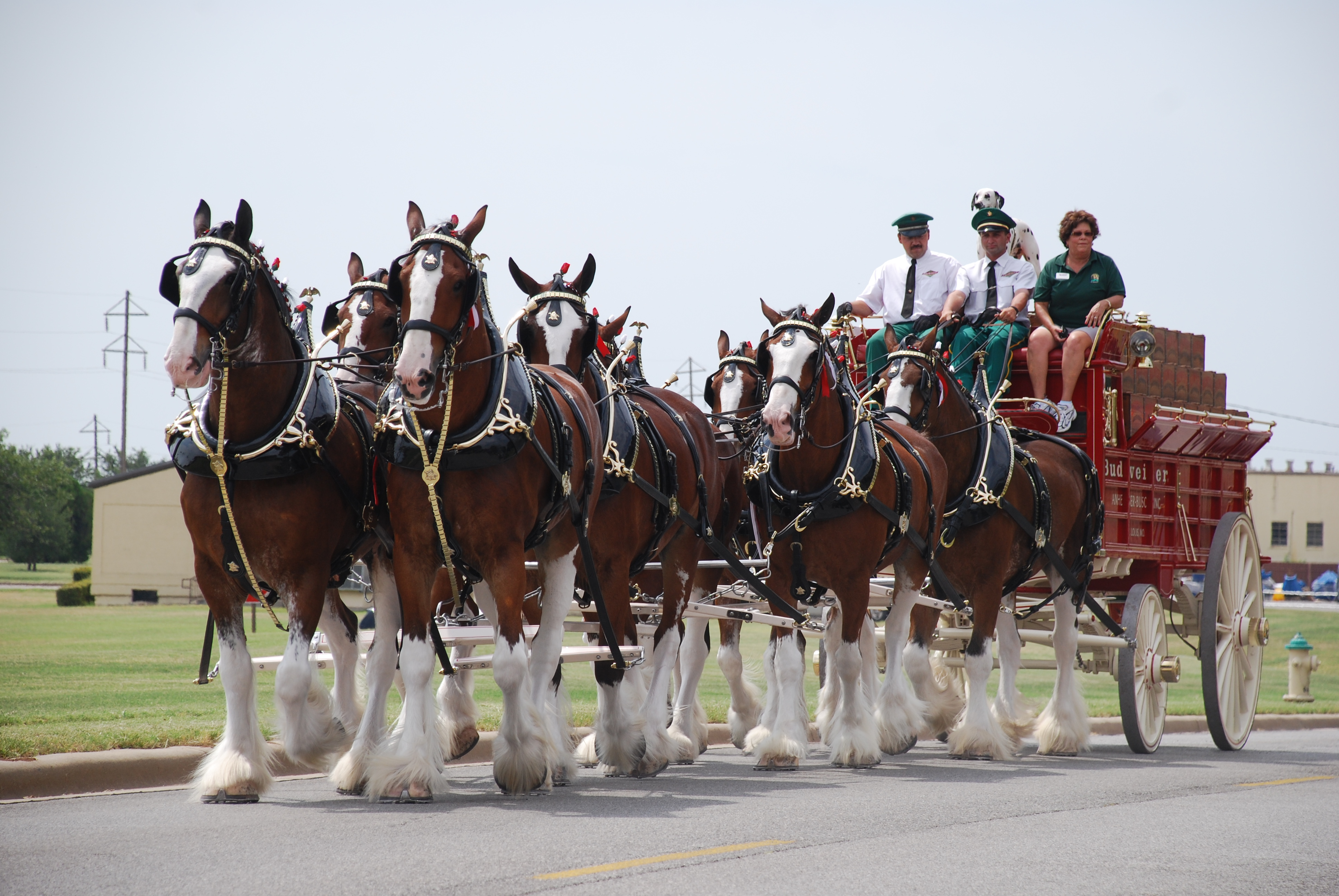
The Budweiser Clydesdales

The Clydesdale was originally used for agriculture, hauling coal in Lanarkshire, and heavy hauling in Glasgow. Today, Clydesdales are still used for draught purposes, including agriculture, logging, and driving. They are also shown and ridden, as well as kept for pleasure. Clydesdales are known to be the popular breed choice with carriage services and parade horses because of their white, feathered legs.

Along with carriage horses, Clydesdales are also used as show horses. They are shown in lead line and harness classes at county and state fairs, as well as national exhibitions. Some of the most famous members of the breed are the teams that make up the hitches of the Budweiser Clydesdales. The Budweiser Brewery first formed these teams at the end of Prohibition, and they have since become an international symbol of both the breed and the brand. The Budweiser breeding programme, with its strict standards of colour and conformation, have influenced the look of the breed in the United States to the point that many people believe that Clydesdales are always bay with white markings.

== Influence on other breeds ==
In the second half of the 1800s, Clydesdale and Shire blood was added to the Irish Draught breed in an attempt to reinvigorate that declining breed. However, those efforts were not seen as successful, as Irish Draught breeders thought the Clydesdale blood made their horses coarser and prone to lower leg faults, such as tied-in below the knee.

The Australian Draught horse was created using European draft breeds, including the Clydesdale, imported in the late 1800s.

In the early 1900s it was considered profitable to breed Clydesdale stallions to Dales Pony mares to create a mid-sized draught horses for pulling commercial wagons and military artillery. Unfortunately, after just a few years, the Dales breed was two-thirds Clydesdale. They started a breed registry in 1916 to preserve the Dales, and by 1923 the Army was buying only Dales with no signs of carthorse blood. The modern Dales shows no signs of Clydesdale characteristics.

The Clydesdale contributed to the development of the Gypsy horse in Great Britain along with Friesian, Shire and Dale, although no written records were kept.

== See also ==
- The Kelpies
