= Feathering (horse) =

Hair on the lower legs of horses

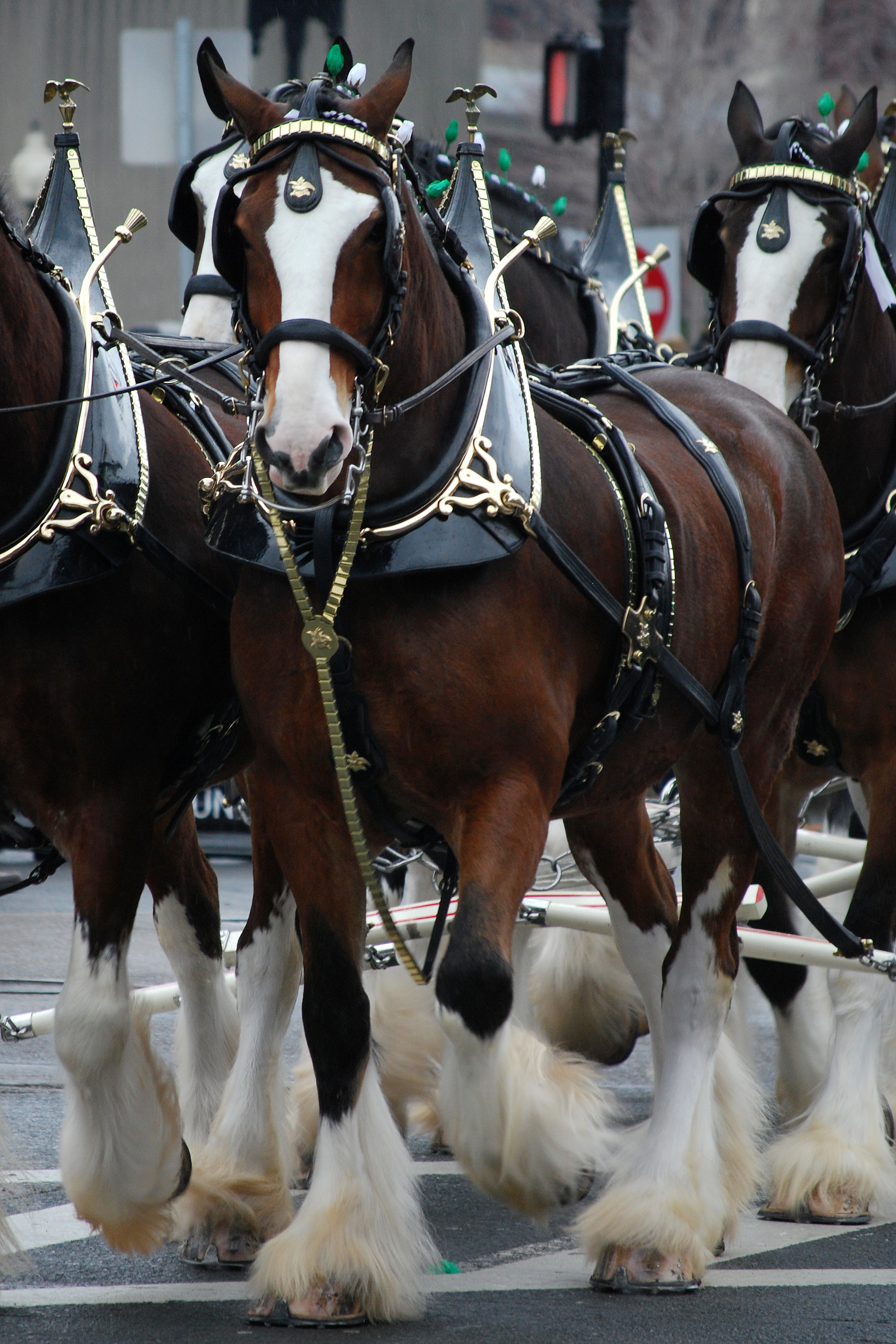
The Clydesdale is an example of a draught horse breed with feathering.

Feathering or feather is the long hair on the lower legs of some breeds of horse and pony. On some horses, especially draught breeds, the hair can almost cover the hooves. While nearly all horses will grow longer hair on the lower legs and back of the fetlocks at times, particularly in the winter, "feather" refers to the particularly long growth that is characteristic of certain breeds.

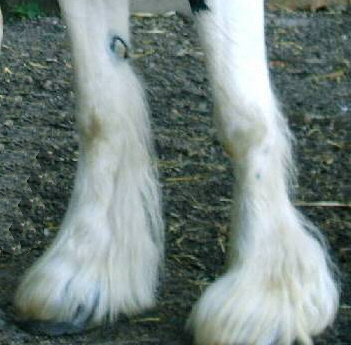
Feathering on the lower legs of a horse

Feathering is a characteristic trait of many of the mountain and moorland pony breeds of the United Kingdom as well as draught breeds such as the Clydesdale, Shire, Friesian, Ardennes horse and Irish Cob. The trait may appear in crossbreds of these breeds, though to date there has been little scientific study of the trait.

== Grooming ==
Feathers can be trimmed with scissors, and if the feathering continues down the hoof, the coronet band can be trimmed as well. It is recommended, however, that the back of the tendons only be trimmed if the feathering is in excess. Only soft brushes should be used on feathers, as the hair is long and fine-textured, and thus can break easily.

== Effect on health ==
Feathering protects the horse's legs from cold and mud. It also allows the breed to work for longer without sweating as much. Horses with thick feathering are more susceptible to mite infestations. Leg injuries may also be harder to notice when feathering is present.
