= Shire horse =

British breed of horse

Shire
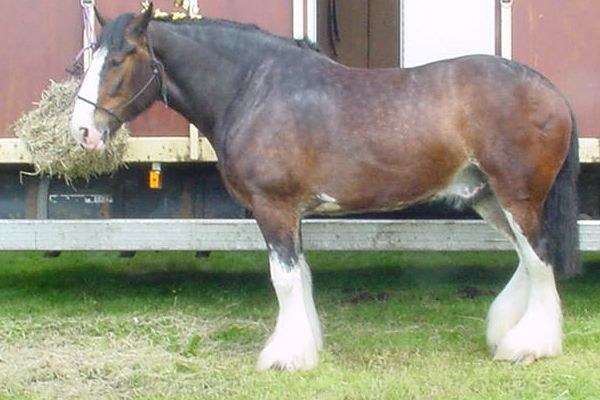

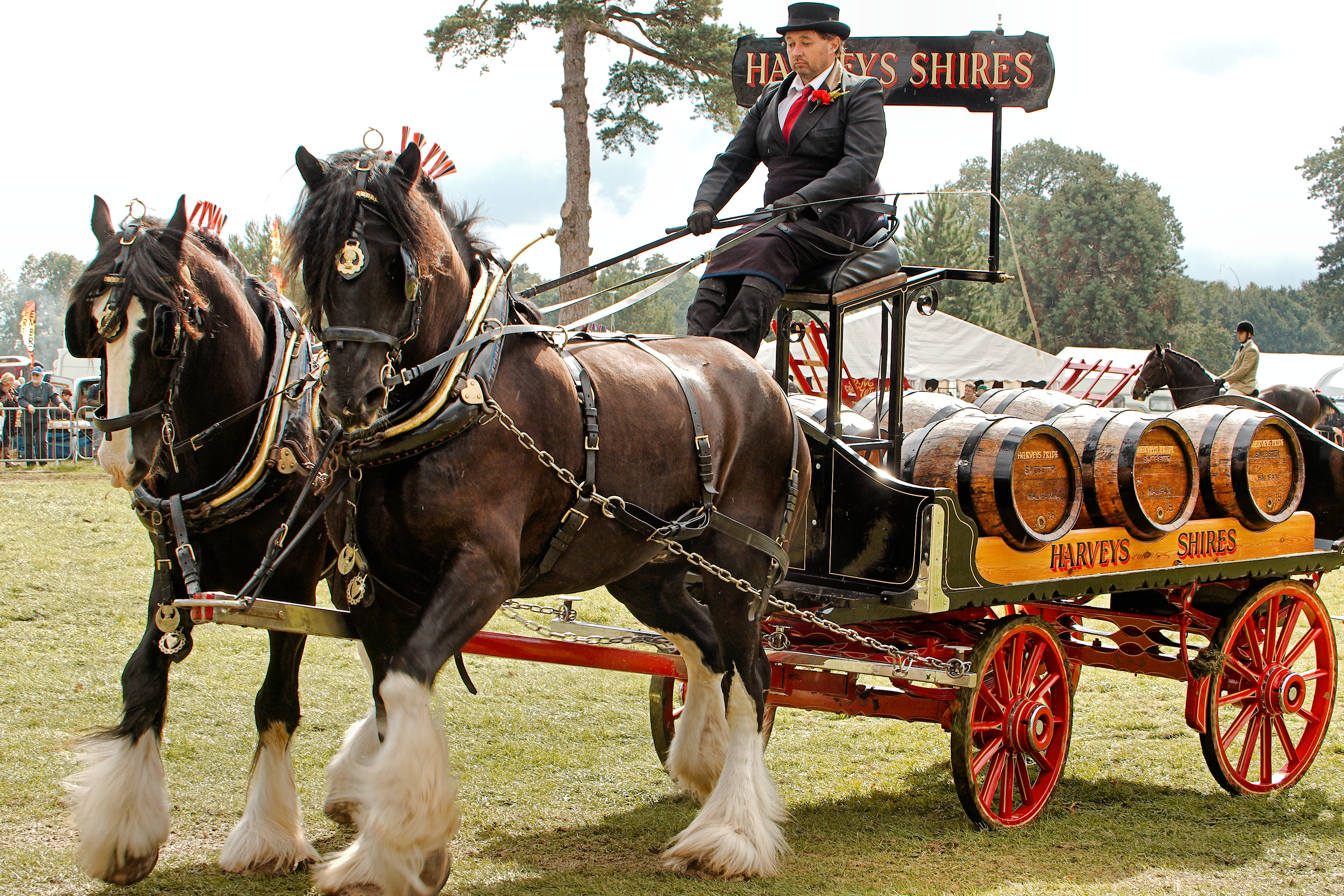
- Conservation status: At risk (RBST, 2016)
- Country of origin: United Kingdom
- Distribution: United Kingdom; Australia; Canada; United States
- Use: draught, show

Traits
- Weight: stallions 900–1100 kg; geldings 850–1100 kg
- Height: stallion 173 cm (17.0 hands) minimum; gelding 168 cm (16.2 h) minimum; mare 163 cm (16.0 h) minimum
- Colour: bay, black, brown or grey
- Distinguishing features: large size; draught conformation; feathered legs

Breed standards
- Shire Horse Society; American Shire Horse Association; Shire Horse Society of Australia

The Shire is a breed of draught horse originating from England. The Shire has a great capacity for weight-pulling; it was used for farm work, to tow barges at a time when the canal system was the principal means of goods transport, and as a cart-horse for road transport. One traditional use was for pulling brewer's drays for delivery of beer, and some are still used in this way; others are used for forestry and for commercial advertising. Shires have held some of the world records for the largest horse and for the tallest horse.

The Shire breed was established in the mid-eighteenth century in England, and a breed society and stud-book were established in the 1870s. Today, there are stud-books and breed associations in the United Kingdom, Australia, the United States, and Canada.

In the late nineteenth and early twentieth centuries, there were large numbers of Shires, and many were exported to the United States. With the progressive mechanisation of agriculture and of transport, the need for draught horses decreased rapidly and by the 1960s numbers had fallen from a million or more to a few thousand. Numbers began to increase again from the 1970s, but the breed is still considered "at risk" by the Rare Breeds Survival Trust.

== Characteristics ==
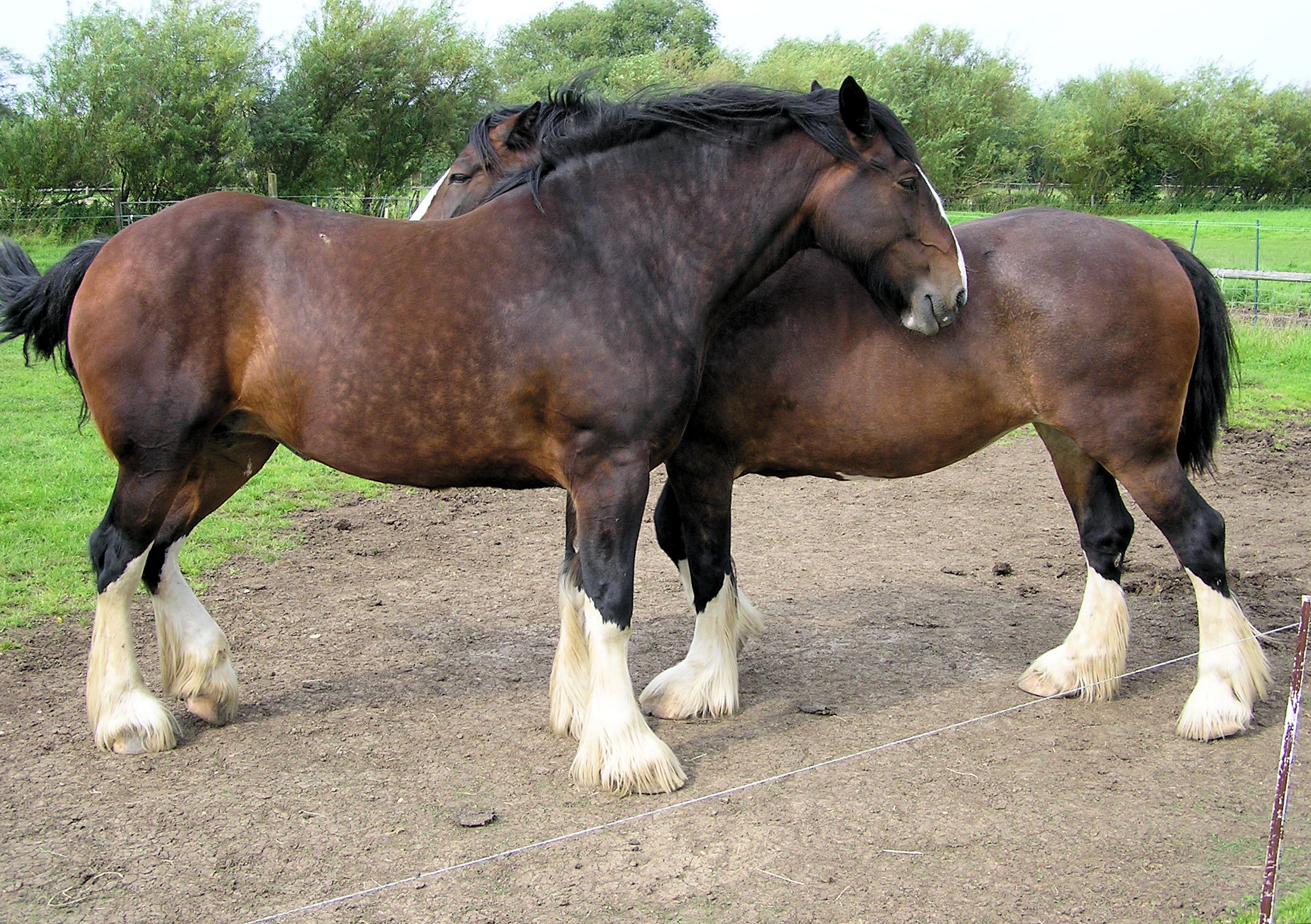
Shire mares, 2007

Shire stallions may be black, bay, brown or grey. They may not be roan or have large amounts of white markings. Mares and geldings may be black, bay, brown, grey or roan. In the UK stallions may not be chestnut, but the colour is allowed by the US association.

The average height at the withers of grown stallions is about 178 cm (17.2 hands), with a minimum of 173 cm (17.0 h); geldings should stand at least 168 cm (16.2 h), and mares no less than 163 cm (16.0 h). Weight ranges from 850 to 1100 kg (1870 to 2430 lb) for geldings and stallions, with no set standard for mares.

The head of a Shire is long and lean, with large eyes, set on a neck that is slightly arched and long in proportion to the body. The shoulder is deep and wide, the chest wide, the back muscular and short and the hindquarters long and wide. Not too much feathering is to occur on the legs, and the hair is fine, straight, and silky.

The Shire is known for its easy-going temperament.

The Shire has an enormous capacity for pulling weight. In 1924, at a British exhibition, a pair of horses was estimated to have pulled a starting load equal to 50 tonnes, although an exact number could not be determined as their pull exceeded the maximum reading on the dynamometer. Working in slippery footing, the same pair of horses pulled 18.5 tonnes at a later exhibition.

The tallest and heaviest horse in recorded history was probably a Shire gelding named Sampson (also known as Mammoth), foaled in the UK in 1846. He stood over 219.7 cm (21.2 h), and weighed an estimated 1524 kilograms (3360 lb).

Shires have been identified to be at risk for chronic progressive lymphedema, a chronic progressive disease that includes symptoms of progressive swelling, hyperkeratosis, and fibrosis of distal limbs. The disease is similar to chronic lymphedema in humans.

== Breed history ==
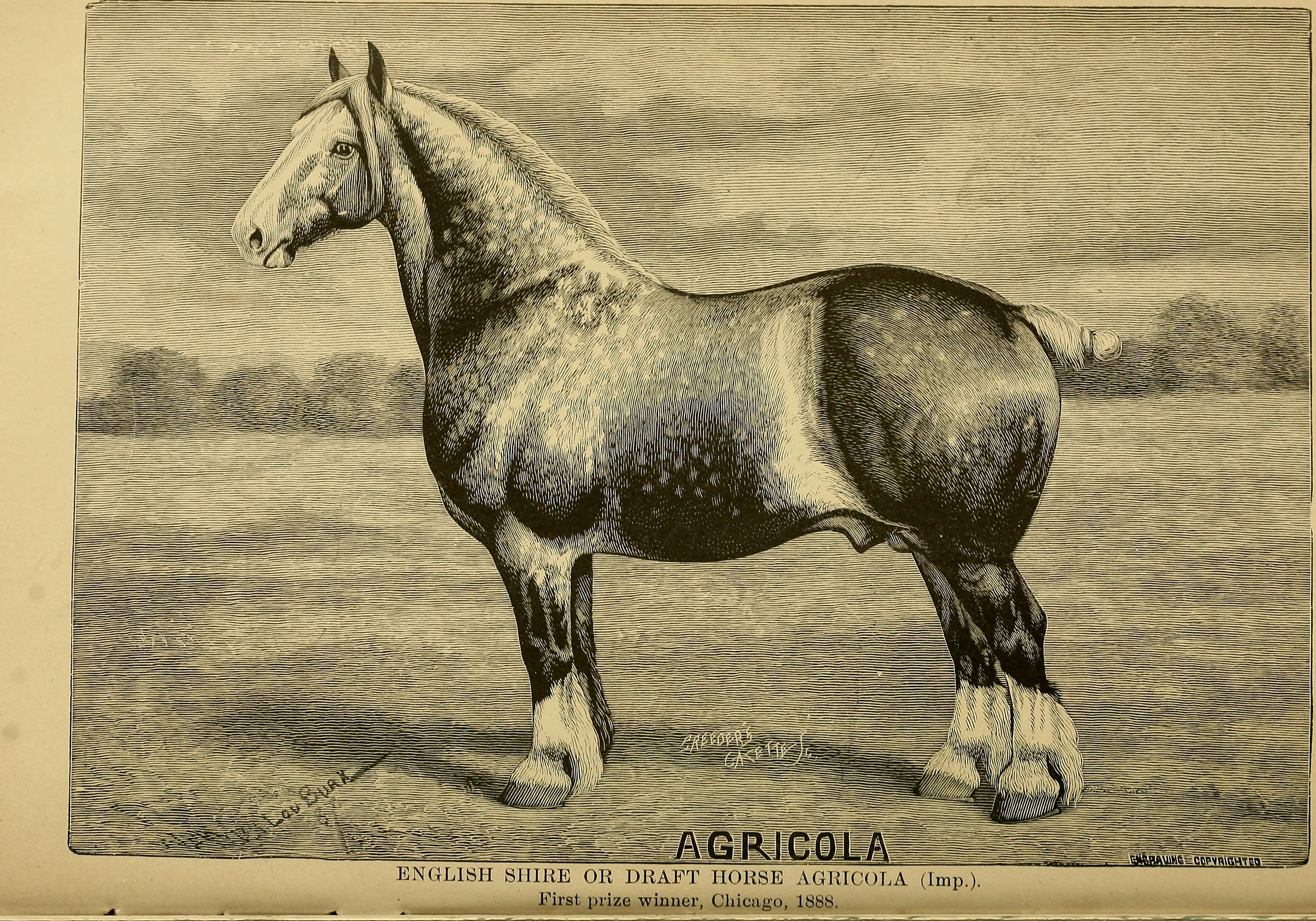
Shire, 1888

Though oxen were used for most farm work into the eighteenth century, horses "fit for the dray, the plough, or the chariot" were on sale at Smithfield Market in London as early as 1145.

The English Great Horse was valued during the reign of Henry VIII, when stallions measuring less than "fifteen handfuls" were not allowed, but the increasing role of gunpowder brought an end to the use of heavy horses in battle. Oliver Cromwell's cavalry favoured lighter, faster mounts and the big horses began to be used for draught work instead. During the sixteenth century, Dutch engineers brought Friesian horses with them when they came to England to drain the fens, and these horses may have had an influence on what became the Shire breed.

From this medieval horse came an animal called the Old English Black Horse in the seventeenth century. The horse was improved by Robert Bakewell of Leicestershire, resulting in a horse sometimes known as the "Bakewell Black" or "Lincolnshire Black". Bakewell imported six Dutch or Flanders mares, notable since breeders tended to concentrate on improving the male line. Two different types of horses developed: the Lincolnshire fens type formerly mentioned, and the Leicester or Midlands type. The Fen type tended to be larger, with more bone and hair, while the Midlands type tended to have more endurance while being of a finer appearance.

The term "Shire horse" was first used in the mid-seventeenth century, and incomplete records begin to appear near the end of the eighteenth century. The "Packington Blind Horse", from Leicestershire, is one of the best-known horses of the era, with direct descendants being recorded from 1770 to 1832. This horse is usually recognised as the foundation stallion for the Shire breed, and he stood at stud from 1755 to 1770. During the nineteenth century, Shires were used extensively as cart horses to move goods from the docks through the cities and countryside. The rough roads created a need for massive horses with great strength.

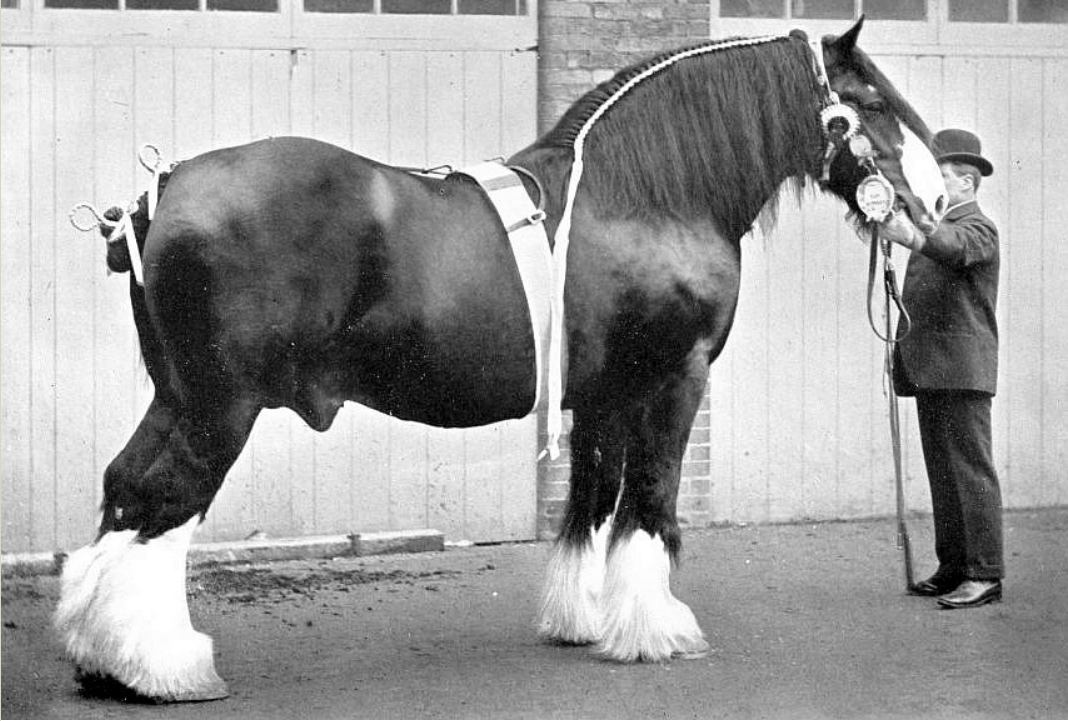
A Shire stallion, 1906

In 1878, the English Cart Horse Society was formed, and in 1884 changed its name to the Shire Horse Society. The Society published a stud book, with the first edition in 1878 containing 2,381 stallions and records dating back to 1770. Between 1901 and 1914, 5,000 Shires were registered each year with the society.

The first Shires were imported to the United States in 1853, with large numbers of horses being imported in the 1880s. The American Shire Horse Association was established in 1885 to register and promote the breed. The Shire soon became popular in the United States, and almost 4,000 Shires were imported between 1900 and 1918. Approximately 6,700 Shires were registered with the US association between 1909 and 1911.

Around the time of the Second World War, increasing mechanisation and strict regulations on the purchase of livestock feed reduced the need for and ability to keep draught horses. Thousands of Shires were slaughtered and several large breeding studs closed. The breed fell to its lowest point in the 1950s and 1960s, and in 1955 fewer than 100 horses were shown at the annual British Spring Show.

In the 1970s, the breed began to be revived through increased public interest. Breed societies have been established in the United States, Canada, the Netherlands, France, and Germany, and in 1996 the first World Shire Horse Congress was held in Peterborough. The first use within the breed of artificial insemination through frozen semen was with several Australian mares in 1997.

Between the 1920s and 1930s and today, the Shire has changed in conformation. The Clydesdale was used for cross-breeding in the 1950s and 1960s, which changed the conformation of the Shire and most notably changed the feathering on the lower legs from a mass of coarse hair into the silky feathering associated with modern Shires.

At the peak of their population, Shires numbered over a million. In the 1950s and 1960s, this number declined to a few thousand. In the United States, the Shire population dropped significantly in the early part of the twentieth century, and continued to decline in the 1940s and 1950s. Between 1950 and 1959, only 25 horses were registered in the United States. However, numbers began to increase, and 121 horses were registered in the US by 1985.

The National Shire Horse Spring Show is held annually and is the largest Shire show in Great Britain.

The conservation status of the Shire is listed by the Rare Breeds Survival Trust as "at risk", meaning that population numbers are estimated to be under 1500 head. In the United States, the Livestock Conservancy lists it as "critical", while the Equus Survival Trust calls it "vulnerable".

== Uses ==
The Shire horse was originally the staple breed used to draw brewer's drays. A few breweries still maintain this tradition in the UK, among them the Wadworth Brewery in Devizes, Wiltshire, the Hook Norton Brewery, the Samuel Smith Old Brewery in Tadcaster, Robinsons Brewery and Thwaites Brewery, which made Shire-drawn deliveries from the early 1800s to the 1920s, then resumed service in 1960. Several breweries have withdrawn their Shire horse teams, including the Tetley brewery in Leeds.

The horses are also used for forestry work and leisure riding.

Modern uses of Shire horses

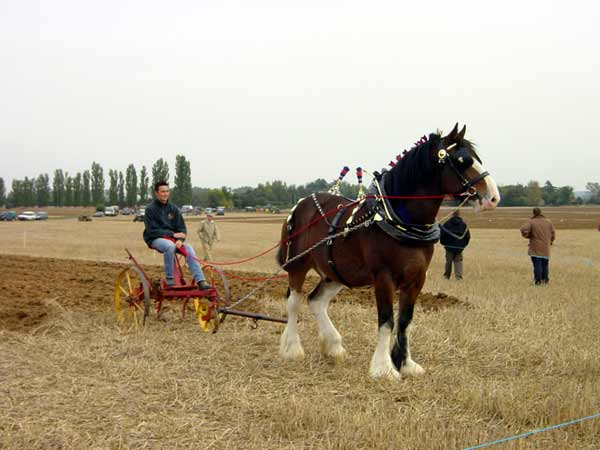
Ploughing

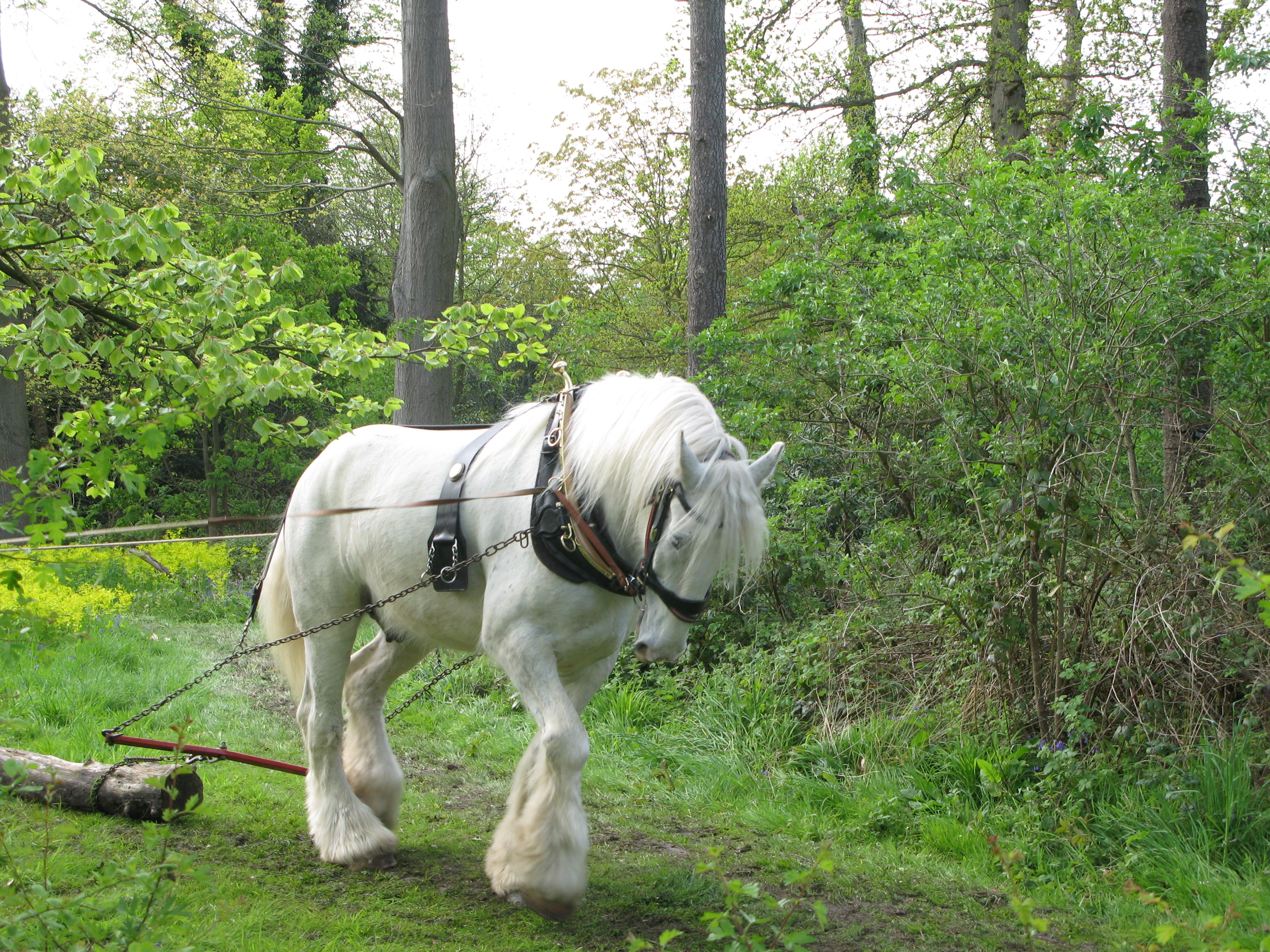
Logging

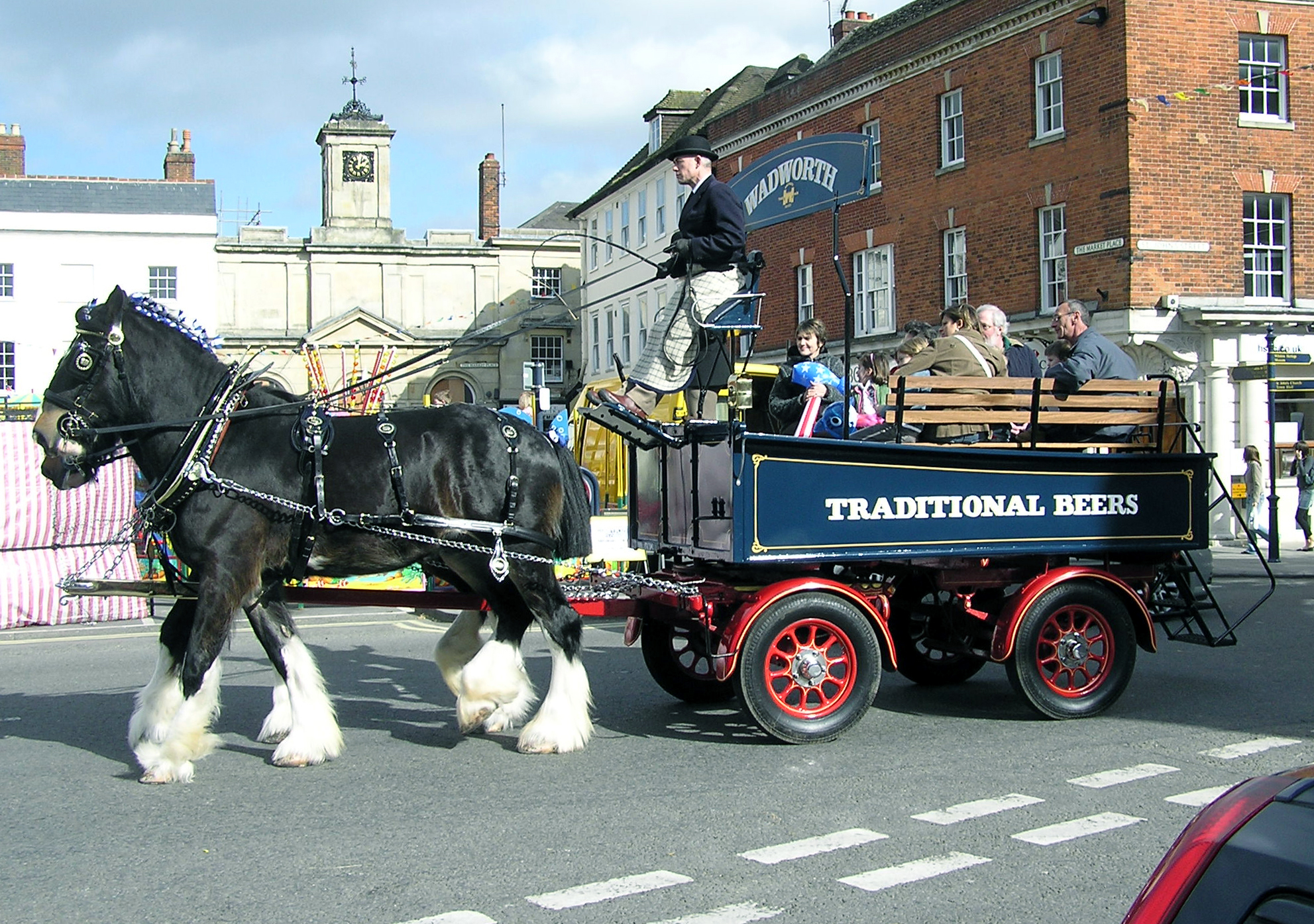
Tourist dray

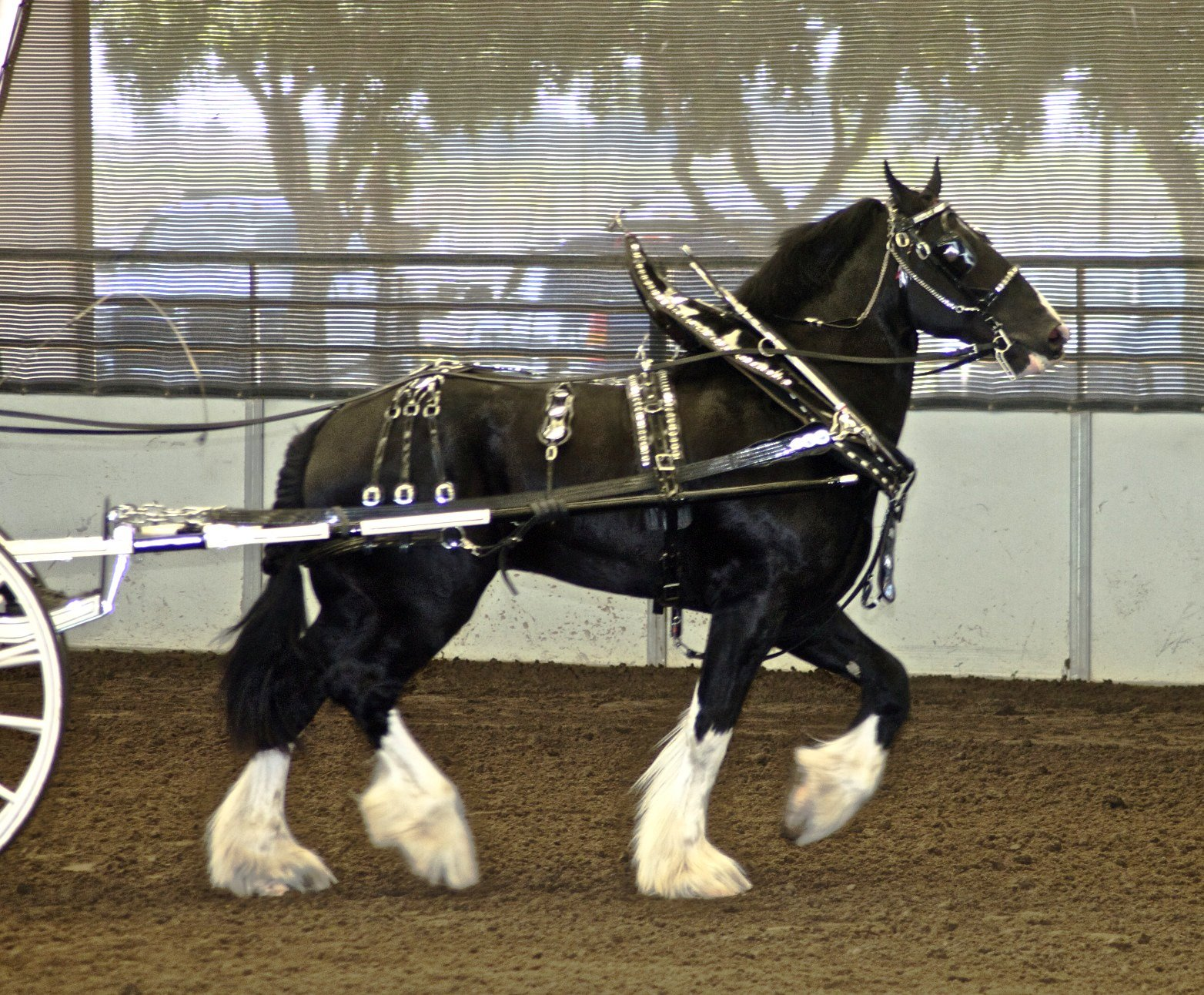
Showing, US

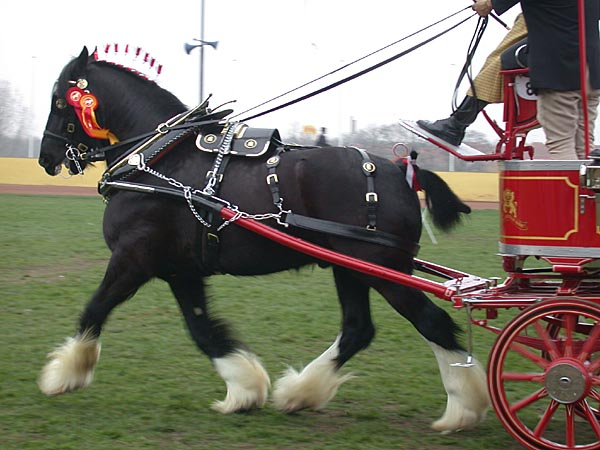
Showing, UK
