= Exmoor pony =

British breed of horse

Exmoor Pony
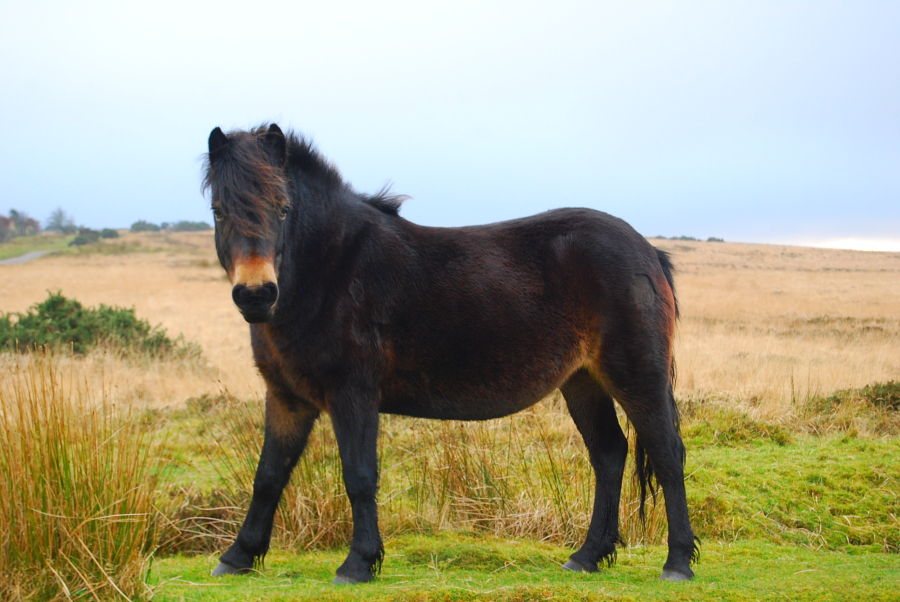

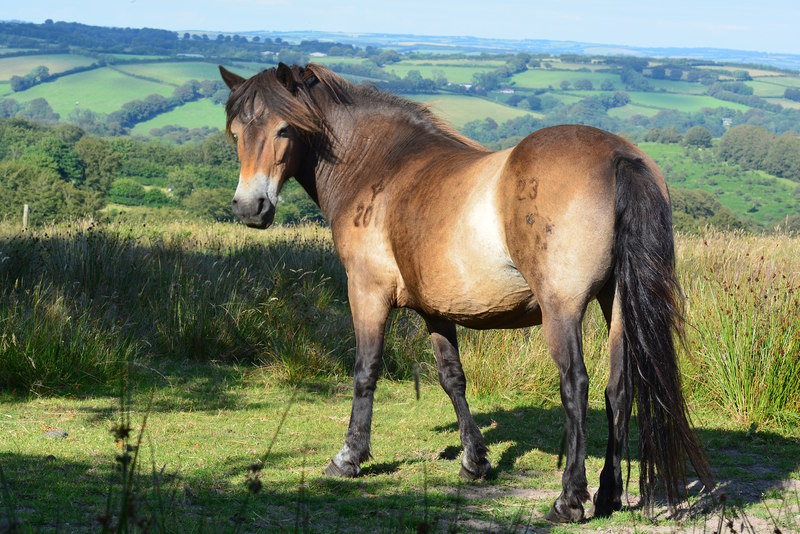
- Conservation status: priority, critical
- Country of origin: United Kingdom
- Standard: Exmoor Pony Society

Traits
- Height: Male: to 130 cm (12.3 h); Female: to 127 cm (12.2 h)
- Colour: brown with mealy markings

The Exmoor Pony is a British breed of pony or small horse. It is one of the mountain and moorland pony breeds native to the British Isles, and so falls within the larger Celtic group of European ponies. It originates on, and is named after, the Exmoor area of moorland in north-eastern Devon and western Somerset, in south-west England, and is well adapted to the climate conditions and poor grazing of the moor. Some still live there in a near-feral state but most are in private ownership.

Written records of ponies on Exmoor start with Domesday Book in 1086. After centuries of being a Royal Forest (not an area of trees but a hunting ground), most of Exmoor was sold in 1818. Thirty ponies, identified as the original old type, were moved to neighbouring moorland and were the foundation stock of the present-day breed. A breed society, the Exmoor Pony Society, was formed in 1921 and the first stud-book was published in 1963.

The ponies came close to extinction during the Second World War when some were stolen for food. After the war a small group of breeders worked to preserve the remaining stock. During the 1950s small numbers were exported to continental Europe and to Canada. In 1981 the vulnerability of the breeding population received publicity and numbers recovered somewhat.

In the 21st century it is a gravely endangered breed, with a total of 95 head reported in the United Kingdom in 2021, and an estimated population world-wide of 330. Its conservation status is listed by the Rare Breeds Survival Trust as priority, the highest level of concern of the trust. Inbreeding has also become an issue for the breed, and a 2013 study found that the Exmoor pony had one of the highest inbreeding coefficients of all horse breeds.

== History ==
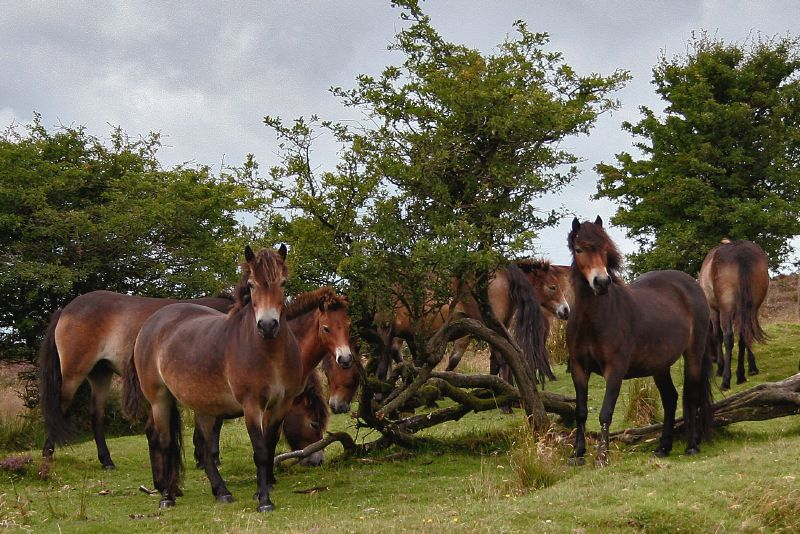
Group near Winsford

Ponies were first recorded in the Exmoor area in Domesday Book in 1086, but no count of the ponies roaming the Royal Forest of Exmoor is included since, being owned by the King, they were not to be taxed. Over the centuries a series of Wardens managed the Royal Forest, charging fees for the grazing of livestock including ponies. The change of Warden was often accompanied by the sale of ponies they personally owned, as for example in 1748 at the end of the Hill and Darch wardenship. Whether some were sold to incoming Wardens is not recorded. In 1767 Warden Sir Thomas Acland was grazing ponies on the Forest. Sales records from 1805 and 1809 list the colours black, grey, bay, dun, chestnut and piebald for ponies and 19th-century drawings show a variety of white markings in the breed. Studies disagree about the significance of this: some argue it shows that the native type of Exmoor pony was not limited to bay, brown and dun with mealy muzzles and that other coat colours were deliberately bred out to create a specific look that fitted a romantic idea of the native breed; others consider that because only the Warden could run stallions, cross-bred mares of different colours could coexist with the indigenous type.

In 1818 the Royal Forest and some adjoining land were sold to John Knight. Sir Thomas Acland, the outgoing warden, took thirty of "the old type" to Ashway Side close to Winsford Hill, whilst others were sold to local farmers. Records show that Acland then adopted two breeding strategies: a closed, purebred herd on Ashway Side and some separate crossing experiments on Winsford Hill. In contrast, John Knight, starting in 1826, crossed all the ponies he had purchased with Arabians, Thoroughbreds and other breeds to increase their size. Significantly, today's registered Exmoor pony population is descended from the Acland herd.

From the late nineteenth century Exmoors were selectively bred for the characteristic mealy muzzle. In 1921 the fledgling Exmoor Pony Society's rules accepted grey and black ponies in addition to bay, brown and dun, though the colour standards were soon tightened to exclude animals that did not conform to the carefully defined breed standard. In Herd 23 there are also chestnut pangaré and true dun individuals known, though the chestnut individuals are at this point not accepted in the registry. Exmoor pony registrations (as well as any ponies from Exmoor) were recorded in the Polo & Riding Pony Stud Books (the National Pony Society Stud Books from 1913). The Exmoor Pony Society published its first stud book exclusively for registered Exmoor ponies in 1963.

The Second World War led to a sharp decrease in the breed population. This was largely due to ponies being stolen for the wartime horse-meat market and a small number of ponies were supposedly also used for target practice by soldiers, Exmoor being a training ground.

After the war a small group of breeders, including Mary Etherington, worked to restore the herds. In the 1950s they were first exported to Canada and continental Europe, where small populations are still maintained. Since the mid-1980s small free-living herds of Exmoor ponies have been established in various areas of the UK and are used to manage vegetation on nature reserves belonging to organisations such as the National Trust, Natural England, and County Wildlife Trusts. Since the start of the 21st century Exmoor ponies have been in demand for rewilding projects both in the UK and in other European countries.

In 2000 the Moorland Mousie Trust, a British organisation, was established to assist in the preservation of the Exmoor pony. With very limited demand for Exmoor colts, the organisation works to raise funds for the gelding, handling and training of these ponies. In 2006 the Trust opened the Exmoor Pony Centre on Exmoor.

Until 2009 every purebred registered Exmoor was hot branded for individual identification. Then, with microchipping offering a viable alternative, in-ground (not moorland herds) breeders ceased to brand. A few years later hot branding became illegal throughout Britain for all except semi-feral ponies, for which there is no other workable alternative.

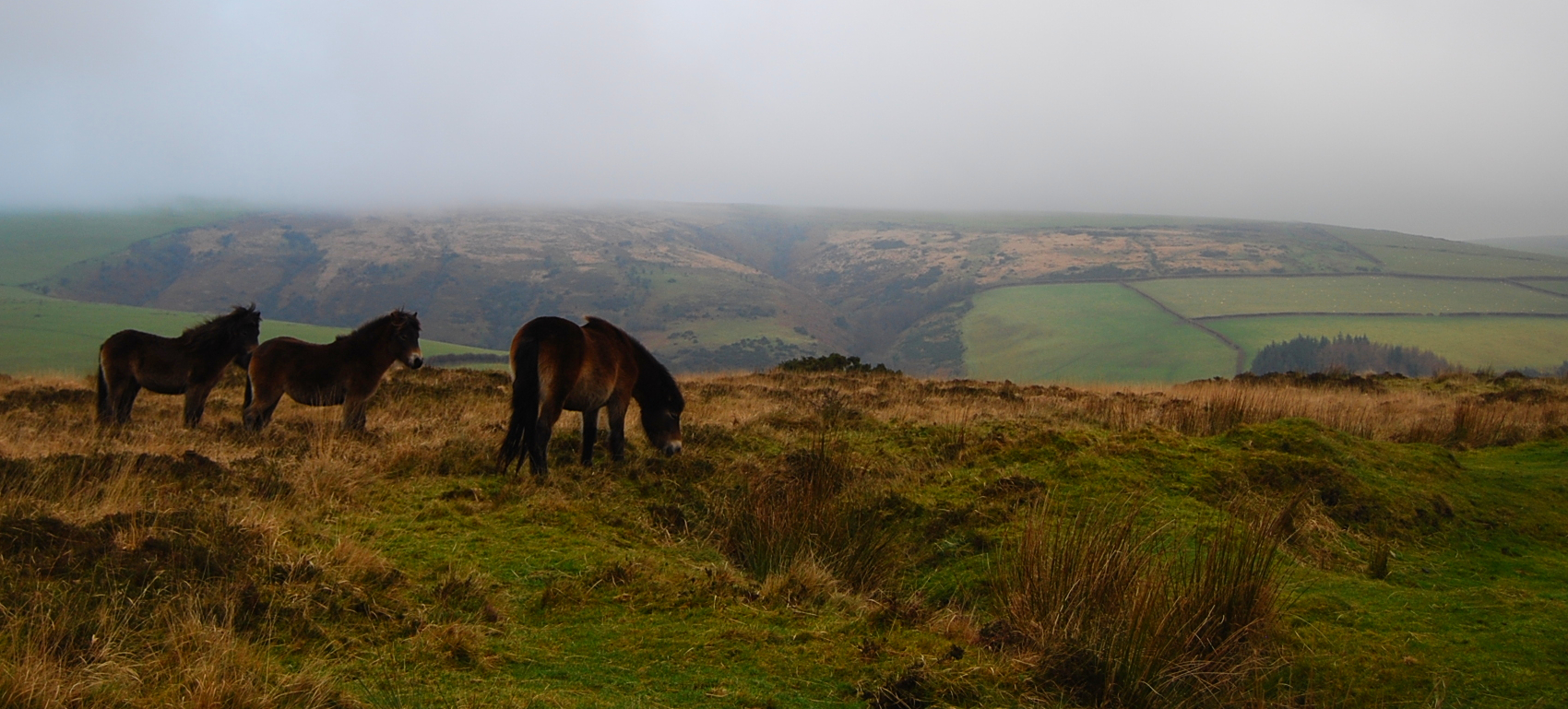
Exmoor ponies in their native habitat

Currently the UK Rare Breeds Survival Trust watchlist includes the Exmoor breed in its most threatened category, Priority, based on the number of breeding animals and the level of inbreeding. Whilst worldwide the total population numbers around 4,000 (the vast majority within the UK), the Exmoor Pony Society estimates the number of breeding animals is only around 600. The Livestock Conservancy in North America considers the population of the Exmoor pony to be at critical levels.

=== Prehistoric origin theories ===
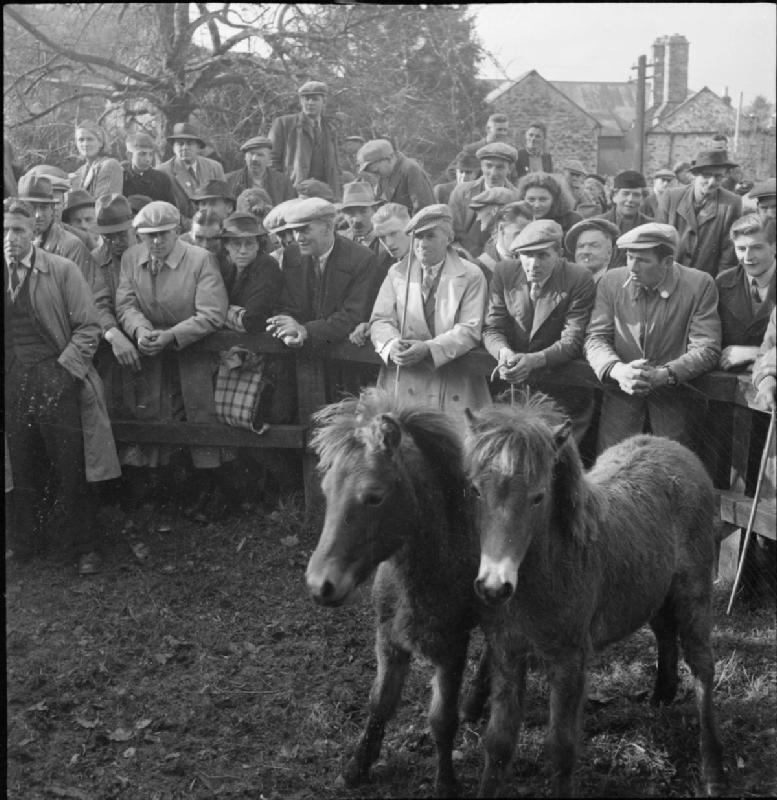
Bampton Fair in Bampton, Devon, October 1943

Some claim that the Exmoor pony descends direct from the wild horses of north-west Europe, uninfluenced by domesticated horses. Others consider that Exmoor ponies have a fully domesticated origin. Modern DNA research has not yet conclusively determined the breed's origins: studies indicate they share their maternally inherited mitochondrial DNA with various other horse breeds from across the world, and their paternally inherited Y-chromosome is identical to that of most other domesticated horses.

Wild horses have lived in Britain for hundreds of thousands of years. Some remains found date as early as 700,000 BC, whilst others are as recent as 3,500 BC. No genetic studies to date have correlated these prehistoric remains with any modern breed. What has been studied are Y-chromosomes (Y-DNA) and mitochondrial DNA (mtDNA). The Y-chromosome is passed on through the male line and worldwide shows very little genetic variation in horses, except for a second Y-chromosome haplotype found in China, suggesting that a very limited number of stallions contributed to the original genome of the domestic horse. The Exmoor pony shares this general Y-chromosome haplotype. Mitochondrial DNA is passed on though the female line and shows far more variation than Y-DNA, indicating that a large number of wild mares from several regions have contributed to modern domestic breeds. Genetically the Exmoor pony fits neatly in the Northwestern European cluster. Some mtDNA-haplotypes have been found in DNA samples obtained from wild horses in prehistoric deposits, whilst other mtDNA-haplotypes have been found only in domesticated horses, from both living individuals and archeological finds. The Exmoor pony has a high frequency of pre-domestication mtDNA-haplotypes; these are also found in some other breeds all around the world. Currently, for the British Isles, few DNA archeological samples have been studied.

Although wild horses were abundant after the last ice age, the lack of sufficient pre-domestication DNA samples makes it impossible to determine the contribution of the wild horses of the British Islands to modern breeds, including the Exmoor pony. A 1995 study of morphological characteristics, the outward appearance of organisms, indicated that the Exmoor, the Pottock and the now-extinct Tarpan have an extremely close resemblance. These breeds were consistently grouped together in the results from several analyses, with the Exmoor showing the closest relationship to the Tarpan of all the breeds studied, at 0.27, and the next-closest breeds to the Tarpan were the Pottock and Merens, both with a genetic distance from the Tarpan of 0.47. The distance between the Exmoor and Pottock was 0.37 and between the Exmoor and Merens was 0.40 - a significantly wider gap than the distance between the Exmoor and Tarpan.

The first indication of domesticated horses in England comes from archaeological investigations showing that the ancient Britons were using wheeled horse-drawn transport extensively in southwest England as early as 400 BC. Recent research has indicated that there was significant Roman involvement in mining on Exmoor. Metals including iron, tin and copper were transported to Hengistbury Head in neighbouring Dorset for export, and Roman carvings, showing British and Roman chariots pulled by ponies phenotypically similar to the Exmoor, have been found in Somerset.

== Characteristics ==
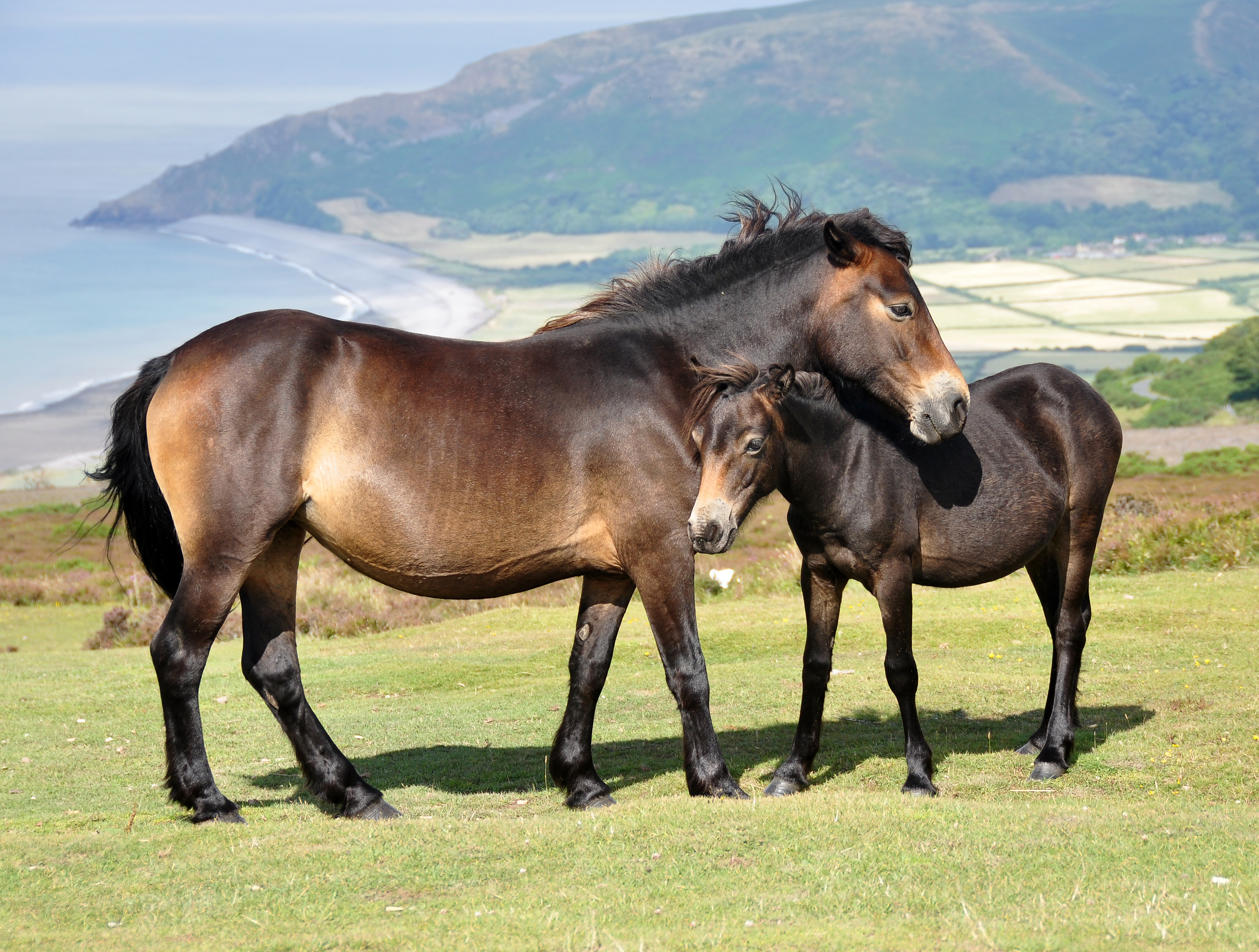
Mare and foal

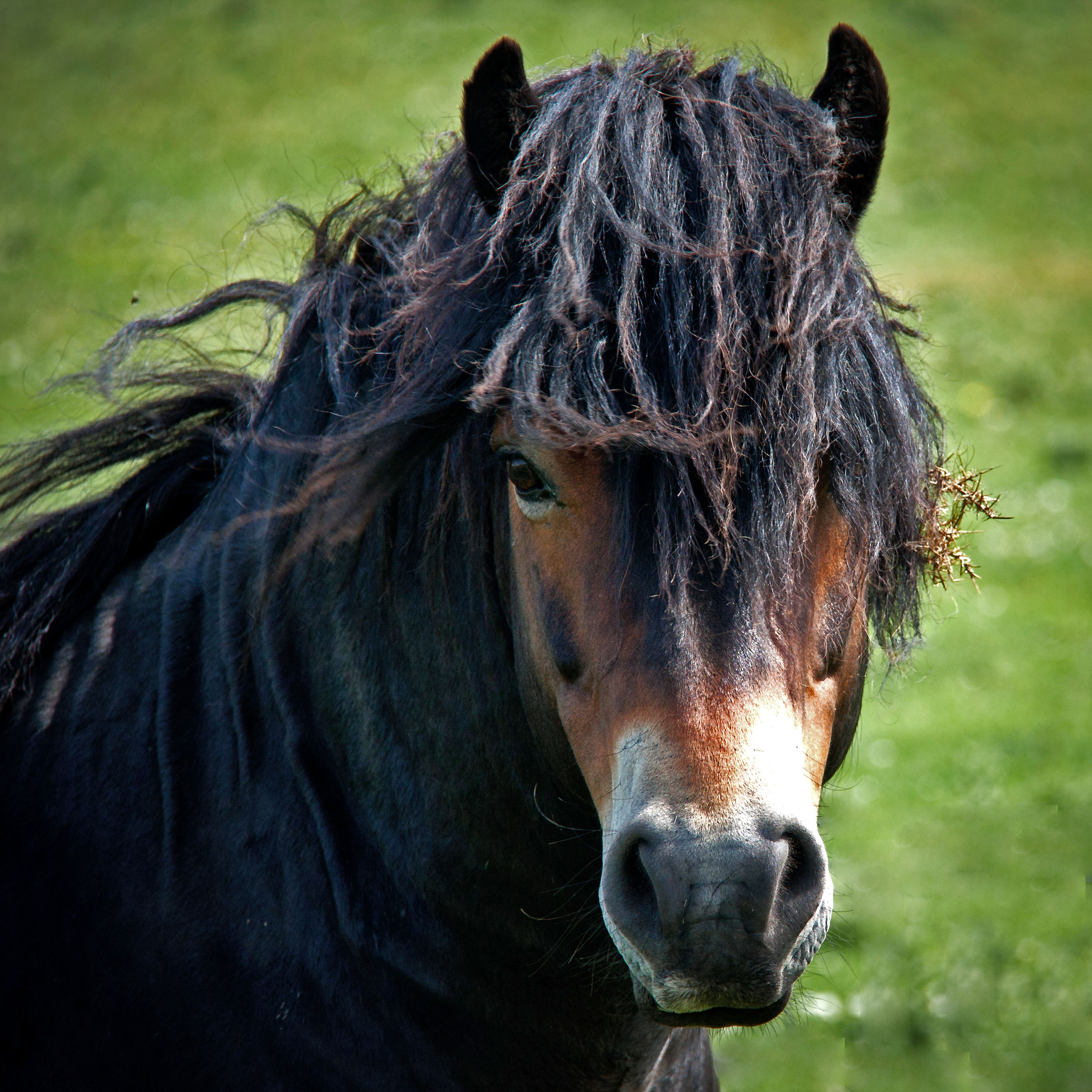
Thick mane

The Exmoor pony coat colour is predominantly a variant of dark bay, called "brown", with some individuals lighter and termed "bay". More rarely there exist dun Exmoors which the registry allows. All Exmoors display pangaré ("mealy") markings around the eyes, muzzle and underbelly. Pangaré markings occur in other equines as well as horses and are considered to be a primitive trait. In order to be registered in the stud book Exmoor ponies cannot have white markings. In height the majority of Exmoors range from 11.1 to 12.3 hands (45 to 51 inches, 114 to 130 cm) (45 to 51 inches, 114 to 130 cm), with the recommended height limit for mares being 12.2 hands (50 inches, 127 cm) (50 inches, 127 cm) and that for stallions and geldings 12.3 hands (51 inches, 130 cm). A few reach 13.2 hands

With a stocky, powerful build, the Exmoor pony is strong for its height and noted for its hardiness and endurance. The chest is deep and the back broad, the croup level. The legs are short, with good bone and hard hooves. Although many sources state that the Exmoor has a distinctly different jaw structure from other horse breeds, which includes the beginnings of development of a seventh molar, this is a misunderstanding based on an incorrect translation of a German study. The study refers to an extra branch of blood supply to the jaw and speculates that this might have been the early stages of evolving an extra molar. However the feature is found in a number of horse breeds with sizable lower jaws, so its presence in the Exmoor pony is unremarkable.

The head is somewhat large in proportion to the body, with small ears, and has a special adaptation called a toad eye (raised flesh above and below the eyes), which helps to deflect water and provide extra insulation. As with most cold-weather-adapted pony breeds, the Exmoor grows a winter coat consisting of a highly insulating woolly underlayer and a topcoat of longer, oily hairs that prevent the undercoat from becoming waterlogged by diverting water down the sides of the animal to fall from just a few drip areas. The mane and tail are thick and long and the dock of the tail has a fan of shorter, coarse hairs, called a 'snow chute' that deflects rainwater away from the groin and underbelly areas to fall from the long hairs on the back of the hind legs.

== Use ==
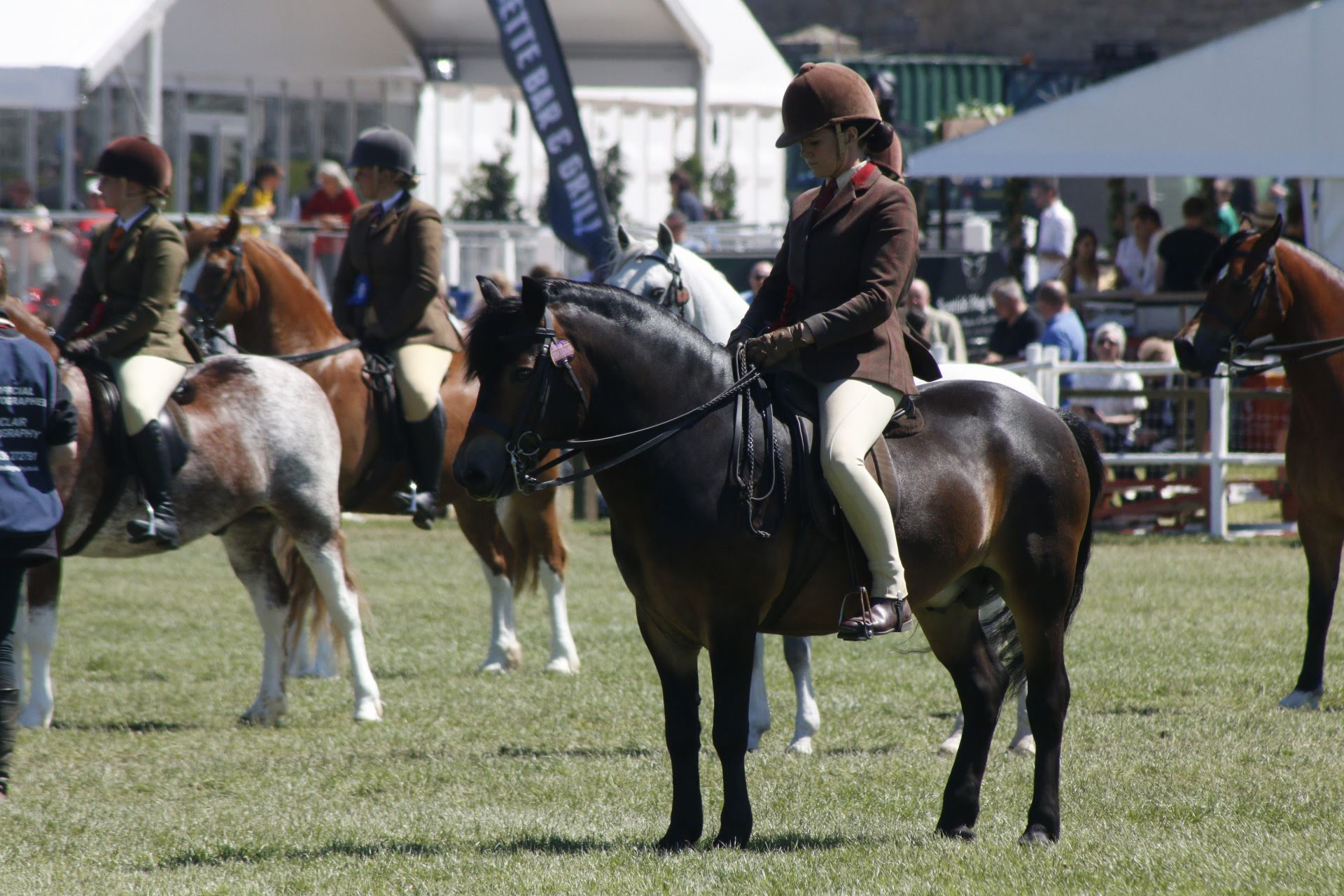
A stallion at the Royal Highland Show in 2018

Prior to the arrival of agricultural mechanisation, Exmoor ponies removed from the moorland herds, tamed and trained, were used primarily in hill farming. Tasks undertaken were ploughing/harrowing, shepherding and transport of feed. They were both ridden and driven, providing transport for Exmoor inhabitants. Some were sold away from the moor to work in harness elsewhere, possibly a small number as pit ponies.

Since these past roles ceased, surplus moorland-bred foals and ponies bred in-ground (on farms, studs etc.) have been used for a variety of leisure activities including showing, long-distance riding, driving, and agility. In 2003 Stowbrook Jenny Wren was the first Exmoor to win the NPS Bailey's Horse Feeds Ridden Mountain & Moorland Championship at the Olympia Christmas Show; Exmoor ponies won both divisions at the International Horse Agility Championships in 2011, and took a third title at the 2012 Championships. The breed's hardiness, dentition and varied diet makes it suitable for conservation grazing, and it contributes to the management of many heathland, chalk grassland and other natural pasture habitats as well as to the conservation of Exmoor itself.

In January 2015 fourteen Exmoor ponies from breeders within Exmoor National Park were exported to the Czech Republic's former military base of Milovice to improve biodiversity by conservation grazing. According to the annual count of 2019, this population has increased to 111 ponies.
