= Rearing (horse) =

Horse posture

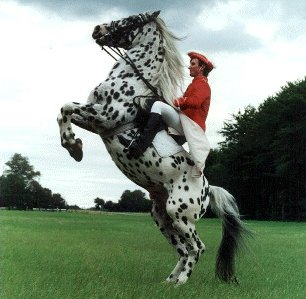
A horse trained to rear.

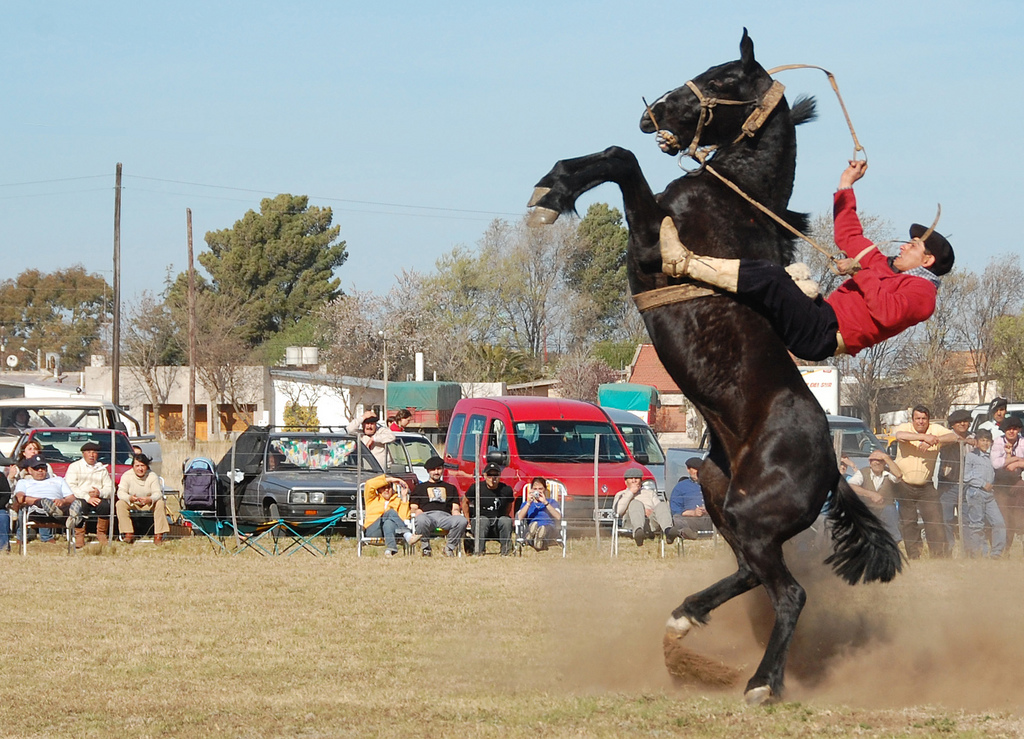
A horse (with rider) rearing out of control.

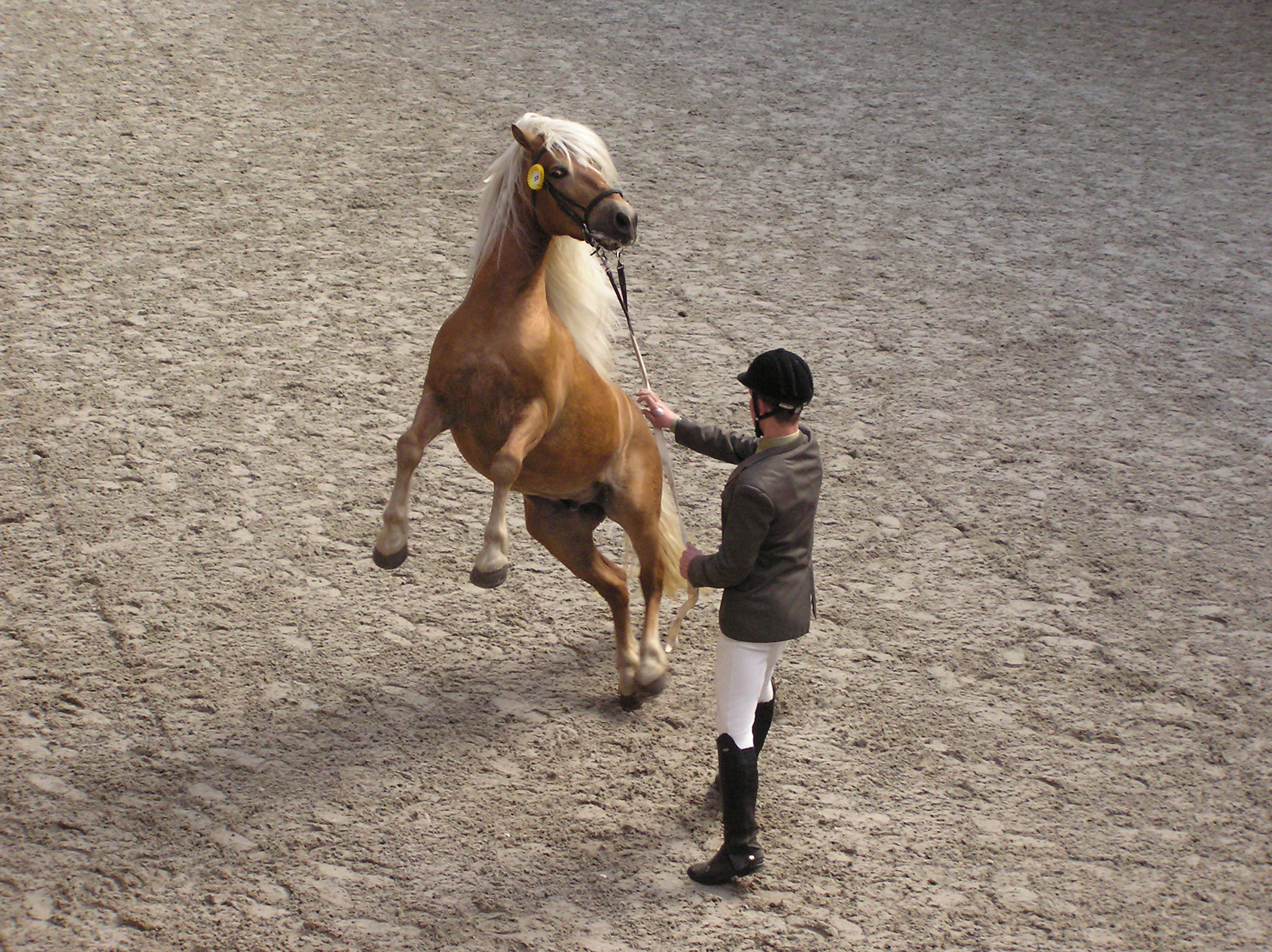
A rearing horse handled by a person on the ground.

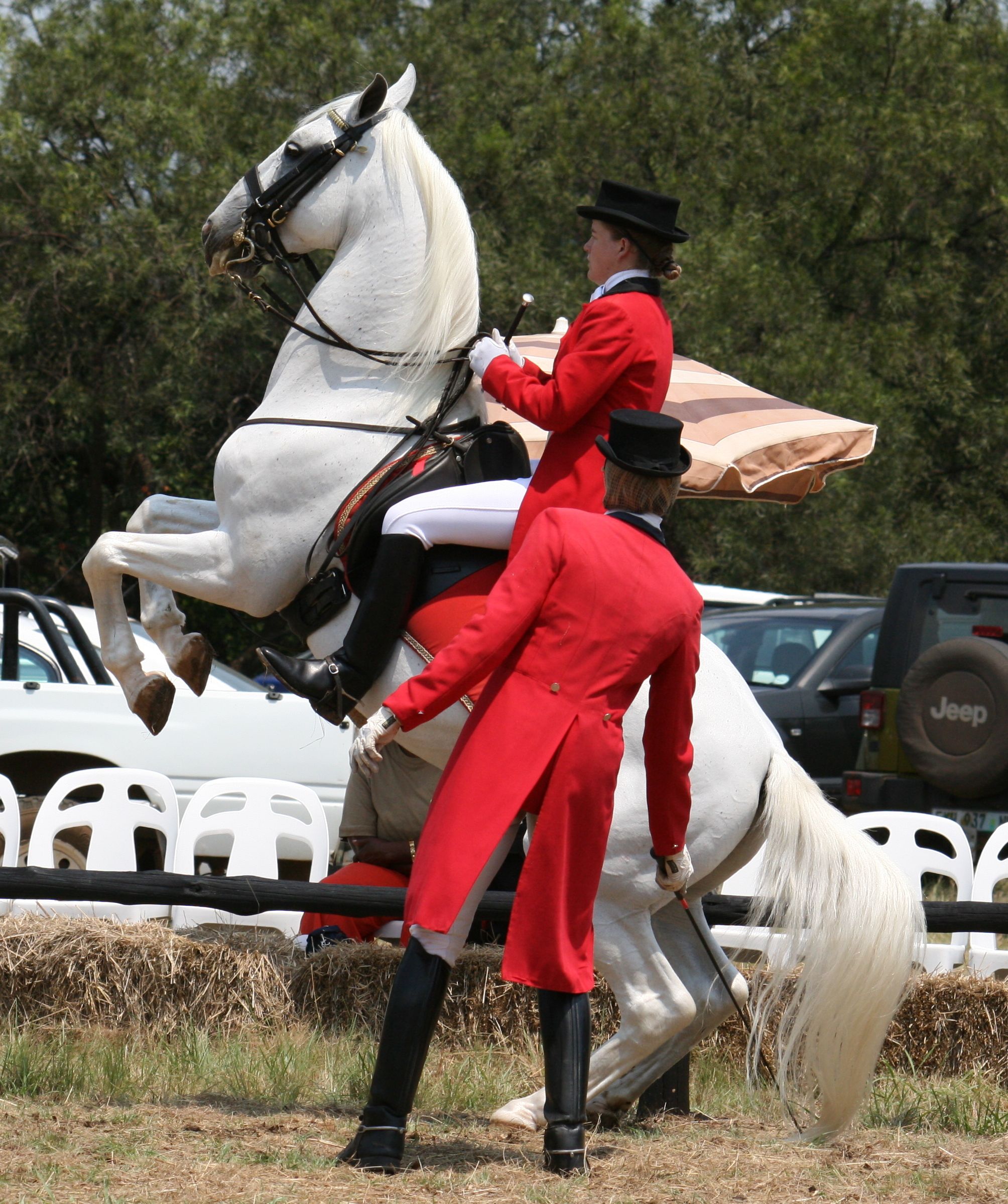
A highly trained horse performing the Pesade, a carefully controlled classical dressage movement where the horse raises its forehand off the ground for a brief period

Rearing occurs when a horse or other equine "stands up" on its hind legs with the forelegs off the ground. Rearing may be linked to fright, aggression, excitement, disobedience, non experienced rider, or pain. It is not uncommon to see stallions rearing in the wild when they fight, while striking at their opponent with their front legs. Mares are generally more likely to kick when acting in aggression, but may rear if they need to strike at a threat in front of them.

When a horse rears around people, in most cases, it is considered a dangerous habit for riding horses, as not only can a rider fall off from a considerable height, but also because it is possible for the animal to fall over backwards, which could cause injuries or death to both horse and rider. It is therefore strongly discouraged. A horse that has a habit of rearing generally requires extensive retraining by an experienced horse trainer, and if the habit cannot be corrected, the horse may be deemed too dangerous to ride.

A horse that rears when being handled by a human who is on the ground also presents a hazard, as it is able to strike out with its front feet and can also fall even without the weight of a rider to unbalance the animal. A rearing horse can also break away and escape from a human handler.

However, rearing also has survival value in the wild. It is a tactic that can be used to dislodge a predator that has landed on the animal's back, it is used when equids fight one another, and a horse can rear slightly to add force when striking out with its front feet. For these reasons, horses, particularly young ones, are sometimes seen rearing when loose in a pasture, particularly when playing or mock-fighting with pasturemates.

There are also a few times when rearing is considered acceptable by humans. Rearing may be taught as a trick for circus horses and the like. There are also two movements in classical dressage, the Levade and the Pesade, in which the rider asks the horse to set well back on its hindquarters and raise its front legs off of the ground to varying degrees. However, horses properly trained to do any of these movements are taught to respond to very specific commands and raise their forequarters only when given the command.

== Dealing with the rearing horse ==
A horse generally must stop before it can rear. Generally a rider can feel if a horse is about to rear, as the horse shifts its weight strongly to its hindquarters and begins to feel "light in the front end." When this occurs, rearing can still be prevented by a number of methods, the simplest of which is to either encourage the horse to move, either forward or to turn the horse in tight circles so that it cannot engage its hindquarters enough to rear. If the horse is allowed to stop or back up while behaving in a disobedient manner, it can more easily rear.

When a horse manages to rear while under saddle, the rider has the best chance of bringing the horse back to the ground by leaning forward, keeping the reins slack and, in some cases, reaching around the neck of the horse to distribute as much weight as possible to the forehand. Once on the ground, the rider can prevent further rearing by asking the horse to move, either forward or in circles.

== Causes and solutions ==
Rearing can be caused by fear; a horse that sees something alarming in front of it may stop and, if asked to continue forward, may rear rather than move ahead. Another fear response may come from poor riding. A rider that is particularly hard on a horse's mouth with the reins and bit may provoke a horse to rear from the pain the horse feels in its mouth. A horse may rear out of confusion because it does not understand what the rider's commands, or riding aids mean, or because the rider is giving harsh or conflicting commands. If a rider both holds onto the horse's mouth at the same time they push the horse strongly with their legs, essentially using the "gas and the brake" at the same time, they can also provoke rearing.

In fact, trained, controlled movements such as the levade and the pesade are deliberately requested by a sophisticated form of collection where a careful, highly balanced rider asks the horse to raise its forequarters by a combination of riding aids that simultaneously gather the horse onto its hindquarters and lighten it in front.

If rearing with a rider is not clearly linked to fear, disobedience or aggression, it may be linked to pain. An equine veterinarian can examine the horse's mouth and teeth, back, and feet for possible causes. Pain may also be linked to poorly fitted or improperly used tack. A rider or saddle-fitting specialist can determine if pain is linked to a poorly fitted saddle, or a broken saddle tree. The fit and severity of the bit can also lead to rearing.

Riders should also consider the management of the horse, especially if the animal does not have turn-out time and has too rich of a diet. A horse may rear due to excitement and excess energy.

For horses that rear while a person is leading them on the ground, the safest position for the handler is to be at the side of the animal so that the handler has maximum control but is still away from the front legs should the horse strike out. Leading horses with a stud chain on the halter or with a bridle offers more control if an animal rears; however, misuse of this equipment by jerking on the horse's head may also provoke rearing.

== In popular culture ==
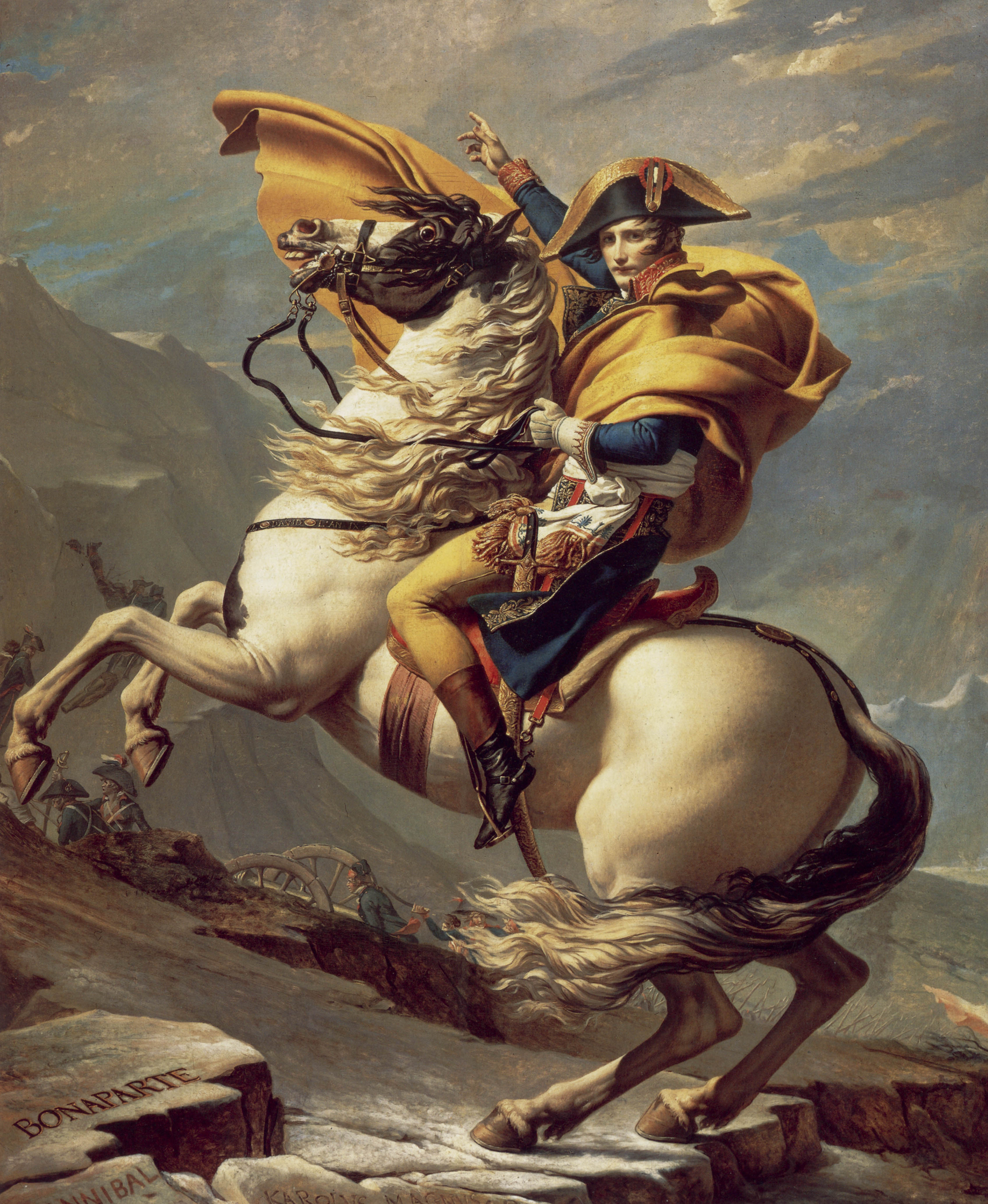
Napoleon Crossing the Alps

Rearing horses are often seen in movies and television, whether to signal urgency or if the character wants to look impressive. An example of this is The Lone Ranger, in which the white stallion, Silver, would rear up with the Lone Ranger on his back, then they would dash off, the Ranger encouragingly shouting, "Hi-Yo, Silver!"
