= Equine agility =

Equine agility or horse agility is a sport similar to dog agility but using horses. Horses are asked to navigate an obstacle course with guidance from a human handler on the ground. At lower levels, the horse may be guided with a lead rope but at higher levels the horse works without a lead and in some cases, without a halter. There also are competition levels where horses compete in the "wild" — outside of an enclosed arena, and competitions where horses are not judged live but rather via video sent in by their handlers. Any equine of any size may compete in agility, including miniature horses, donkeys, mules and draft horses.

In live competition, handlers are required to wear an equestrian helmet and cannot use whips or sticks. The horse is only allowed, at most, to wear a halter, lead rope and may wear leg protection such as brushing boots. The lead rope must be loose and the handler cannot pull on it but must remain within a designated position with their horse. Competition usually consists of a course of eight or more obstacles. Examples of obstacles may include tunnels, jumps, a seesaw, passing through a curtain, weaving between poles or cones, passing through or over poles, branches, gates, hoops, water, or tarps; entering a trailer; rolling a ball, backing between two poles, stepping onto an object, standing still, carrying a light load, crossing a bridge, navigating a small maze or labyrinth, crossing over an A-frame, and so on. Courses are often timed, particularly at higher levels.

== See also ==
- Trail (horse show)
- Western riding (horse show)
- Show jumping
- Show hunter
- Combined driving
