= Ponying =

Horse riding practice

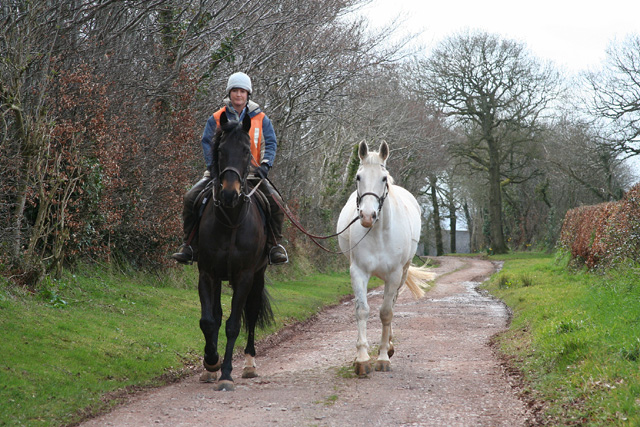
Ponying a horse

Ponying is the practice of leading one horse while riding another. Although the word "pony" is used, horses used for ponying are generally full-sized, rather than ponies.

Ponying can be used to exercise horses too young to be ridden, or to provide light work to injured horses or those recovering from illness or surgery. It is a useful method by which a single individual can condition more than one horse at a time, and multiple polo ponies are often exercised at the same time by a single rider. Horses can also be ponied with riders on both horses, a practice commonly seen at American racetracks, where the pony rider assists in controlling the race horse, usually a younger and more fractious horse. Strings of packhorses are often ponied from a rider atop the first horse in the string.

The pony horse must have a calm and steady disposition. Geldings are often preferred mounts due to their more reliable disposition, particularly for ponying stallions.

Sometimes ponying is done from a western saddle to give the pony rider more control over the led horse because it allows the rider to "dally" or wrap the lead rope around the saddle horn if needed to maintain control of the ponied horse.

== American racing ==
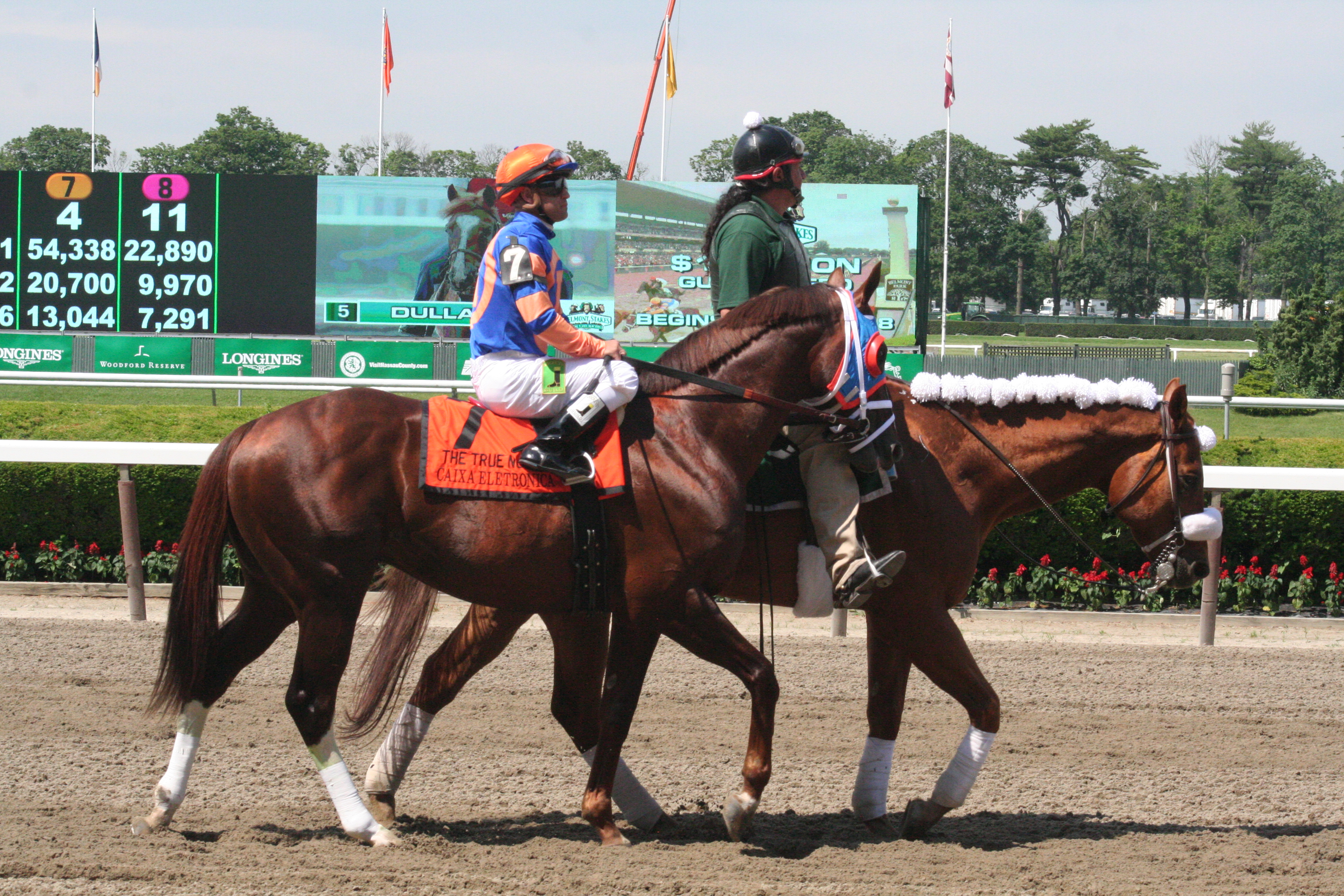
A race horse and jockey being ponied on the track prior to a race

At a race track, ponying is done to escort race horses to the track, to accompany them as they warm up, to assist at the starting gate, and to escort horses back at the end of a race. Some of the riders at race tracks, including harness racing tracks, are called "outriders" who are there to catch loose horses as well as to help slow down horses after a race and pony them back to the stands. Although ponying is almost universal in American horse racing, it is not common in European horse racing.
