= Lead (tack) =

Line used to lead a horse

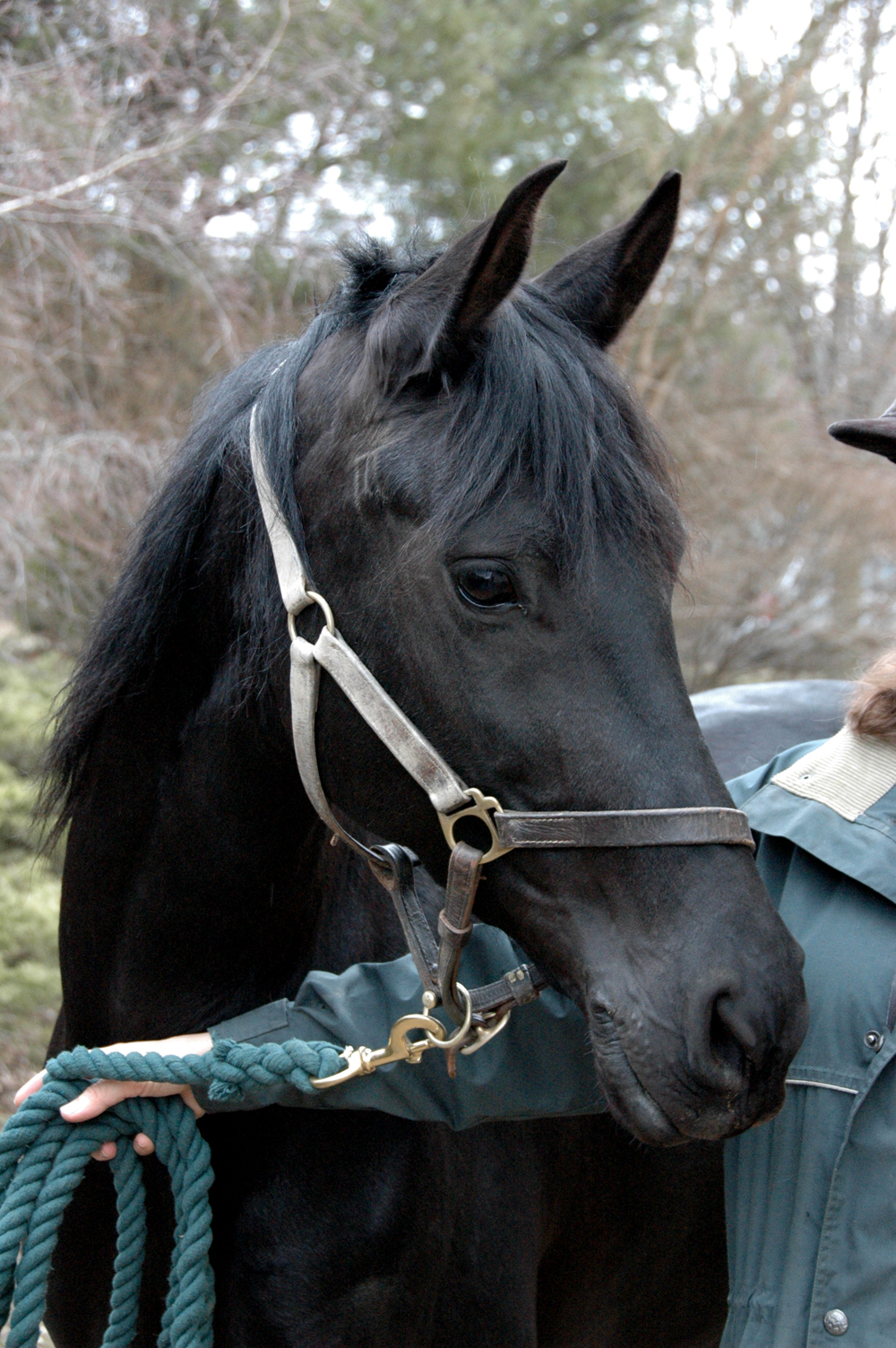
Lead clipped to a horse's halter

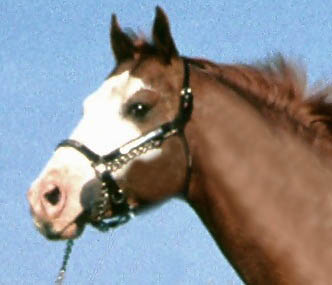
A lead shank applied under the chin

A lead, lead line or lead rope (US & UK) is used to lead an animal such as a horse. Usually, it is attached to a halter. The lead may be integral to the halter or, more often, separate. When separate, it is attached to the halter with a heavy clip or snap so that it can be added or removed as needed. A related term, lead shank or lead chain refers to a lead line with a chain attached that is used in a variety of ways to safely control possibly difficult or dangerous horses if they will not respond to a regular lead.

== Variations ==
A lead can be made from a variety of materials, including cotton, horsehair (woven or braided hair, usually from a horse's tail), leather, nylon or other synthetic materials. Lead ropes, as the name implies, are round and made of various types of rope, usually between 5/8 and 3/4 inch (about 2 cm) in diameter. Lead lines are usually flat webbing or leather, and are generally .75 to 1 inch (1.9 to 2.5 cm) wide, though may be narrower for show use. Flat lines are less bulky and more comfortable in the hand for leading and animal, but may lack adequate strength for tying.

A lead most often attaches to the halter with a sturdy snap. In some cases, the lead is tied or spliced permanently to the halter. A lead for a horse usually is in the range of 9 to 12 feet (2.7 to 3.7 m) long, but longer and shorter lengths are seen.

The lead shank consists of a lead, usually a flat line, with a chain end, or, less often, thin nylon or rope. The chain end ranges from 18 to 30 inches (46 to 76 cm) long and has a snap or clip on the end that attaches to the halter, and a ring on the other end that is attached to the lead line. Some lead lines are permanently sewn to the chain shank, others have buckles or clips allowing the chain to be removed. Lead shanks are usually used on potentially difficult or dangerous horses, such as stallions or those that, for various reasons, will not respond to a regular lead. For this reason, in some regions, lead shanks are sometimes called "stud chains." They are also commonly seen on in-hand horses of all ages and sexes at some horse shows, as the chain shank can also be used to transmit commands quickly but inobtrusively, encouraging a prompt response from the horse.

For aesthetic purposes, the lead may be the same color as the halter, and sometimes even made of the same materials.

== Use ==
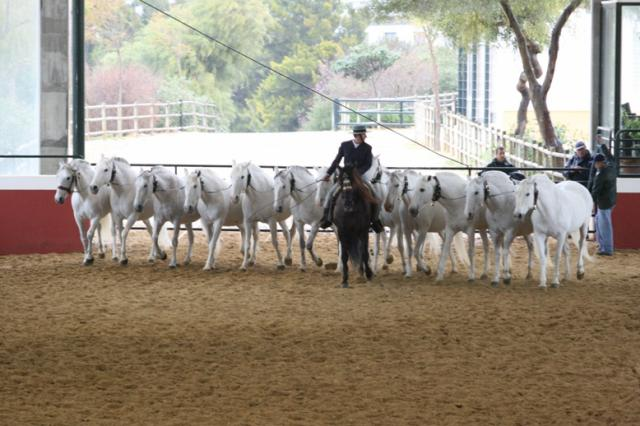
A group of horses being led together by a single handler

Leads are used to lead, hold, or tie an animal or string of animals. A horse may be led by a person on the ground, sometimes called "leading in-hand," or may be led by a rider mounted on another horse, a process called "ponying." A "string" of animals refers to animals tied to one another by their leads, whether the human leads the horses in hand or from another horse. Horses requiring physical conditioning, such as Polo ponies or roping horses, may be conditioned in strings. Pack horses are often led in strings on the trail, usually with the handler ponying the first pack horse and for the rest, the lead rope of one horse is tied to the tail or saddle of the horse in front of it.

== Safety in leading ==
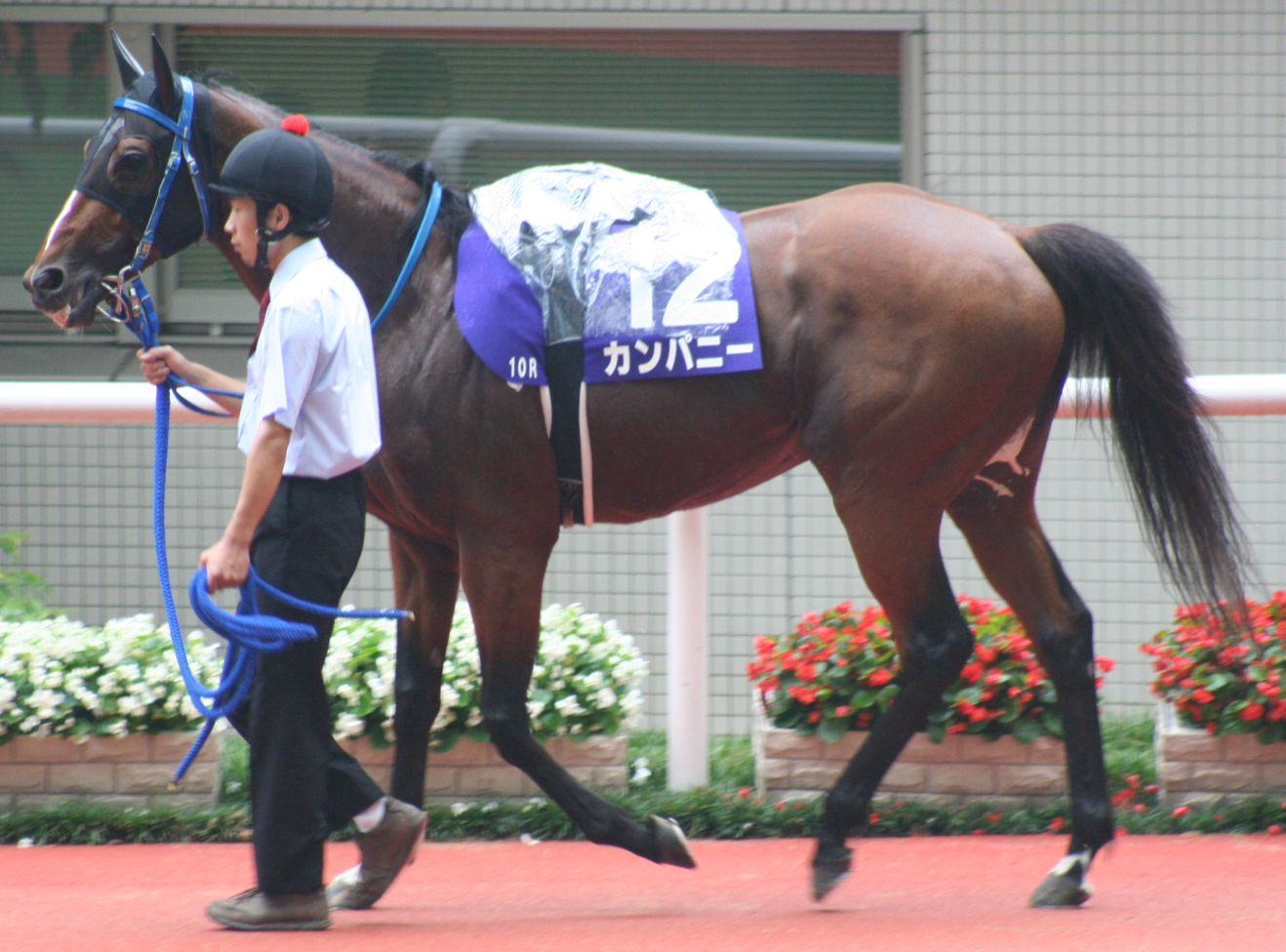
Horse led from the side, excess lead rope folded and held, not wrapped around the hand

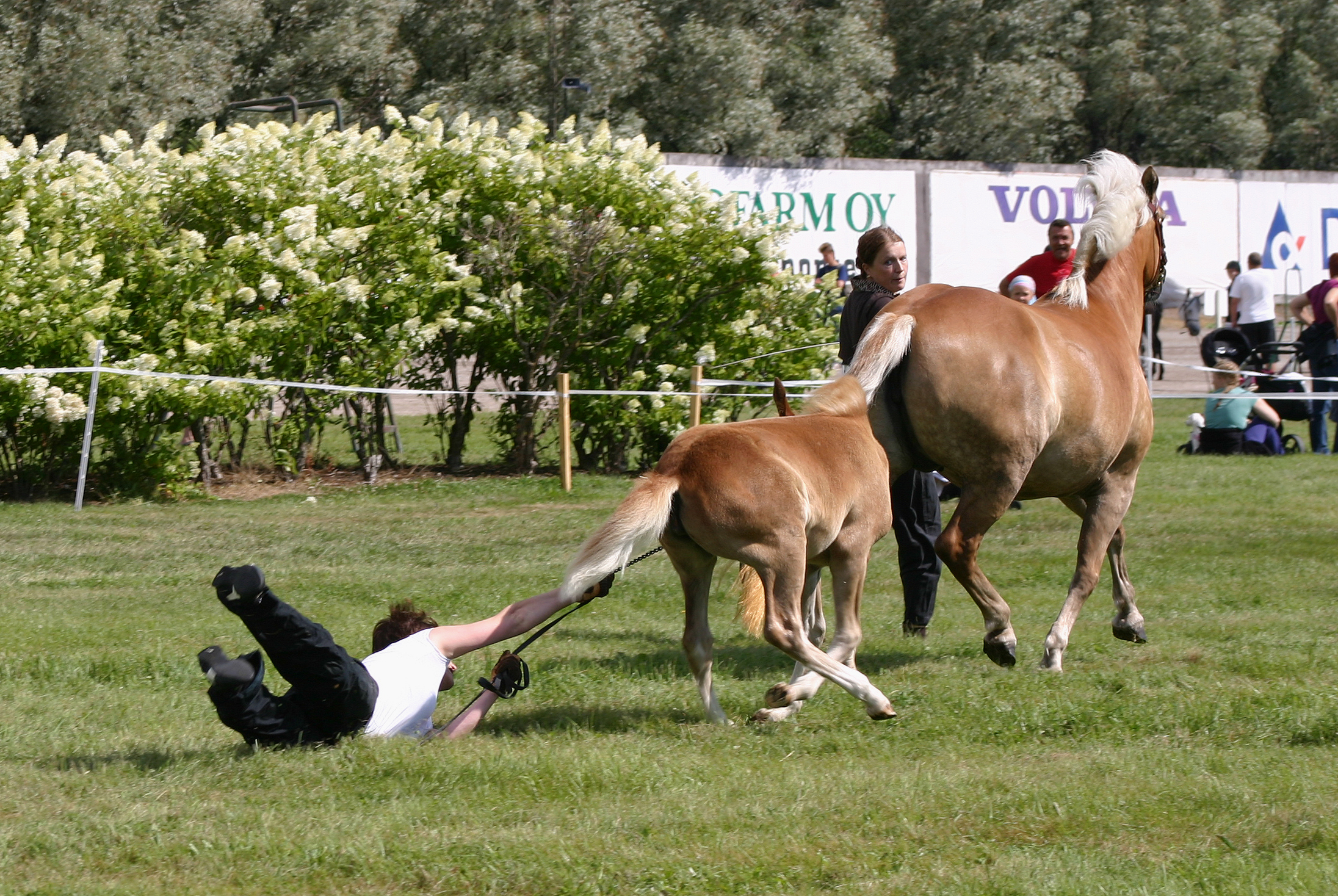
Wrapping the lead rope around the hand can have disastrous consequences

By tradition, the handler leads a horse from the horse's left ("near") side, though situations may arise when a horse needs to be led from the right ("off") side. In some areas, particularly in the American west, the handler may be in front of the horse while leading, though this technique does place the handler at risk due to not being able to see what the horse is doing.

When leading a horse, the handler usually holds a single thickness of the lead with the right hand, while carrying the gathered slack of the lead in the left. The excess line should be laid in back-and-forth loops that fall on either side of the hand; holding the excess in circular loops, wrapping, or coiling the lead around the hand is dangerous, the handler can be dragged, injured or even killed if the horse pulls away, tightening the loops of the lead around the hand.

When used to lead a horse in hand, the materials used in a lead, particularly synthetics, may put a handler at risk of a rope burn should the horse pull the lead from the handler. Some handlers wear gloves while leading a horse.

== Tying ==
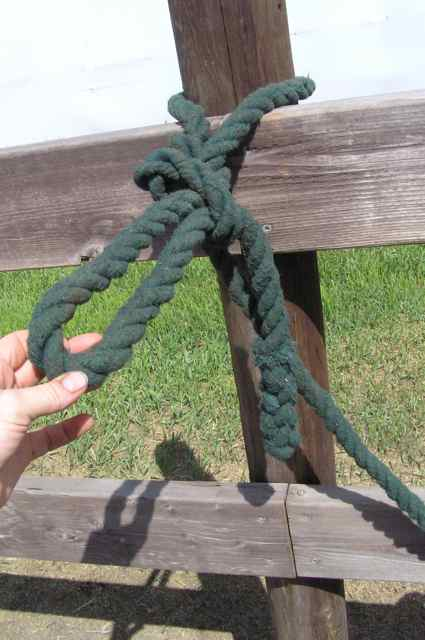
A lead rope tied to a fencepost with a safety knot known as a "figure 8" halter hitch

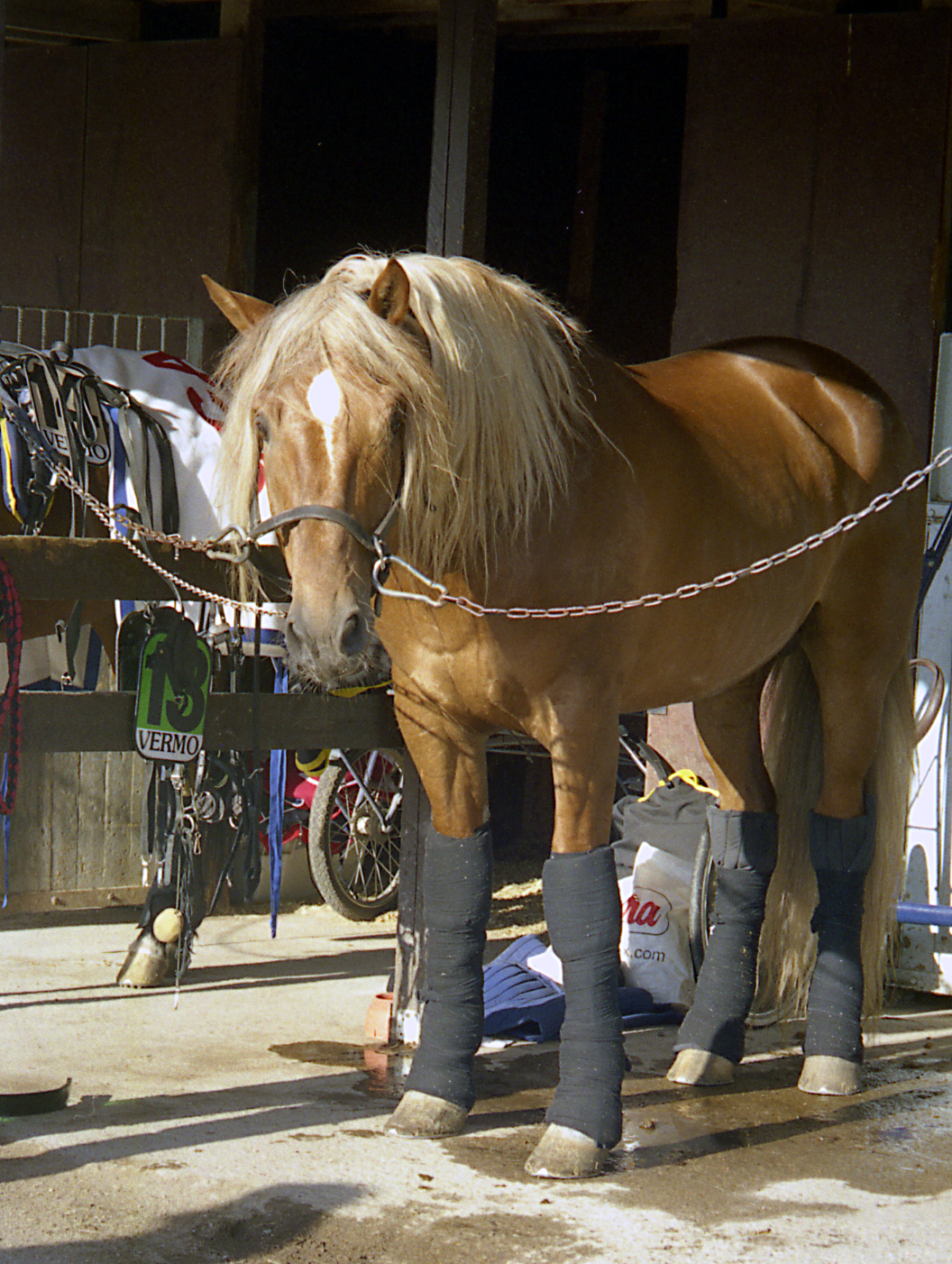
A horse in crossties. Either chain or rope are used to restrain the animal. Crossties are not used to lead the animal, only for restraint

Lead ropes may be used to tie up animals. Common methods of tying off a lead include the halter hitch and a subset of other loop knots, collectively known among equestrians as safety knots and quick release knots. If the animal begins to panic, a person can pull the working end to quickly release the knot before it becomes too tight to untie quickly. The purpose of such a knot is to be easy to untie even when under significant tension. However, some animals do learn to untie themselves and may require the loose end of the rope to be passed through the slipped loop to prevent this occurrence, or be tied with alternative methods of restraint.

Animals, usually horses, may also be placed in crossties, usually for grooming, tacking up and related activities. Crossties are commonly made from two lead ropes, each attached to a wall with the snap end placed on either side of the horse's halter. This technique of restraint keeps the horse from moving around as much as with a single lead, and is particularly handy when people are working on both sides of the animal. However, the method also presents some danger to the animal if it rears or falls. Ideally, crossties are attached at one end with either a quick release panic snap or breakaway mechanism.

Flat lead shanks and thin diameter ropes generally lack the strength to securely tie a large animal such as a horse or cow, but may be more comfortable in a person's hand for leading. Ropes of a thick diameter (3/4 in or more) and high tensile strength generally are adequate to tie a large animal that resists being tied; thinner and/or weaker leads generally will break if significant tension is put on them. A common point of failure is the snap fastener used to attach the lead to the halter.

An animal that panics and attempts to escape while tied with a lead can cause itself serious injury or damage the objects to which it is tied. When an animal is left unattended or if a safety knot is improperly tied and cannot be released, views differ as to whether a lead rope should be made strong enough not to break under tension, or if it should have safety elements that allow it to give way when tension reaches a certain point in order to minimize potential injury. Some people carry a very sharp knife in a belt holster or boot or keep a sharp knife in a convenient location in order to cut a lead in case of emergency. In other cases, particularly on leads used to restrain an animal in a horse trailer, a panic snap may be used, though releasing the snap while under extreme tension also may put a handler at some risk of injury.

== Use of a shank ==
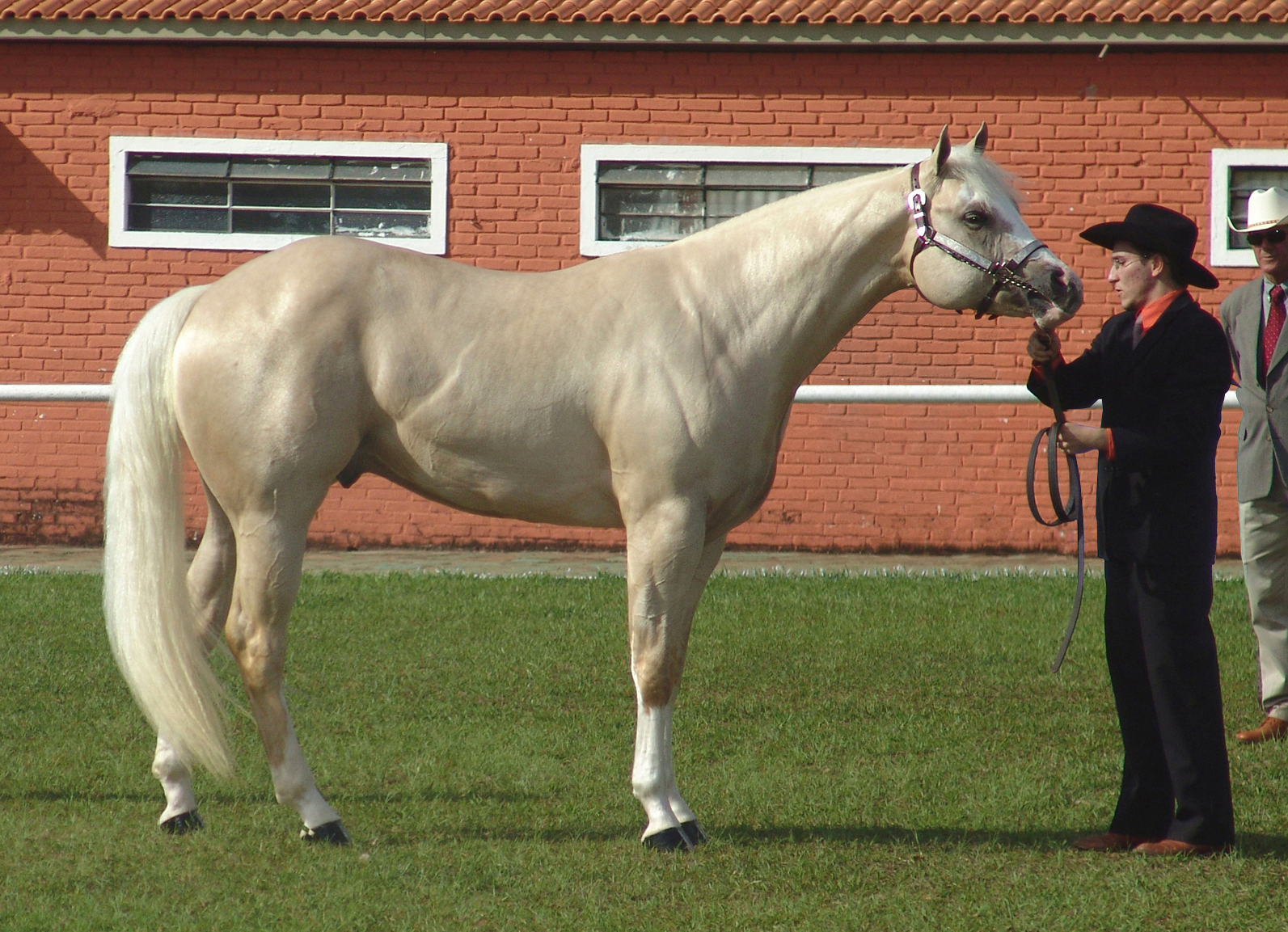
A lead shank applied through the mouth. Generally not permitted under the rules for horse shows in the United States.

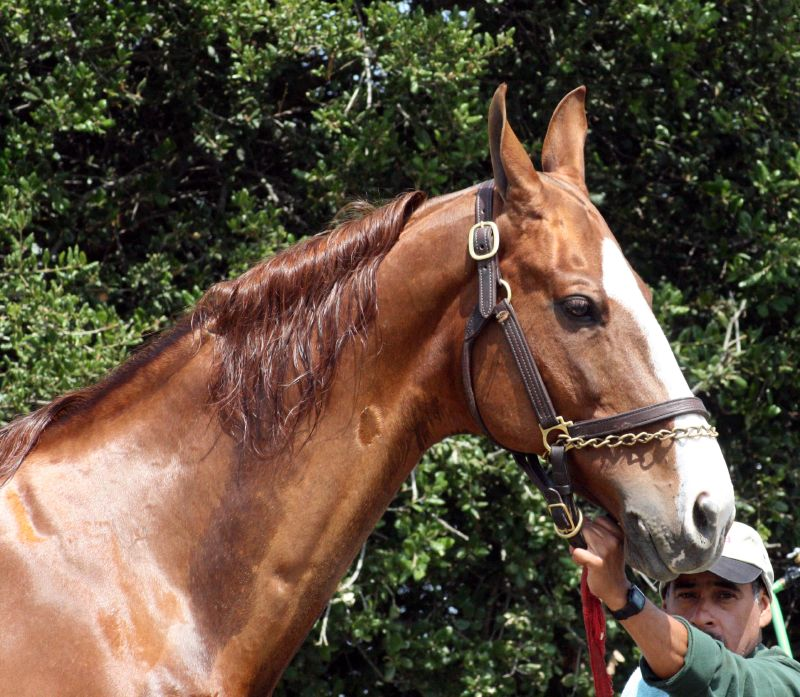
A lead shank applied around the nose.

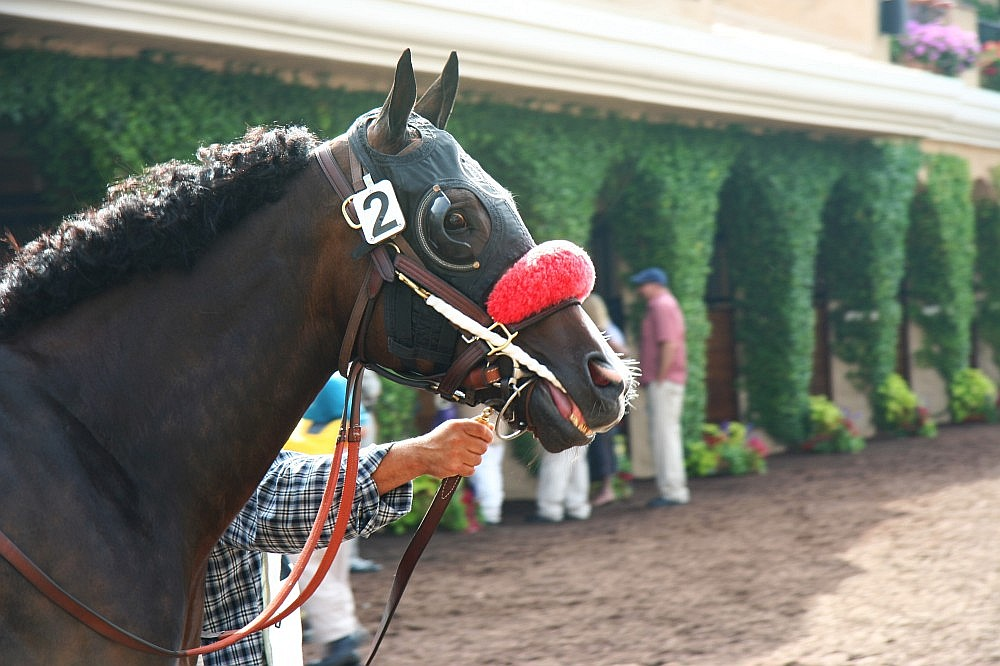
Shank over the gums.

Hard jerks on a lead shank can frighten a horse, damage the head, or cause a horse to rear. Light, short tugs are generally enough to get the attention of a horse. The chain should only come into action when pulled, not when hanging loosely. The handler does not hold the chain itself, as it can hurt the handler's hands should the horse pull back or move its head quickly.

=== Chain shank attachments ===
- Over the nose: The shank is run through the left ring of the halter (on the side of the face), wrapped once around the noseband of the halter, threaded through the right side nose ring of the halter, and attached on the upper right ring of the halter (near the ears of the horse). In some places, this configuration is called a "stallion chain," though the setup is used on horses of all sexes under some circumstances. If the chain is not attached to the upper right ring, the halter can slide into the horse's eye when the shank is applied. When pressure is applied, the shank puts pressure on the nose of the horse, encouraging the animal to become more aware of the handler's signals. If the shank is used harshly, the handler can damage the horse's nose. An alternative use is to take the chain over the nose, around and under the chin, and attached back to itself.
- Under the chin: the shank is run through the lower left ring of the halter, under the chin, through the lower right ring of the halter, and attached either back to itself or to the upper right ring. This tends to make a horse raise his head, but also has a stronger disciplinary effect. The chain, if too short to be attached back on itself, can also be run through the left ring and attached to the right ring, though the halter may also be moved off-center when the shank is applied, and the snap may be subject to pressure that may cause it to fail.
- Chain through mouth: The chain is run through the left lower ring, through the mouth, through the right lower ring, and attached to the upper right ring. This is quite severe and can damage the mouth if used harshly.
- Chain over gum: similar to the chain through the mouth, except the chain is rested on the upper gum of the horse's mouth, under the upper lip. The most severe attachment, may cause bleeding if the horse resists.

== See also ==
- Longe line
- Rein
- Lead (leg)
- Lead change
