= Panic snap =

Mechanism in horse tack

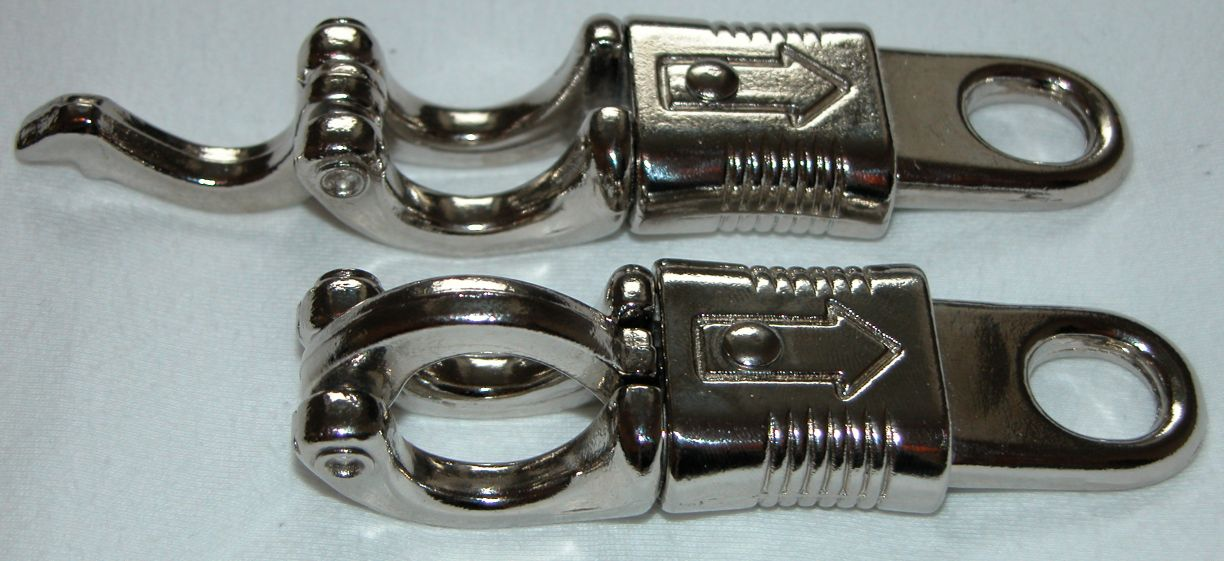
Two typical panic snaps.

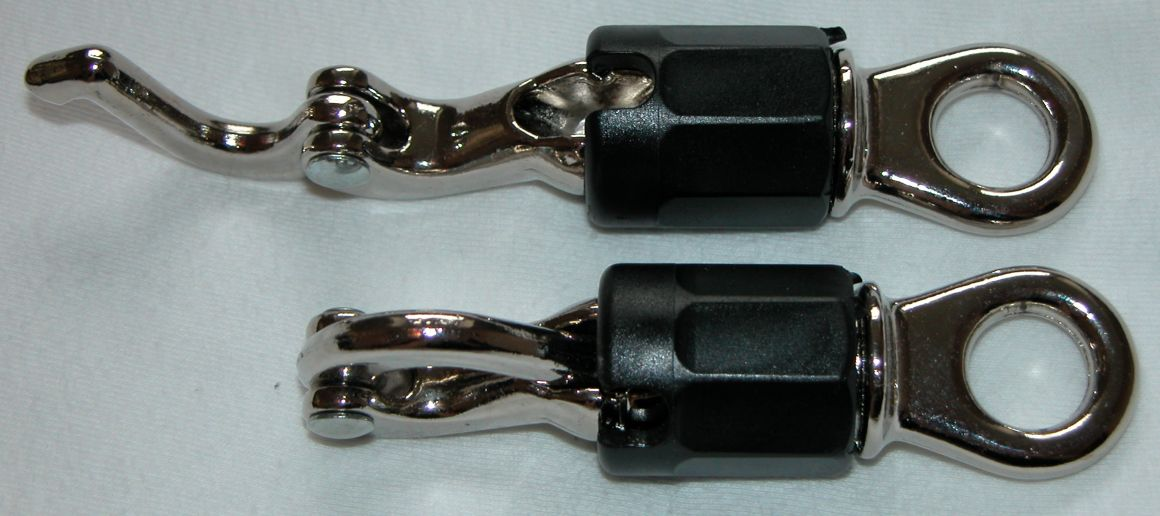
Panic snaps with twistable locks.

In horse tack, a panic snap is a mechanism often used between a lead and a horse harness or halter. They are useful because, unlike swivels or carabiners and similar fittings, they can be disconnected under load, as the panic snap is specially built so that the latching mechanism is separate from the load-bearing structure.

They are sometimes dangerous, however, because leads or ropes under load can flail when freed. Panic snaps also find some use in suspension situations involving relatively light weights. Heavier masses are unsafe with most panic snaps because of the possibility of injury from flailing cordage. They will usually require the services of a millwright.

In BDSM and bondage panic snaps are used to secure bottoms in a safe way. They allow for a single hand to be used to release a bottom in an emergency. In some cases the panic snaps can be placed within reach of the bottom's hand in case the top should have an emergency, although this is not typical. In both cases, there is a potential risk if the release of the panic snaps allows the bottom to fall while unsupported.

Panic snaps are also used on certain types of BDSM leather suspension gear for the same reasons as their use with rope. They are sometimes called quick release cuffs.
