= Fly mask =

Mask used on horses

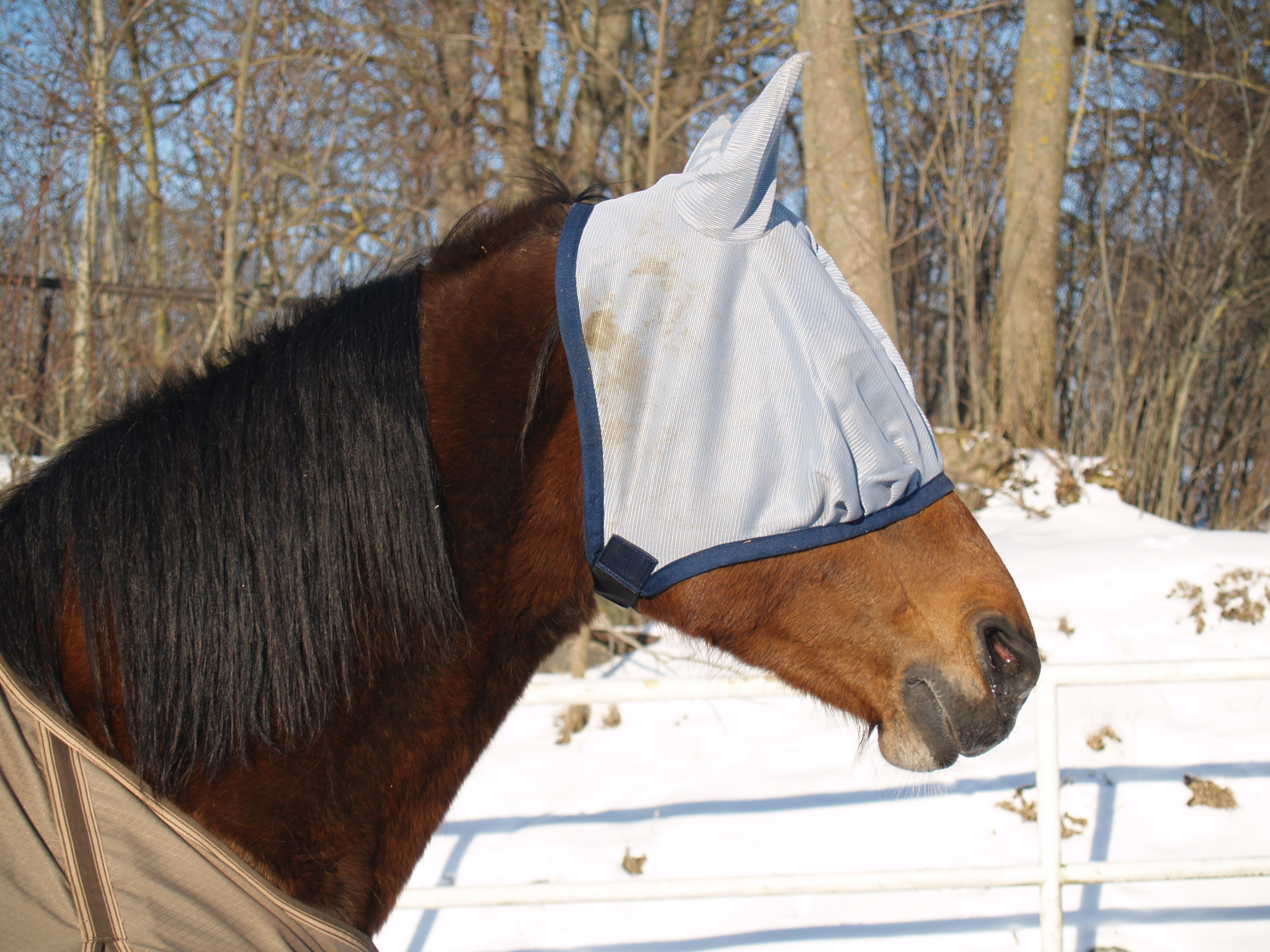
Horse wearing a fly mask with ear covers.

A fly mask or fly cap is a mask used on horses to cover the eyes, jaw, and sometimes the ears and muzzle to protect from flies. The mask is semi-transparent and made from a mesh allowing the horse to see and hear while wearing it. The mask may also provide some protection from UV-light and some are treated with insect repellent. Fly and mosquito protection is an important part of overall horse care, as biting insects are both a source of irritation and also may transmit disease.

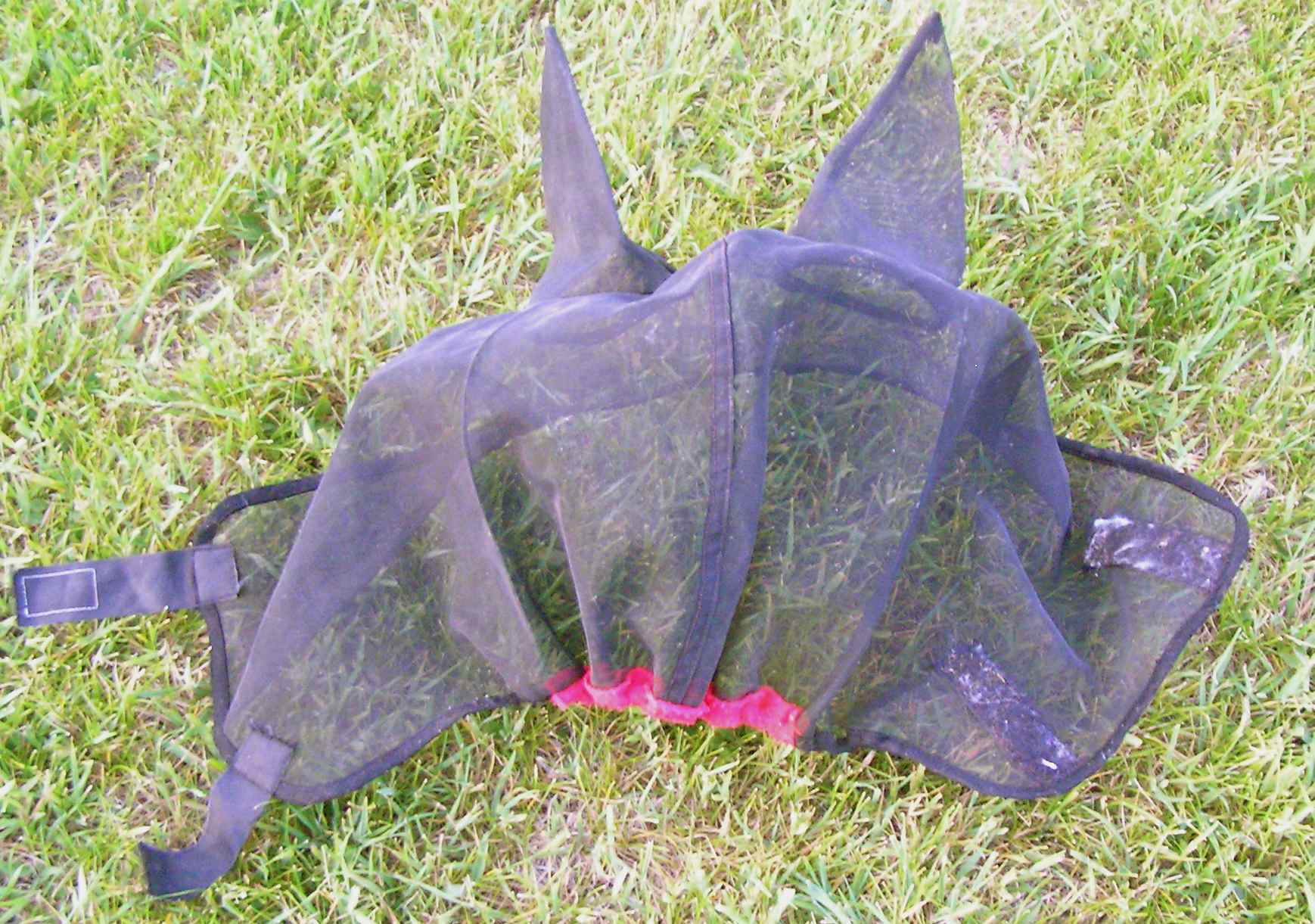
A fly mask with ears, showing attachment and other details. Note mesh is see-through

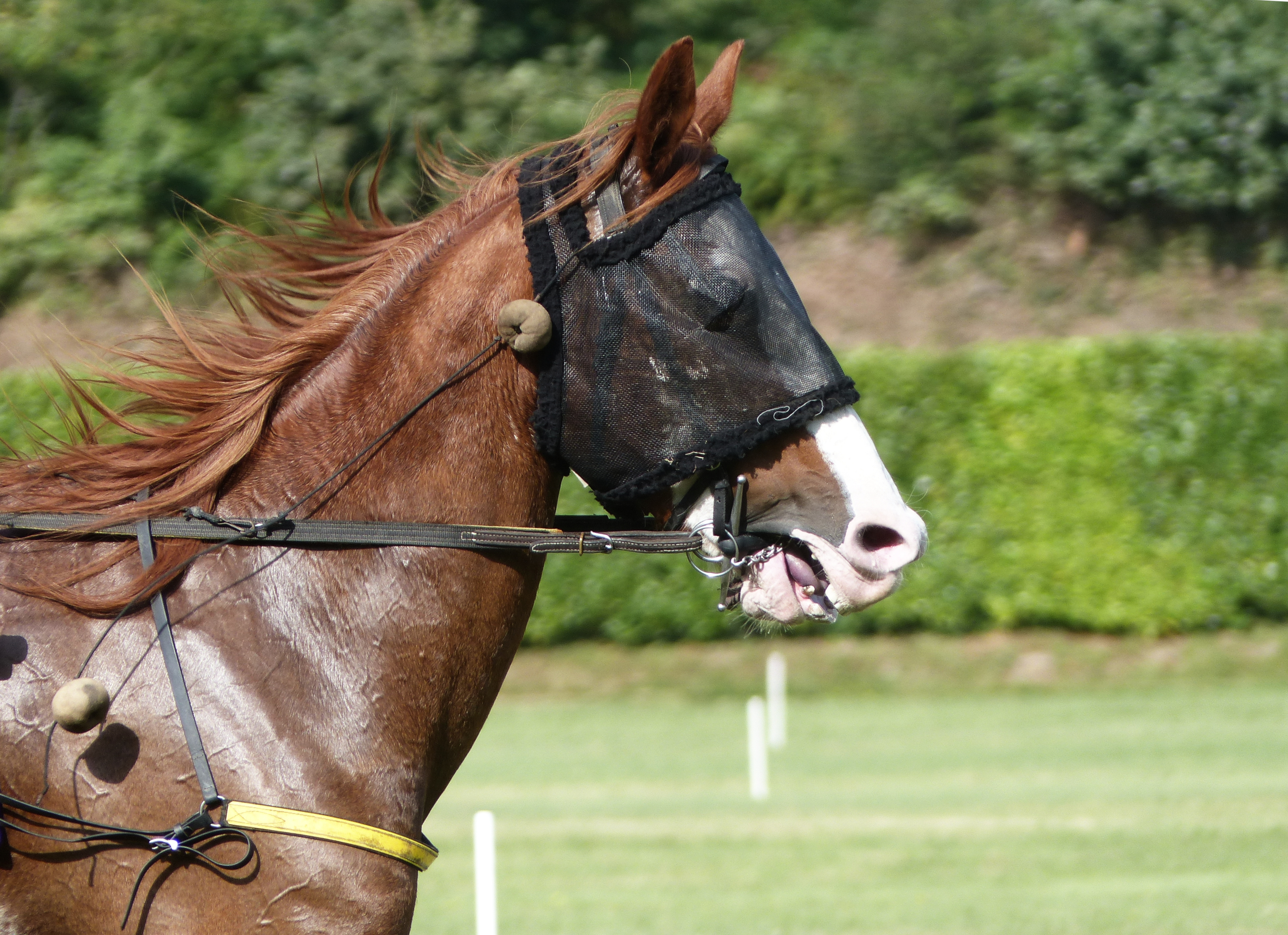
Horse wearing a fly mask without ear covers

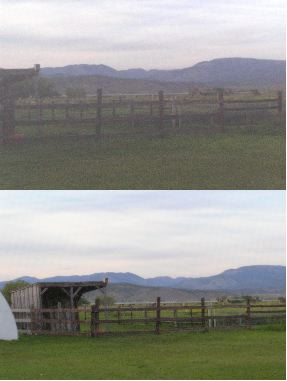
Top photo shows camera view through a mesh fly mask, bottom photo is view without mask. Horses can see through the mesh with minimal impairment. Masks are often removed at night

Most masks are made of black or white mesh, though some are colored, plaid or have silkscreened designs on them that do not interfere with vision. Fly masks are adjusted to cover the upper head and stop about halfway down the face, but the placement of stitched darts prevents the mask from rubbing on the eyes. Most have fleece padding around the muzzle and other sensitive areas. Masks come both with and without covers for the ears. Some designs have an extended flap that covers the muzzle but does not go around the lower jaw or interfere with grazing. Most attach with velcro, but a few high-end designs made with mesh and stretch lycra need to incorporate zippers instead.

A standard fly mask is not generally used while riding, as the stiff mesh interferes with the bridle and the minimal visual impairment of the mesh still presents a safety issue. Other styles of insect protection gear are designed for use with a bridle. One design is a crochet-like "bonnet" for the ears only, designed to be worn under a bridle without rubbing. The other is a soft, very fine mesh face and nose-covering mask designed to be worn with a bridle and not impair vision, but not sturdy enough to withstand turnout.

It is generally recommended that the mask be removed and inspected daily and washed frequently. Some individuals remove the mask at night.

The appearance of fly masks often raises concerns among non-horse owners, as it appears that the horse has been blindfolded. However even a durable mesh is fine enough for the horse to see through. Some masks have sunglasses or cartoon eyeballs silkscreened on them to help passers-by understand their purpose.

== See also ==
- Horse care
- Sallong
- Goggles
- Blinders
