= Halter =

Animal headgear

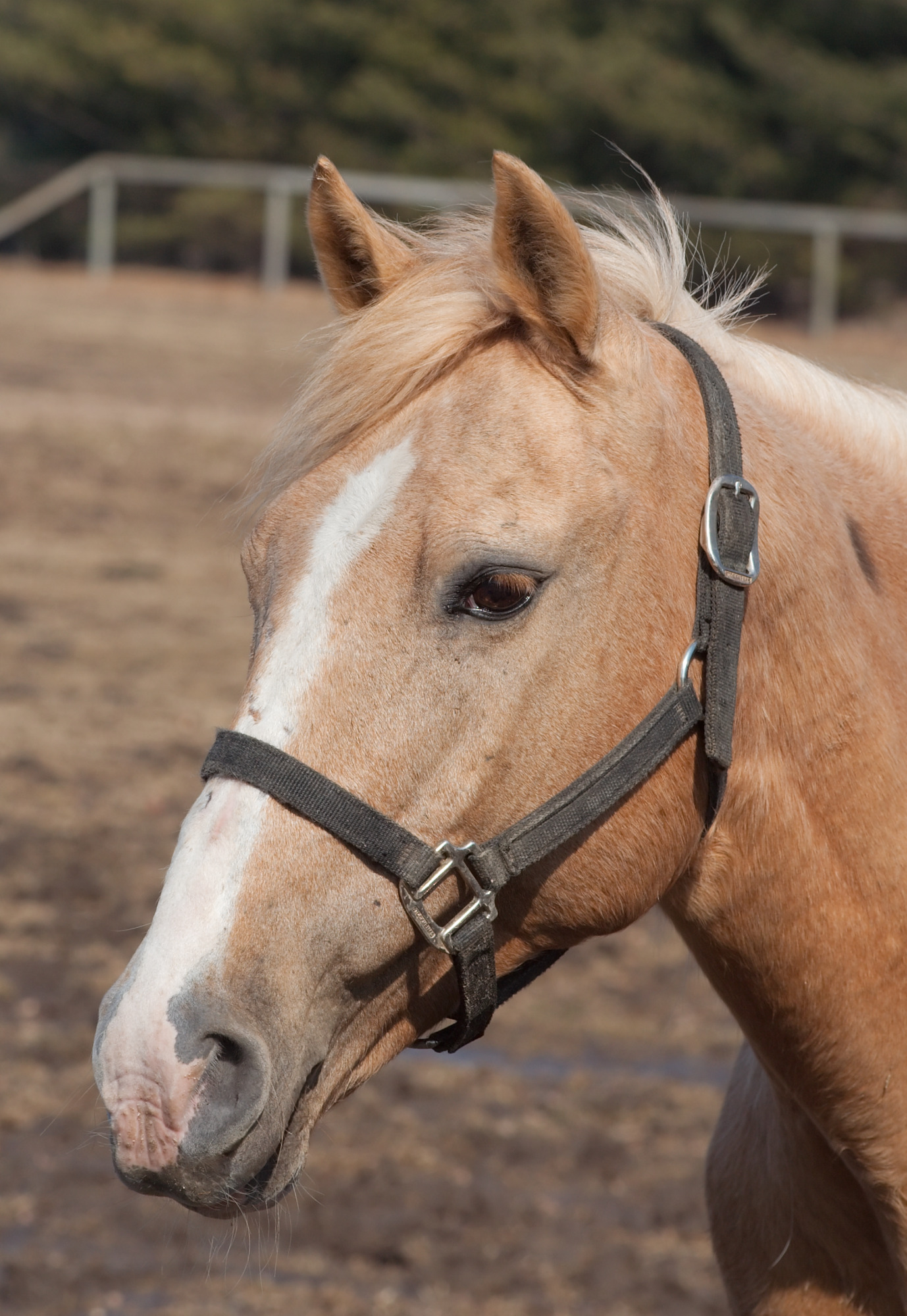
Horse wearing a nylon web halter (US) or headcollar

A halter or headcollar is headgear placed on animals used to lead or tie up livestock and, occasionally, other animals; it fits behind the ears (behind the poll), and around the muzzle. To handle the animal, usually a lead rope is attached. On smaller animals, such as dogs, a leash is attached to the halter.

== History ==
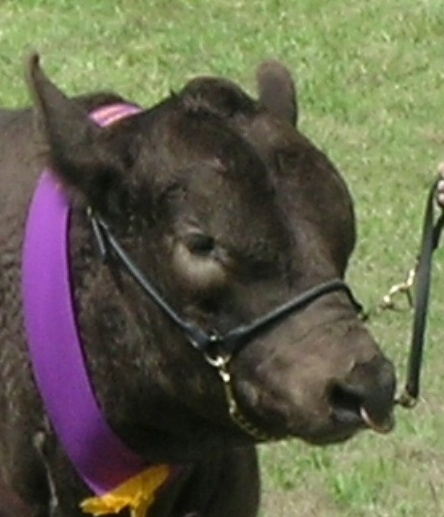
A show halter on a Murray Grey bull

Halters may be as old as the early domestication of animals, and their history is not as well studied as that of the bridle or hackamore. The word "halter" derives from the Germanic words meaning "that by which anything is held."

One halter design was patented in the United States by Henry Wagner of Toledo, Iowa February 13, 1894.

== Uses ==
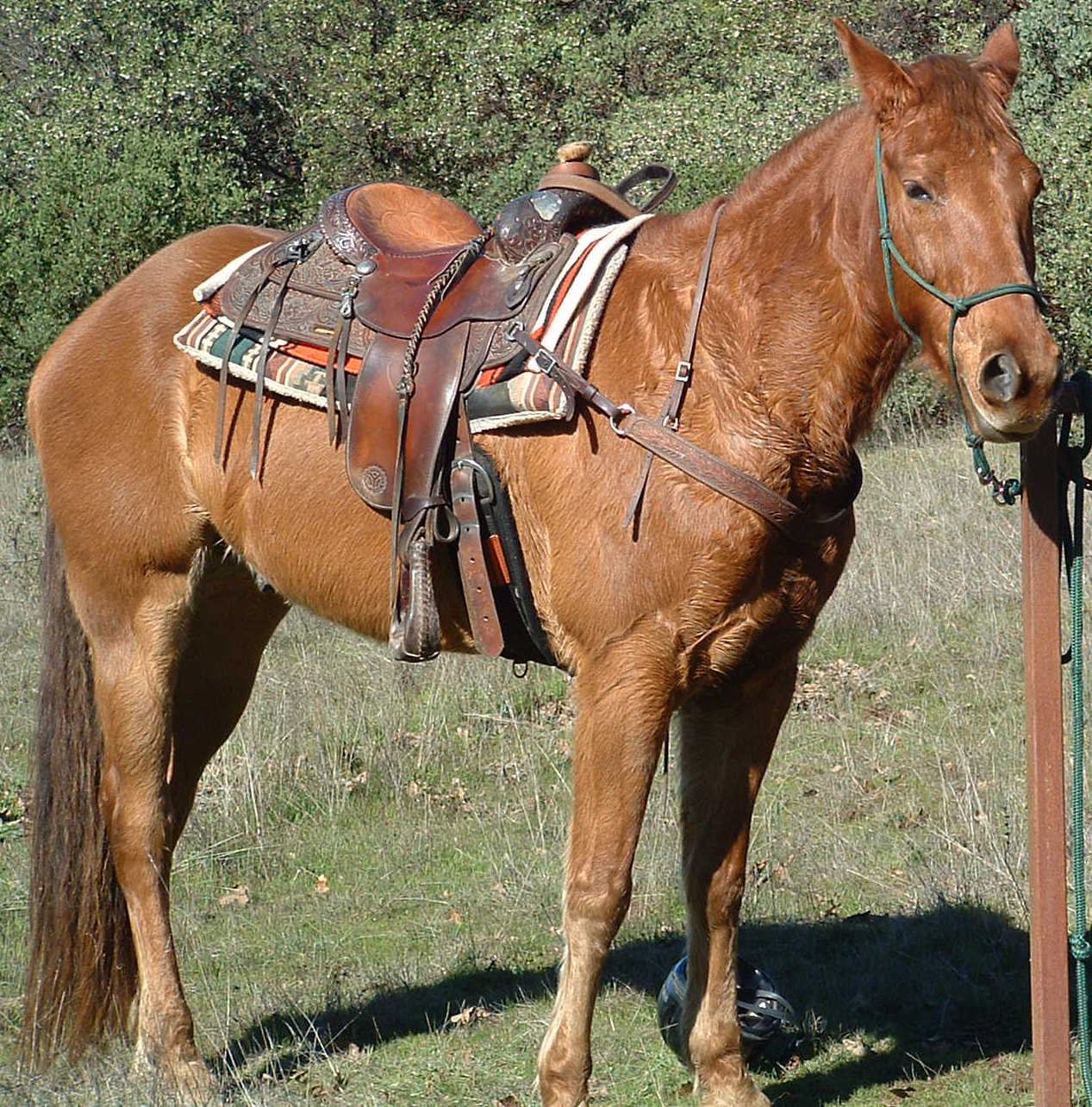
A horse tied to a post with a halter

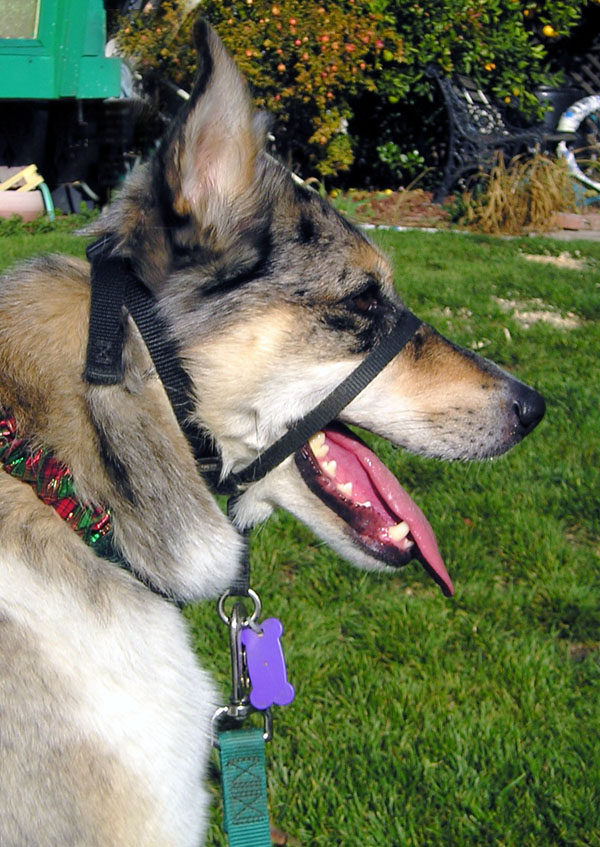
Dog wearing a halter-style collar.

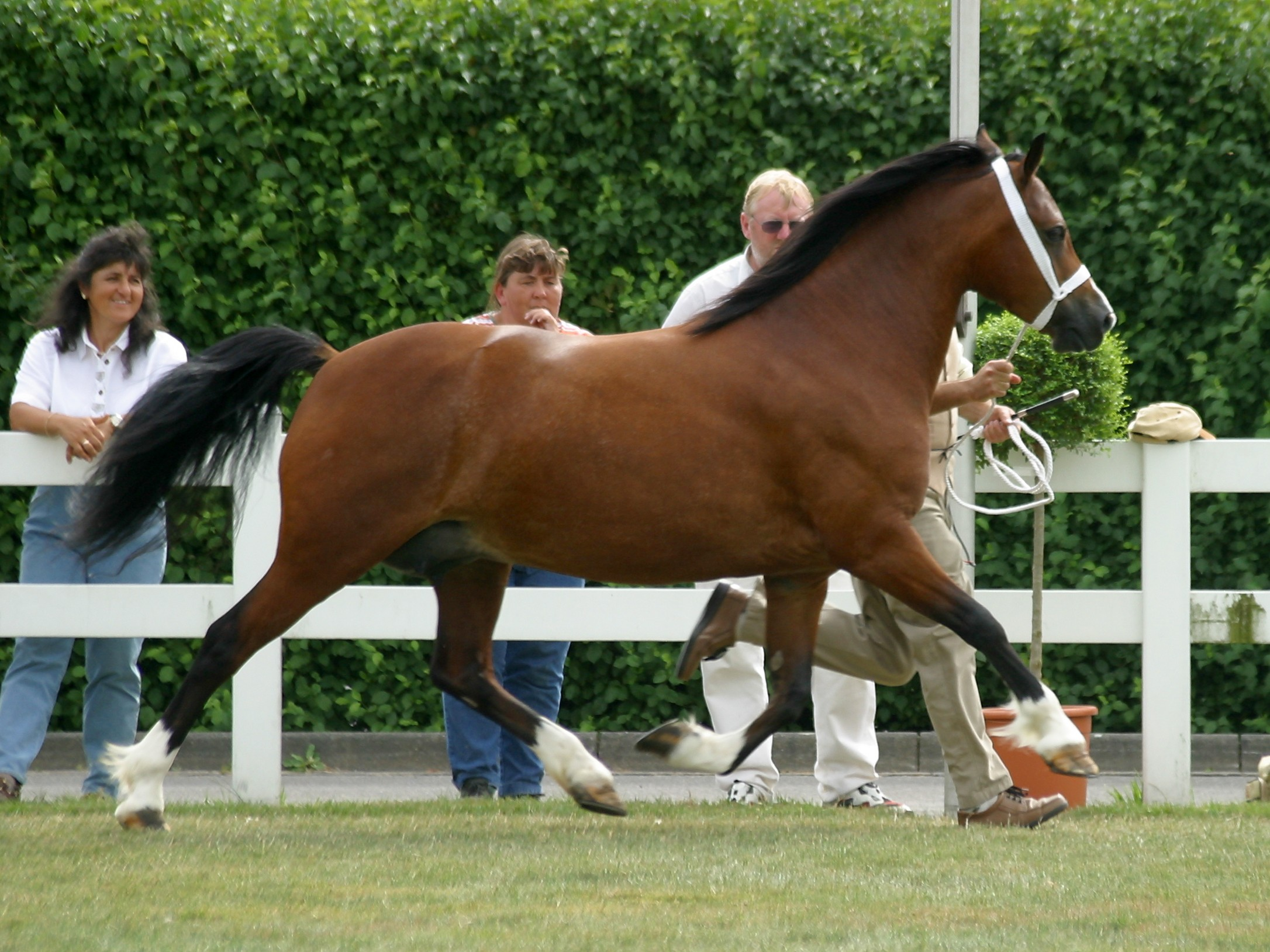
Horse shown in hand, wearing a Yorkshire halter.

A halter is used to control an animal when leading on the ground, and as a restraint when tying them up. It is used on many different types of livestock. Halters are most closely associated with Equidae such as horses, donkeys, and mules. However, they are also used on farm animals such as cattle and goats and other working animals such as camels, llamas, and yaks. Halters generally are not used on elephants or on predators, though there are halters made for dogs.

Halters are often plain in design, used as working equipment on a daily basis. In addition to the halter, a lead line, lead shank or lead rope is required to actually lead or tie the animal. It is most often attached to the halter at a point under the jaw, or less often, at the cheek, usually with a snap, but occasionally spliced directly onto the halter. A standard working lead rope is approximately 9 to 12 feet (2.7 to 3.7 m) long.

Specially designed halters, sometimes highly decorated, are used for in-hand or "halter" classes at horse shows and in other livestock shows. When an animal is shown in an exhibition, the show halter is fitted more closely than a working halter and may have a lead shank that tightens on the head so that commands from the handler may be more discreetly transmitted by means of the leadline. A shank that tightens on the animal's head when pulled is not used for tying the animal.

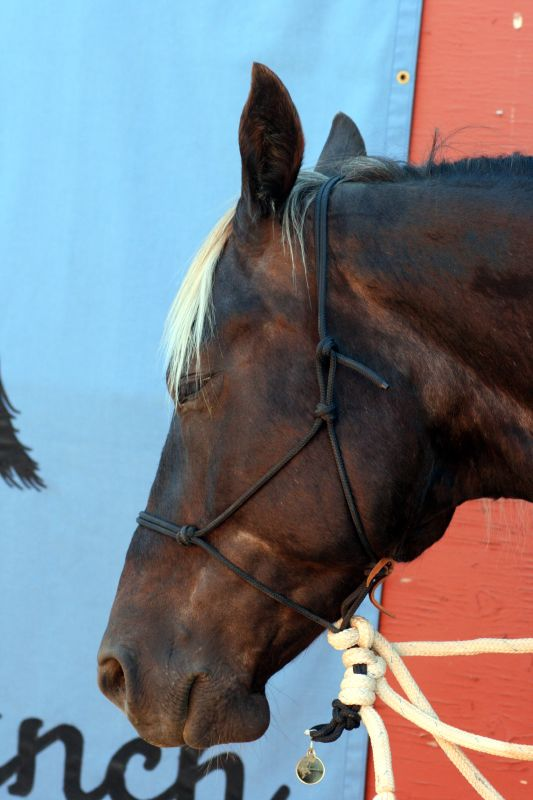
A halter with mecate reins added for control while riding.

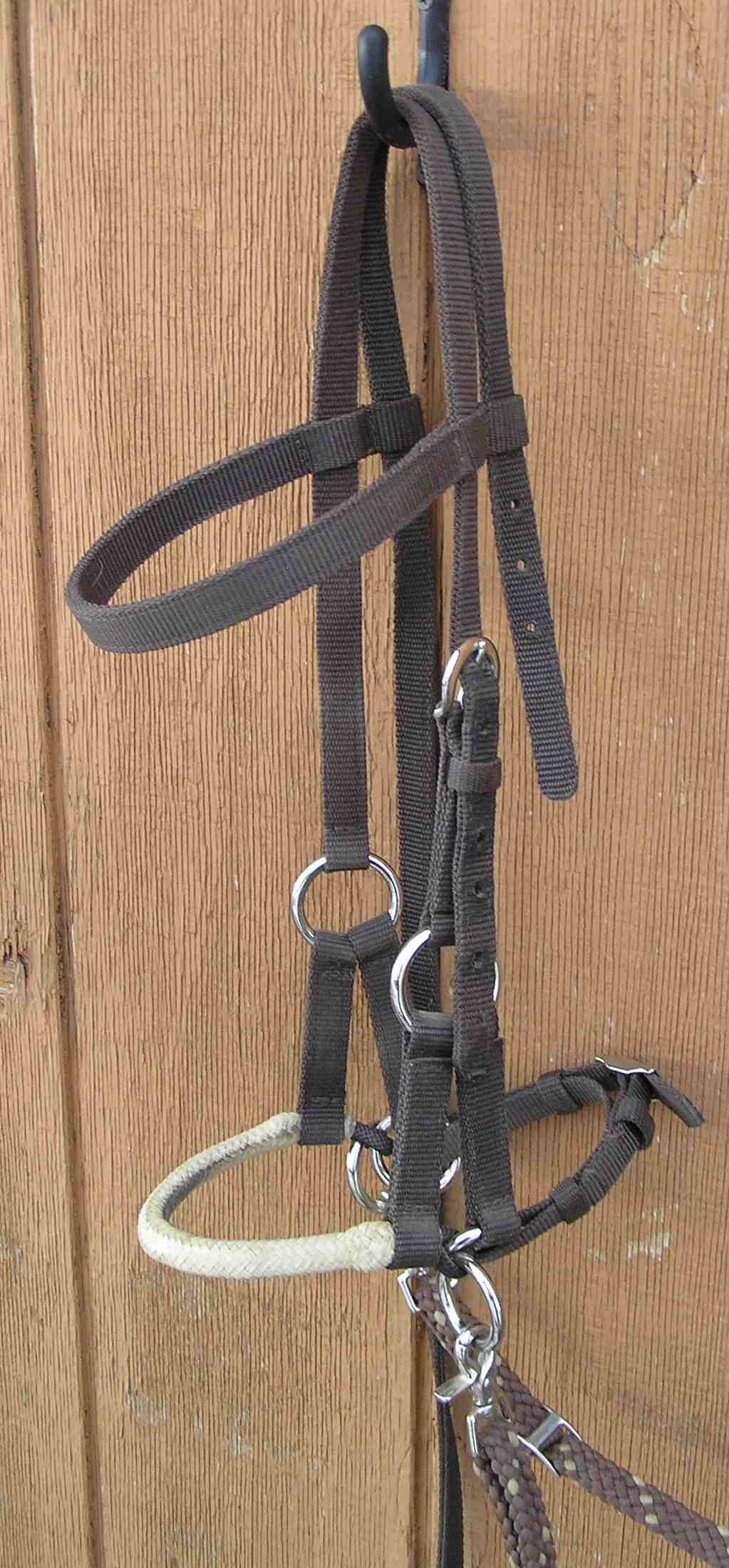
A sidepull uses a heavy noseband and lateral leverage for control

Halter designs modified for extra control when riding

Halters are designed to catch, hold, lead and tie animals, and nothing else. However, some people ride horses using a halter instead of a bridle. In most cases, it is not safe to ride in an ordinary stable halter because it fits loosely and provides no leverage to the rider should a horse panic or bolt. It is particularly unsafe if the lead rope is used as a single rein, attached to the leading ring under the jaw. In some cases, mecate-style reins may be added to a rope halter, creating a modified form of hackamore, and equipment called a "sidepull" has a heavier noseband and two reins added on cheek rings placed each side to provide control.

== Designs ==
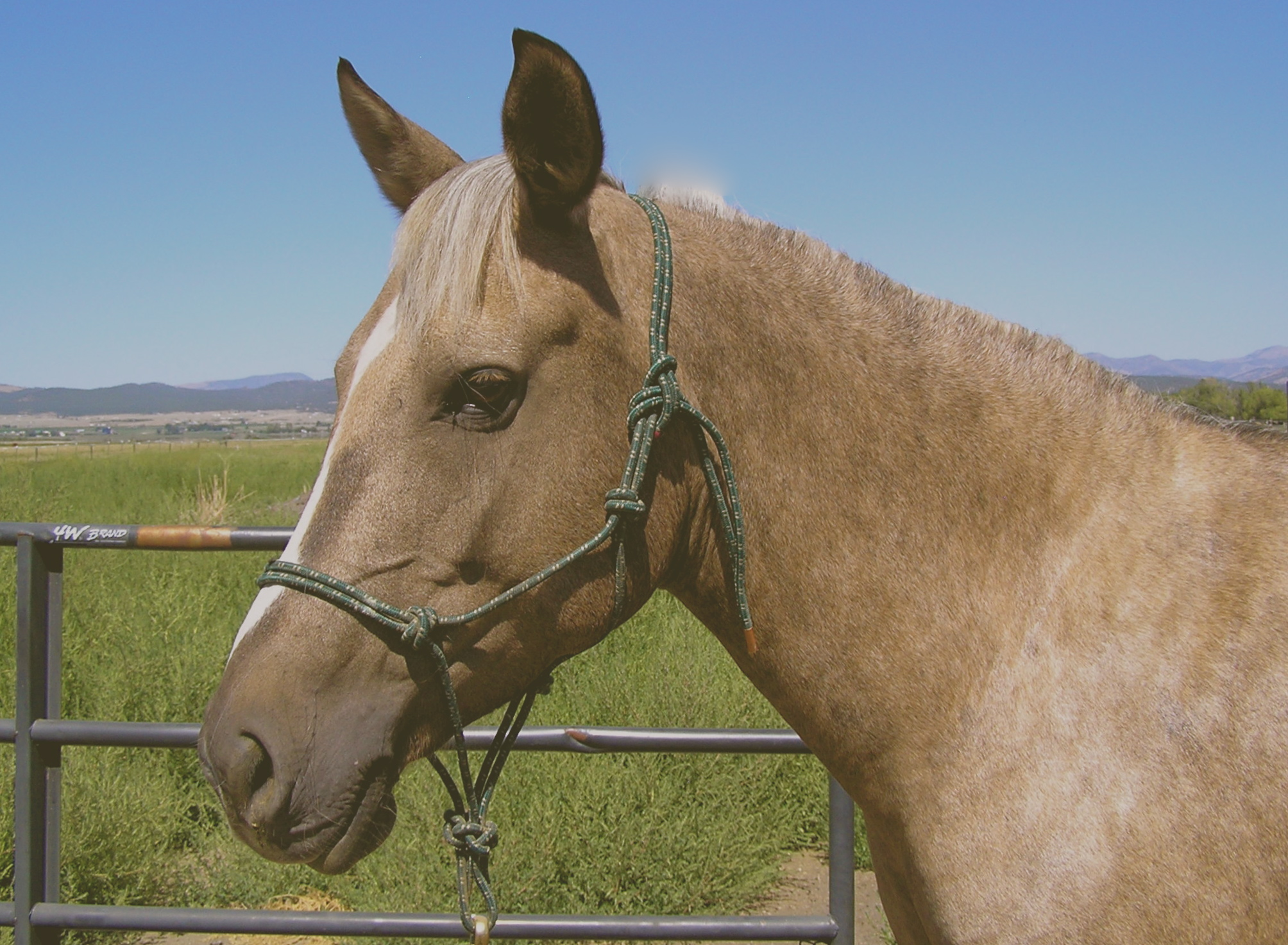
A rope horse halter

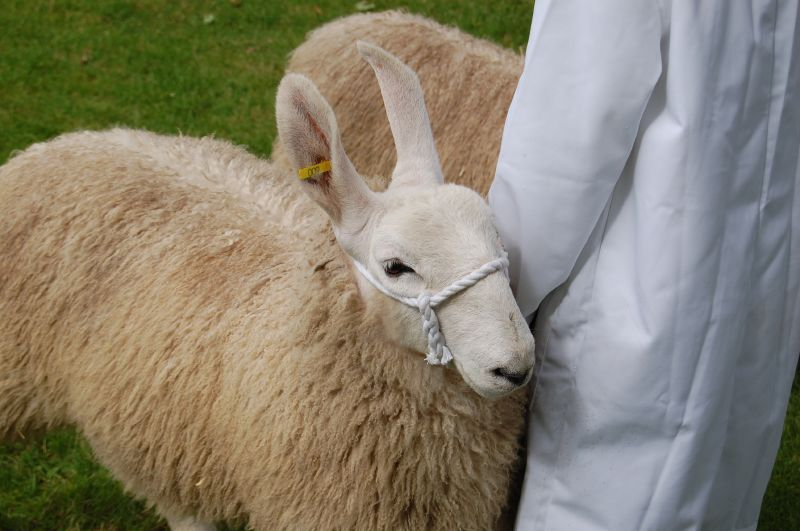
Sheep wearing a cotton rope halter.

Halters may be classified into two broad categories, depending on whether the material used is flat or round. Materials used include leather, rawhide, rope, and many different fibers, including nylon, polyester, cotton, and jute. Fibers may be woven into flat webbing or twisted into round rope. Flat or round dictates the construction method: flat materials normally are sewn to buckles and rings at attachment points; round materials are knotted or spliced. Knotted halters often are made from a single piece of rope.

The rope halter, occasionally called a "cowboy halter", is associated with the western riding tradition, popularized with the wave of interest in natural horsemanship. It is called an "American halter" in France. or an "ethological halter" licol éthologique, literally a "halter with knots". In German, it is called a knotenhalfter.

Show halters may be flat or round, but are generally made of leather or a similar synthetic and are designed to enhance the attractiveness of an animal's head as well as to exert precise control.

== Horse halters ==
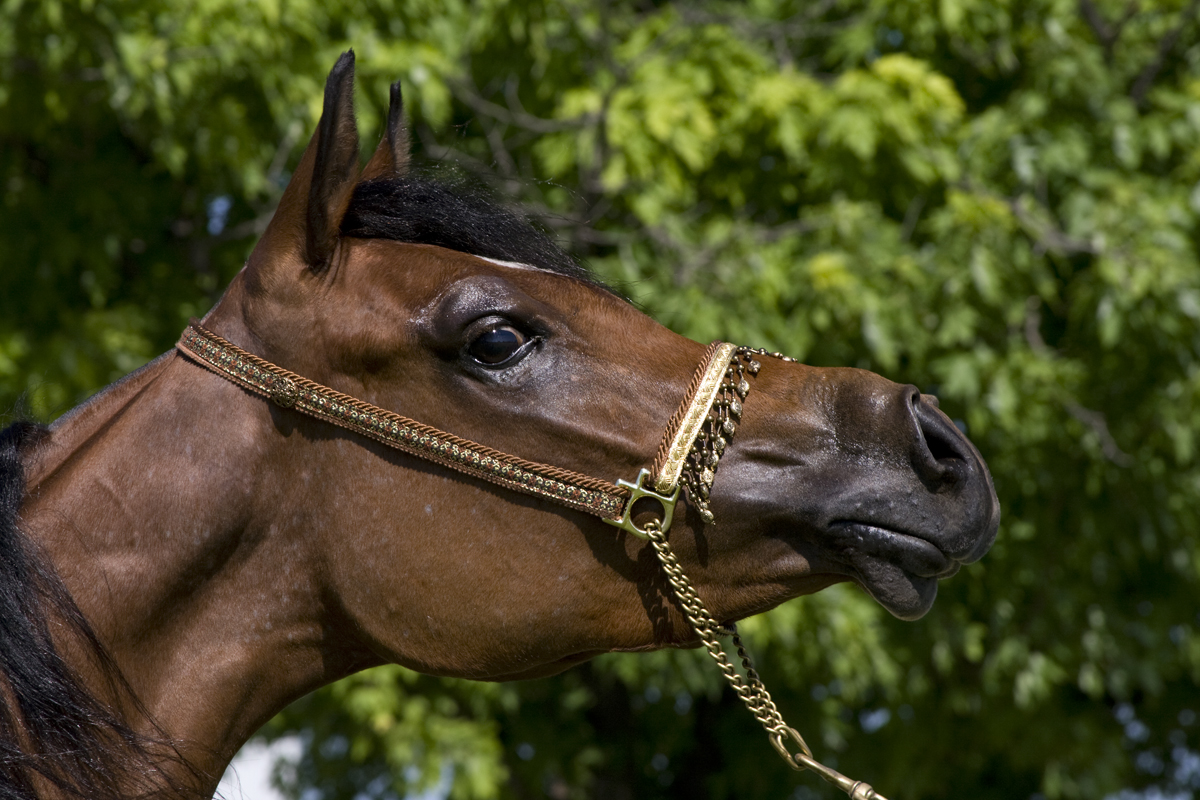
An Arabian horse in a stylized show halter

Horse halters are sometimes confused with a bridle or a hackamore. The primary difference between a halter and a bridle is that a halter is used by a handler on the ground to lead or tie up an animal, but a bridle or hackamore is generally used by a person who is riding or driving an animal that has been trained in this use. A halter is safer for tying, as the bit of a bridle or the heavier noseband of a hackamore may injure the horse if the horse sets back while tied. In addition, bridles and hackamores are usually made of lighter materials and will break. In some cases, a bridle may be used when handling an equine on the ground in order to exert more pressure and control.

One common halter design is made of either flat nylon webbing or flat leather, has a noseband that passes around the muzzle with one ring under the jaw, usually used to attach a lead rope, and two rings on either side of the head. The noseband is usually adjusted to lie about halfway between the end of the cheekbones and the corners of the mouth, crossing over the strong, bony part of the face. The noseband connects to a cheekpiece on either side that go up next to the cheekbone to meet with a ring on either side that usually is placed just above the level of the eye. These rings meet the throatlatch and the crownpiece. The crownpiece is a long strap on the right-hand side of the halter that goes up behind the ears, over the poll and is buckled to a shorter strap coming up from the left. The throatlatch goes under the throat, and sometimes has a snap or clip that allows the halter to be removed in a manner similar to the bridle. Many halters have another short strap connecting the noseband and the throatlatch.

The halter design made of rope also has the same basic sections, but usually is joined by knots instead of sewn into rings. Most designs have no metal parts, other than, in some cases, a metal ring under the jaw where the lead rope snaps, or, occasionally, a recessed hook attachment where the crownpiece can be connected. However, in many cases, a loop is formed in the left side of the crownpiece and the right side of the crownpiece simply is brought over the horse's head, through the loop and tied with a sheet bend.

=== Accessories ===
To lead or tie an animal a lead rope or leash is used. The lead is attached to the halter most often at a point under the jaw, less often at the cheek, and less often, over the nose. On horses, a lighter version of a headcollar or headstall is also used to attach a fly veil of waxed cotton strands or light leather strips onto a browband. Some fly masks are also made in a similar pattern to a headcollar and are often fastened with velcro tabs. These masks may also have ear and nose protection added to them. On both horses and dogs, halters may be used to attach a muzzle.

== Safety and security issues ==
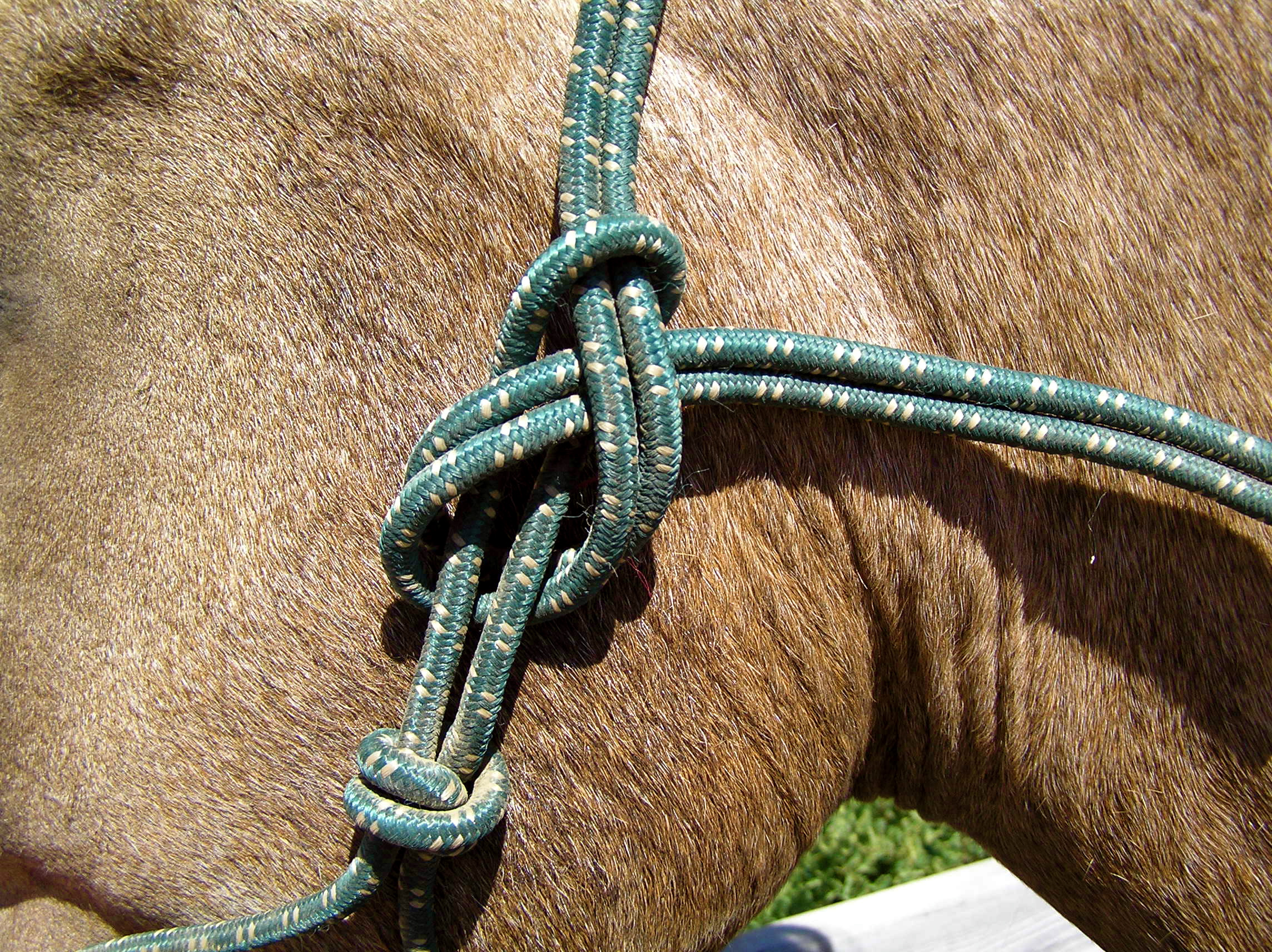
A modified sheet bend with the end falling away from the horse's head is used to secure a rope halter that lacks buckles

For tying, it is disputed if a halter should be made strong enough not to break under stress, or if it should give way when tension reaches a certain point in order to prevent injury to the animal. Usually the issue is of minimal concern if a tied animal is attended and the lead rope is tied with a slip knot that can be quickly released if the animal panics. However, in cases where a non-slip knot is tied, or if a soft rope is drawn tight and the knot cannot be released, or if the animal is left unsupervised, an animal panicking and attempting to escape can be seriously injured. Those who argue that the risk of injury is more of a concern than the risk of escape recommend halter designs that incorporate breakaway elements, such as a leather crownpiece, breakaway buckles, or easily detachable lead rope. Those who believe that escape is the greater danger, either due to concerns about escape or creating a recurring bad habit in an animal that learns to break loose that could become unable to be kept tied at all, recommend sturdy designs that will not break unless the handler deliberately releases a slipknot or cuts the lead rope. Between the two camps are those who recommend sturdy halters that will not break under normal pressure from a momentarily recalcitrant or frightened animal, but ultimately will break in a true panic situation, such as a fall.

Some users have the animal wear a halter at all times, even when stalled or turned out. Others have the animal wear a halter only when being led, held, or tied. The advantages of leaving a halter on are that the animal is often easier to catch. The disadvantages are that an animal may catch the halter on an object and become trapped or injured in some fashion. While experts advise leaving halters off when animals are turned out, if halters are left on unattended animals, breakaway designs that still will hold for everyday leading are recommended.

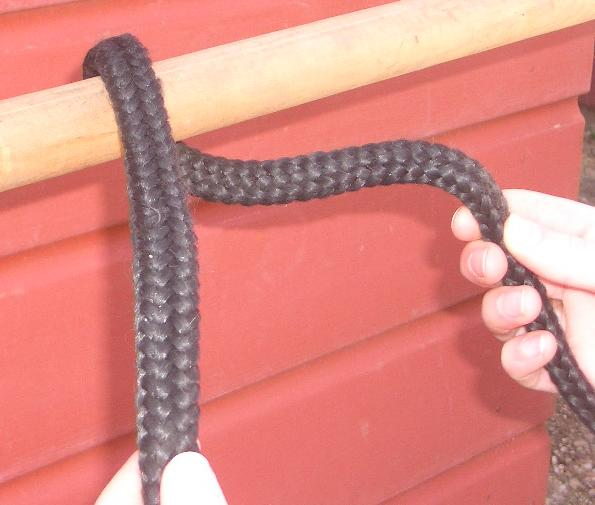
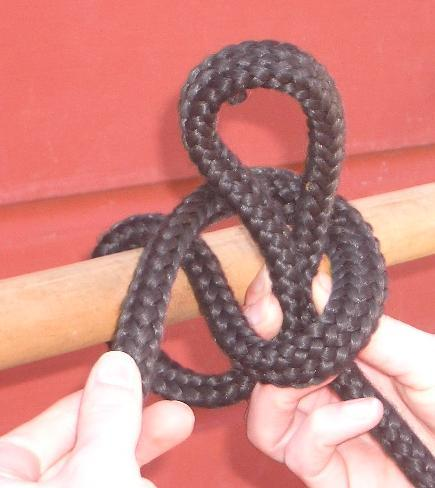
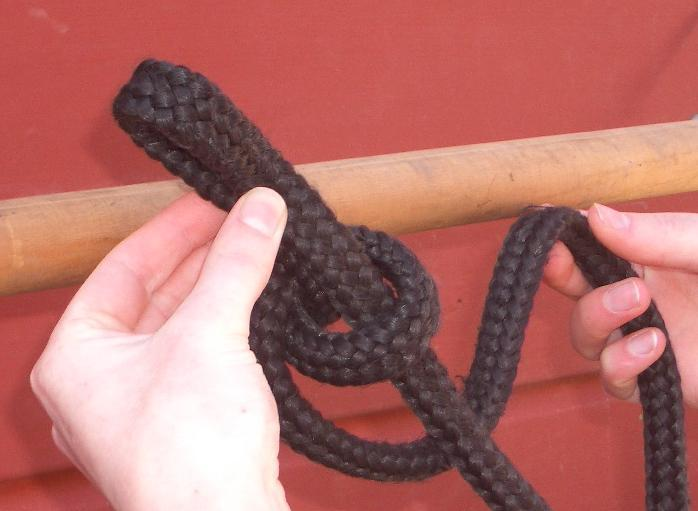
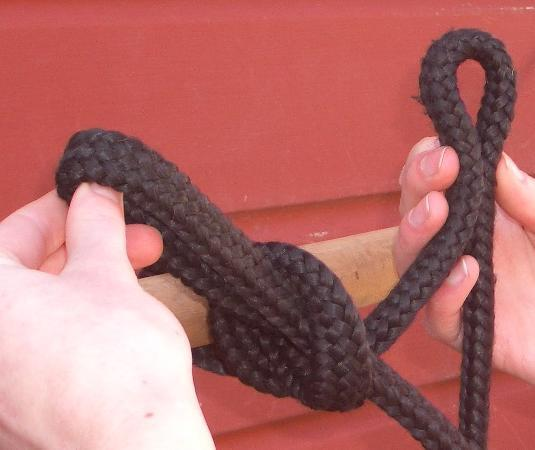
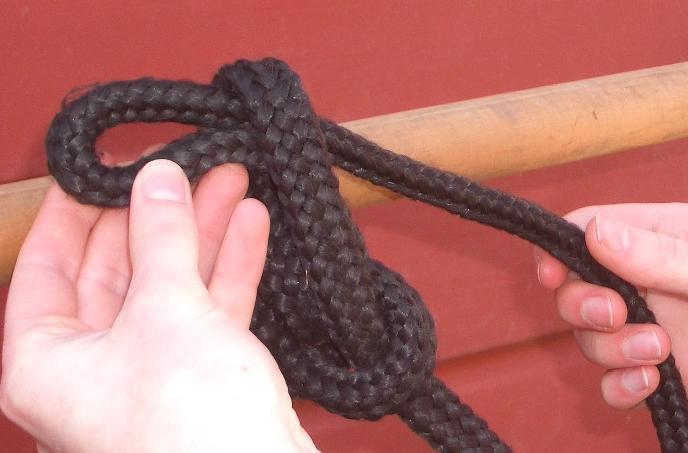
Steps in tying a safety slip knot on a lead rope

== Sources ==
- https://www.equisearch.com/uncategorized/your-choice-horse-halter-matters/
