= Cowboy =

Traditional ranch worker in North America

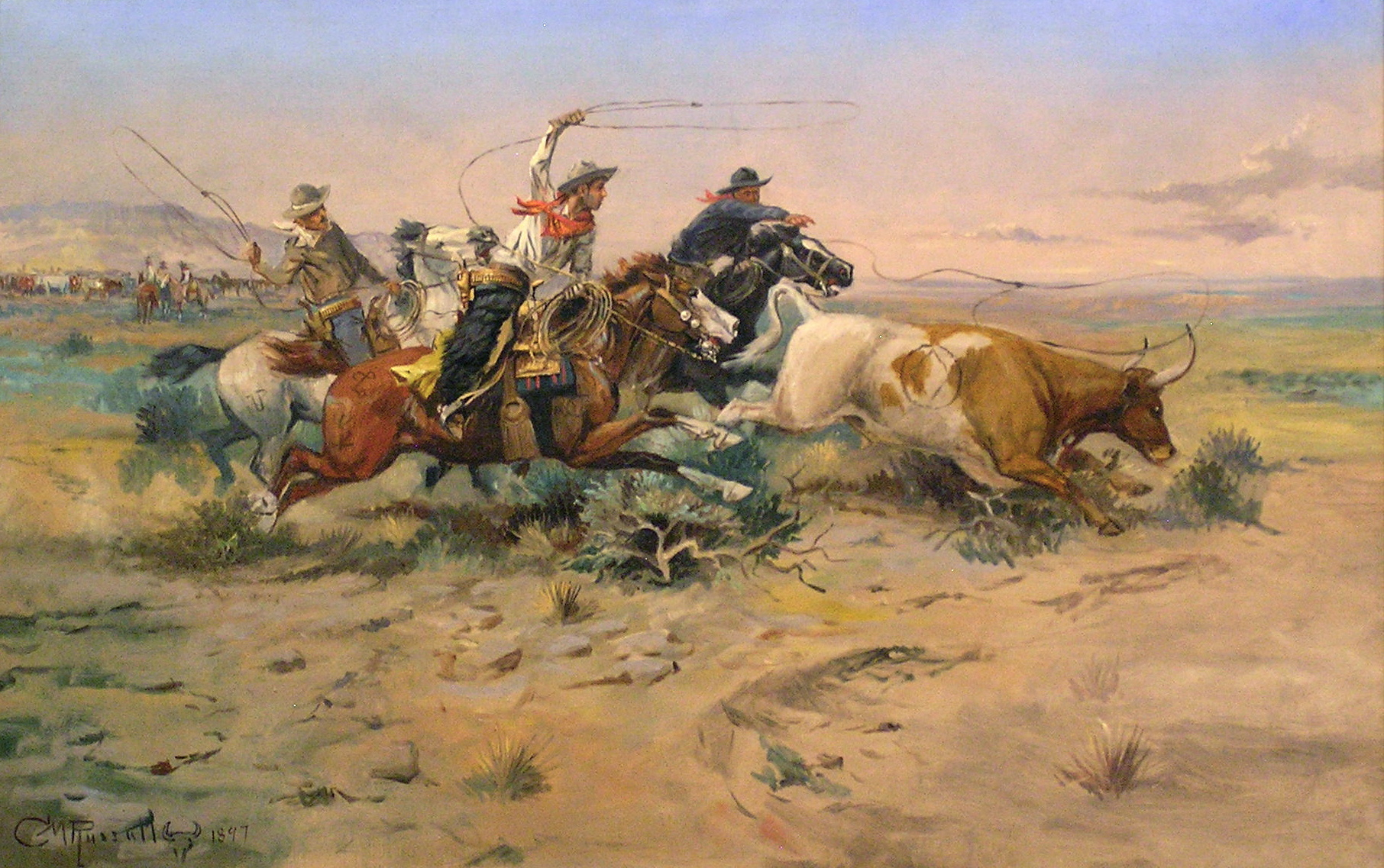
Cowboys portrayed in Western art. The Herd Quitter by C. M. Russell

A cowboy is an animal herder who tends cattle on ranches in North America, traditionally on horseback, and often performs many other ranch-related tasks. The historic American cowboy of the late 19th century arose from the vaquero traditions of northern Mexico, which trace their roots back to Spanish settlers from Andalusia and became a figure of special significance and legend. A subtype, called a wrangler, specifically tends the horses used to work cattle. In addition to ranch work, some cowboys work for or participate in rodeos. Cowgirls, first defined as such in the late 19th century, had a less-well documented historical role, but in the modern world work at identical tasks and have obtained considerable respect for their achievements. Cattle handlers in many other parts of the world, particularly South America and Australia, perform work similar to the cowboy. The cowboy has deep historic roots tracing back to Spain and the earliest European settlers of the Americas. Over the centuries, differences in terrain and climate, and the influence of cattle-handling traditions from multiple cultures, created several distinct styles of equipment, clothing and animal handling. Equipment and techniques have adapted over time, though many classic traditions are preserved.

== Etymology and mainstream usage ==
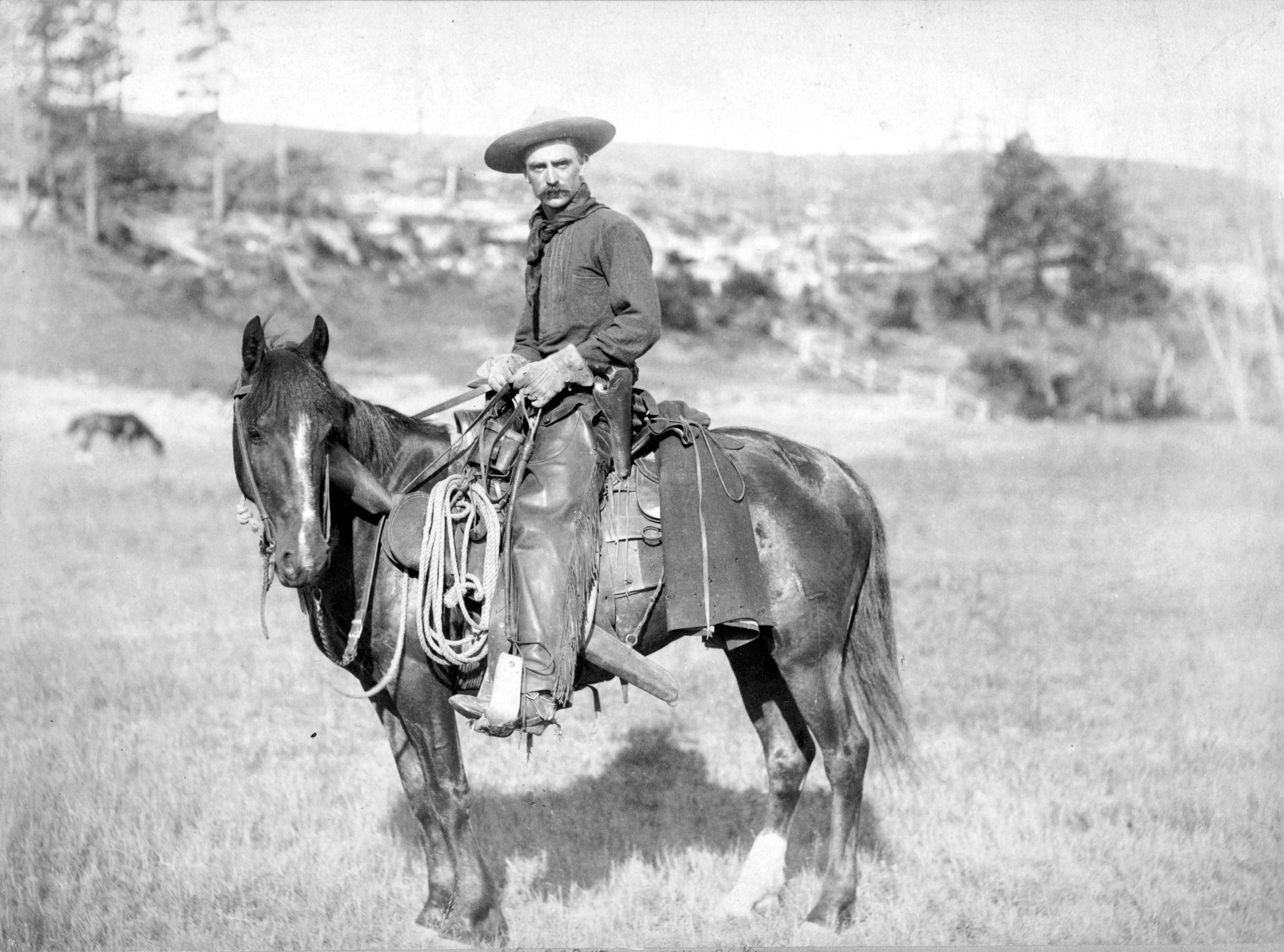
American cowboy, 1887

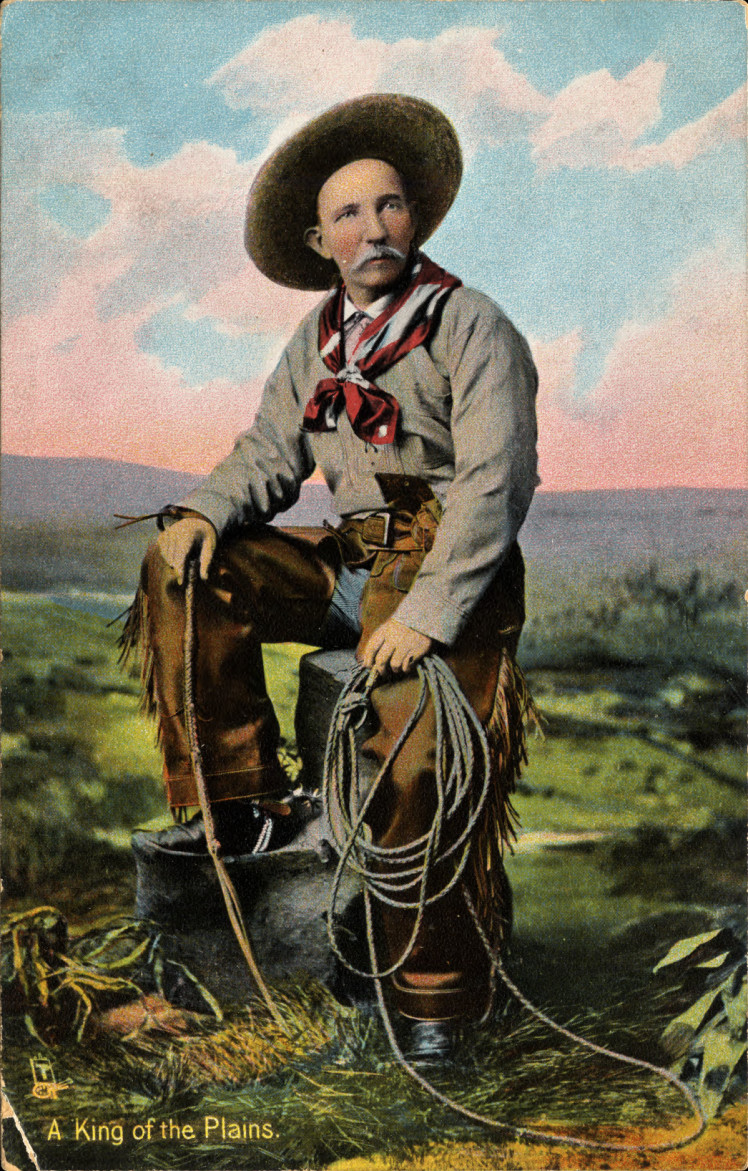
"King of the Plains" postcard, 1898–1924

The English word cowboy has an origin from several earlier terms that referred to both age and to cattle or cattle-tending work. The English word cowboy was derived from vaquero, Spanish for cowherd or cattle-herder, from vaca, meaning "cow", and the suffix -ero used in nouns to indicate a trade, job, occupation, profession or position; itself from the Latin: vaccārius, which means cowherd, from vacca, meaning “cow”, and the suffix -ārius used to form nouns denoting an agent of use, such as a dealer or artisan, from other nouns.

"Cowboy" was first used in print by Jonathan Swift in 1725, and was used in the British Isles from 1820 to 1850 to describe young boys who tended the family or community cows. Originally though, the English word "cowherd" was used to describe a cattle herder (similar to "shepherd", a sheep herder), and often referred to a pre-adolescent or early adolescent boy, who usually worked on foot. This word is very old in the English language, originating prior to the year 1000.

By 1849 "cowboy" had developed its modern sense as an adult cattle handler of the American West. Variations on the word appeared later. "Cowhand" appeared in 1852, and "cowpoke" in 1881, originally restricted to the individuals who prodded cattle with long poles to load them onto railroad cars for shipping. Names for a cowboy in American English include buckaroo, cowpoke, cowhand, and cowpuncher. Another English word for a cowboy, buckaroo, is an anglicization of vaquero (Spanish pronunciation: [baˈkeɾo]).

Today, "cowboy" is a term common throughout the west and particularly in the Great Plains and Rocky Mountains, "buckaroo" is used primarily in the Great Basin and California, and "cowpuncher" mostly in Texas and surrounding states.

Equestrianism required skills and an investment in horses and equipment rarely available to or entrusted to a child, though in some cultures boys rode a donkey while going to and from pasture. In antiquity, herding of sheep, cattle and goats was often the job of minors, and still is a task for young people in various Developing World cultures.

Because of the time and physical ability needed to develop necessary skills, both historic and modern cowboys often began as an adolescent. Historically, cowboys earned wages as soon as they developed sufficient skill to be hired (often as young as 12 or 13). If not crippled by injury, cowboys may handle cattle or horses for a lifetime. In the United States, a few women also took on the tasks of ranching and learned the necessary skills, though the "cowgirl" (discussed below) did not become widely recognized or acknowledged until the close of the 19th century. On western ranches today, the working cowboy is usually an adult. Responsibility for herding cattle or other livestock is no longer considered suitable for children or early adolescents. Boys and girls growing up in a ranch environment often learn to ride horses and perform basic ranch skills as soon as they are physically able, usually under adult supervision. Such youths, by their late teens, are often given responsibilities for "cowboy" work on the ranch.

=== Other historic word uses ===
"Cowboy" was used during the American Revolution to describe American fighters who opposed the movement for independence. Claudius Smith, an outlaw identified with the Loyalist cause, was called the "Cow-boy of the Ramapos" due to his penchant for stealing oxen, cattle and horses from colonists and giving them to the British. In the same period, a number of guerrilla bands operated in Westchester County, which marked the dividing line between the British and American forces. These groups were made up of local farmhands who would ambush convoys and carry out raids on both sides. There were two separate groups: the "skinners" fought for the pro-independence side, while the "cowboys" supported the British.

In the Tombstone, Arizona area during the 1880s, the term "cowboy" or "cow-boy" was used pejoratively to describe men who had been implicated in various crimes. One loosely organized band was dubbed "The Cowboys", and profited from smuggling cattle, alcohol, and tobacco across the U.S.–Mexico border. The San Francisco Examiner wrote in an editorial, "Cowboys [are] the most reckless class of outlaws in that wild country ... infinitely worse than the ordinary robber." It became an insult in the area to call someone a "cowboy", as it suggested he was a horse thief, robber, or outlaw. Cattlemen were generally called herders or ranchers. Other synonyms for cowboy were ranch hand, range hand or trail hand, although duties and pay were not entirely identical. The Cowboys' activities were ultimately curtailed by the Gunfight at the O.K. Corral and the resulting Earp Vendetta Ride.

== History ==
The origins of the cowboy tradition come from Spain, beginning with the hacienda system of medieval Spain. This style of cattle ranching spread throughout much of the Iberian peninsula, and later was imported to the Americas. Both regions possessed a dry climate with sparse grass, thus large herds of cattle required vast amounts of land to obtain sufficient forage. The need to cover distances greater than a person on foot could manage gave rise to the development of the horseback-mounted vaquero.

=== Spanish roots ===
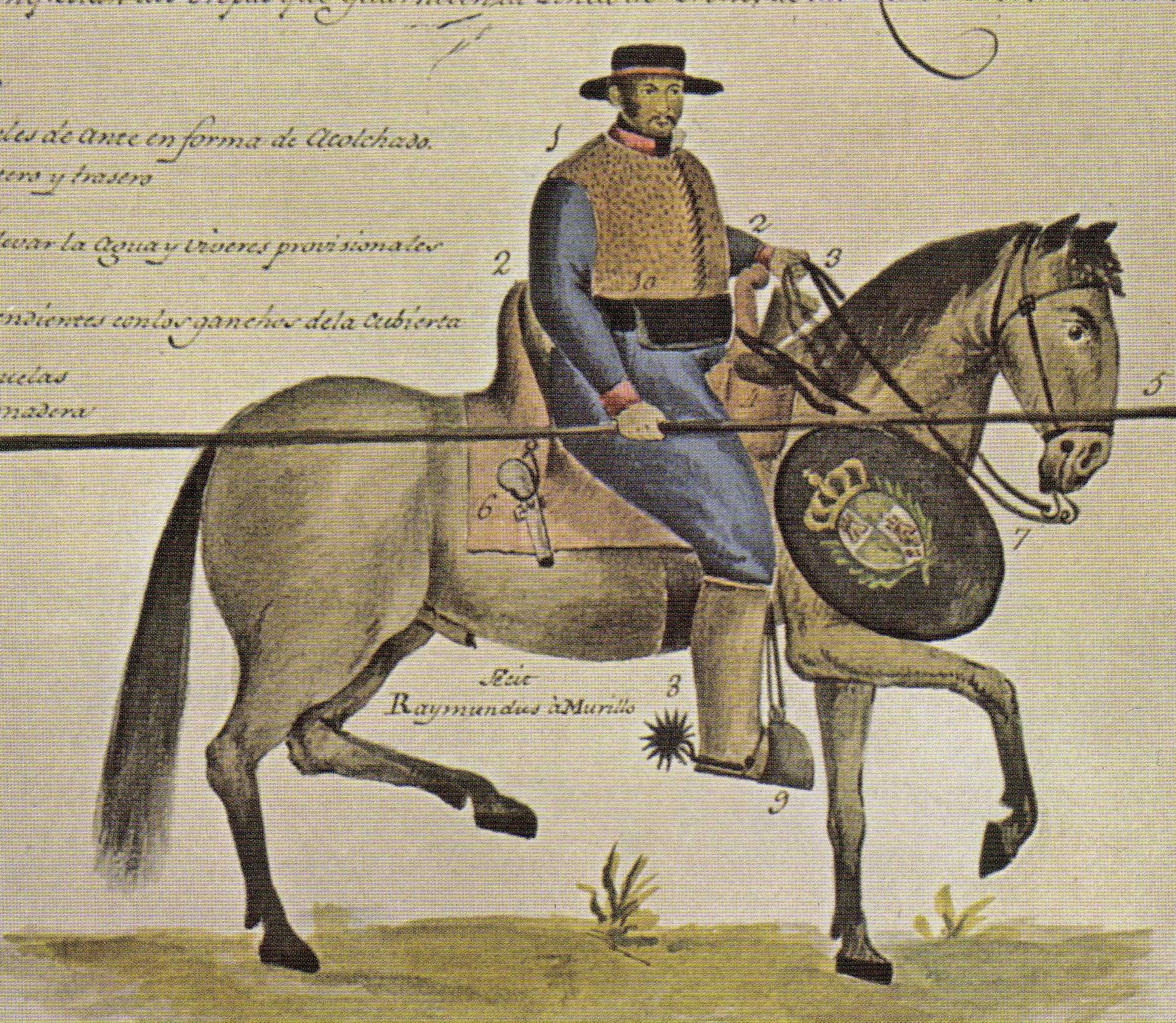
18th-century soldado de cuera in colonial Mexico

Various aspects of the Spanish equestrian tradition can be traced back to Islamic rule in Spain, including Moorish elements such as the use of Oriental-type horses, the la jineta riding style characterized by a shorter stirrup, solid-treed saddle and use of spurs, the heavy noseband or hackamore, (Arabic šakīma, Spanish jaquima) and other horse-related equipment and techniques. Certain aspects of the Arabic tradition, such as the hackamore, can in turn be traced to roots in ancient Persia.

During the 16th century, the Conquistadors and other Spanish settlers brought their cattle-raising traditions as well as both horses and domesticated cattle to the Americas, starting with their arrival in what today is Mexico and Florida. The traditions of Spain were transformed by the geographic, environmental and cultural circumstances of New Spain, which later became Mexico and the Southwestern United States. In turn, the land and people of the Americas also saw dramatic changes due to Spanish influence.

The arrival of horses was particularly significant, as equines had been extinct in the Americas since the end of the prehistoric ice age. Horses quickly multiplied in America and became crucial to the success of the Spanish and later settlers from other nations. The earliest horses were originally of Andalusian, Barb and Arabian ancestry, but a number of uniquely American horse breeds developed in North and South America through selective breeding and by natural selection of animals that escaped to the wild. The mustang and other colonial horse breeds are now called "wild", but in reality are feral horses—descendants of domesticated animals.

=== Vaqueros ===
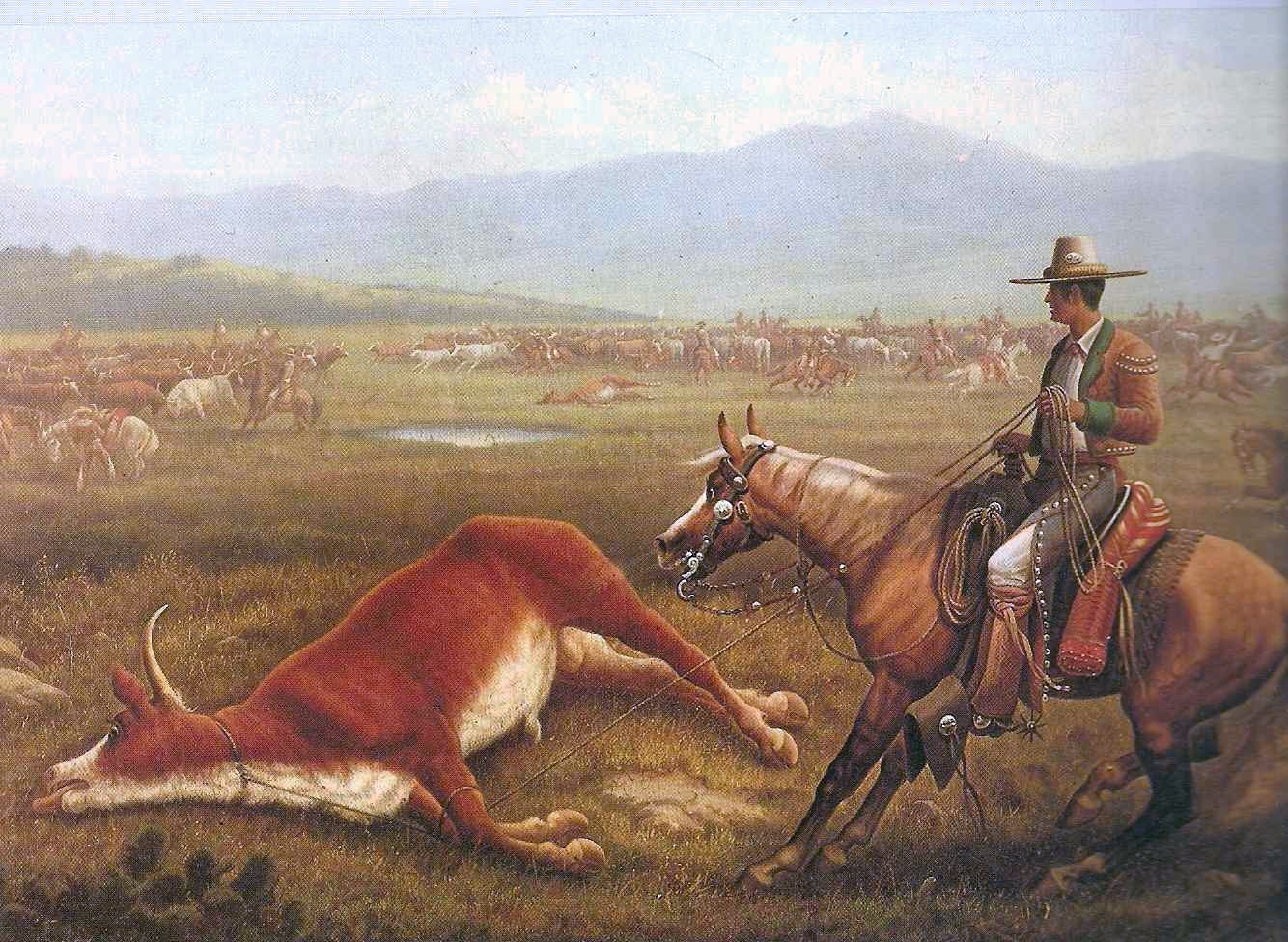
Vaqueros in California, circa 1830s

Though popularly considered American, the traditional cowboy began with the Spanish tradition, which evolved further in what today is Mexico and the Southwestern United States into the vaquero of northern Mexico and the charro of the Jalisco and Michoacán regions. While most hacendados (ranch owners) were ethnically Spanish criollos, many early vaqueros were Native Americans trained to work for the Spanish missions in caring for the mission herds. Vaqueros went north with livestock. In 1598, Don Juan de Oñate sent an expedition across the Rio Grande into New Mexico, bringing along 7000 head of cattle. From this beginning, vaqueros drove cattle from New Mexico and later Texas to Mexico City. Mexican traditions spread both South and North, influencing equestrian traditions from Argentina to Canada.

=== American development ===
As English-speaking traders and settlers expanded westward, English and Spanish traditions, language and culture merged to some degree. Before the Mexican–American War in 1848, New England merchants who traveled by ship to California encountered both hacendados and vaqueros, trading manufactured goods for the hides and tallow produced from vast cattle ranches. American traders along what later became known as the Santa Fe Trail had similar contacts with vaquero life. Starting with these early encounters, the lifestyle and language of the vaquero began a transformation which merged with English cultural traditions and produced what became known in American culture as the "cowboy".

The arrival of English-speaking settlers in Texas began in 1821. Rip Ford described the country between Laredo and Corpus Christi as inhabited by "countless droves of mustangs and ... wild cattle ... abandoned by Mexicans when they were ordered to evacuate the country between the Nueces and the Rio Grande by General Valentin Canalizo ... the horses and cattle abandoned invited the raids the Texians made upon this territory." California, on the other hand, did not see a large influx of settlers from the United States until after the Mexican–American War. In slightly different ways, both areas contributed to the evolution of the iconic American cowboy. Particularly with the arrival of railroads and an increased demand for beef in the wake of the American Civil War, older traditions combined with the need to drive cattle from the ranches where they were raised to the nearest railheads, often hundreds of miles away.

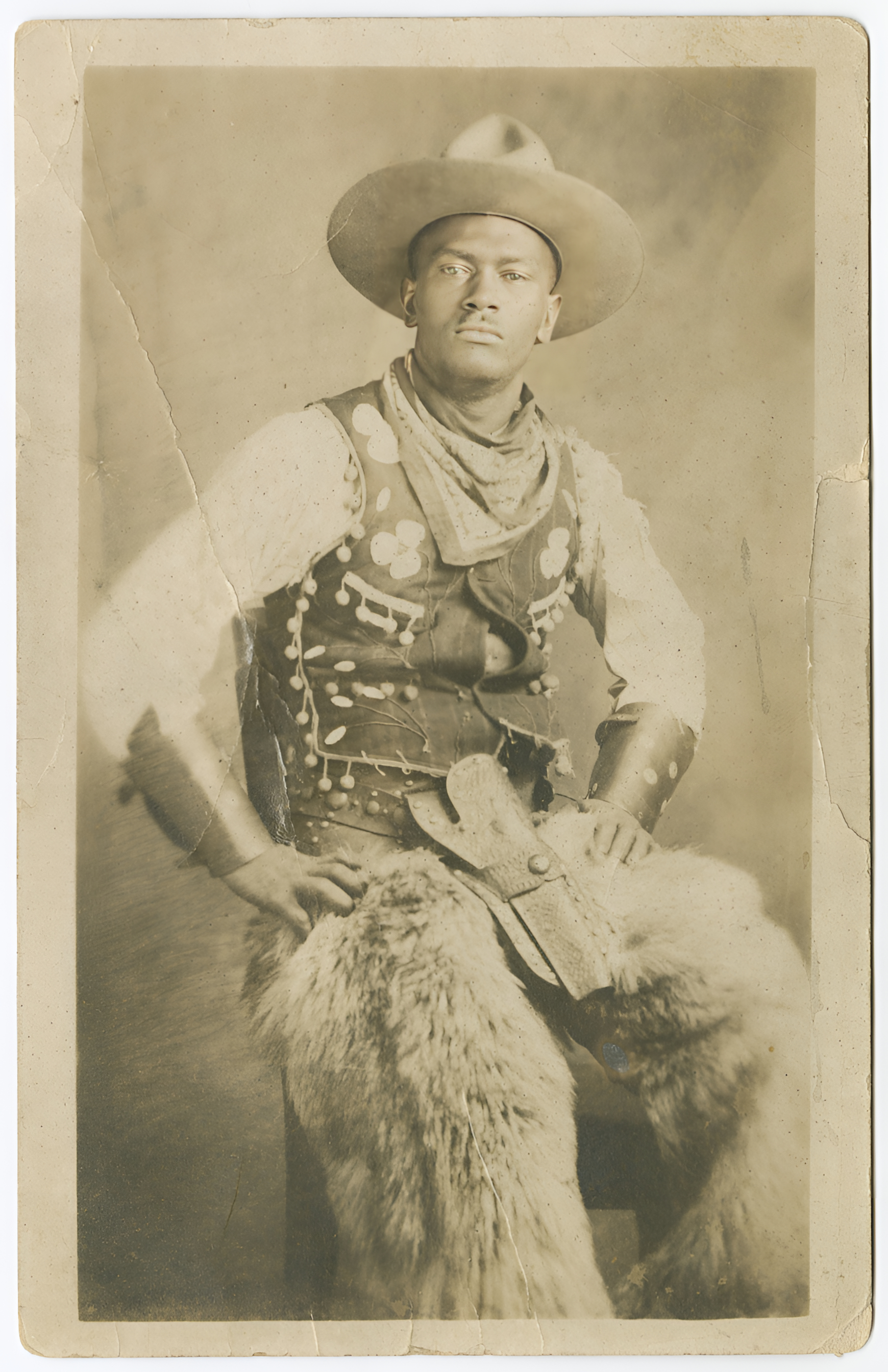
Postcard with a portrait of a Black cowboy from the early 1900s

Black cowboys in the American West accounted for up to 25 percent of workers in the range-cattle industry from the 1860s to 1880s, estimated to be between 6,000 and 9,000 workers. Typically former slaves or children of former slaves, many black men had skills in cattle handling and headed West at the end of the Civil War.

By the 1880s, the expansion of the cattle industry resulted in a need for additional open range. Thus many ranchers expanded into the northwest, where there were still large tracts of unsettled grassland. Texas cattle were herded north, into the Rocky Mountain west and the Dakotas. The cowboy adapted much of his gear to the colder conditions, and westward movement of the industry also led to intermingling of regional traditions from California to Texas, often with the cowboy taking the most useful elements of each.

Mustang-runners or Mesteñeros were cowboys and vaqueros who caught, broke and drove mustangs to market in Mexico, and later American territories of what is now Northern Mexico, Texas, New Mexico and California. They caught the mustangs that roamed the Great Plains and the San Joaquin Valley of California, and later in the Great Basin, from the 18th century to the early 20th century.

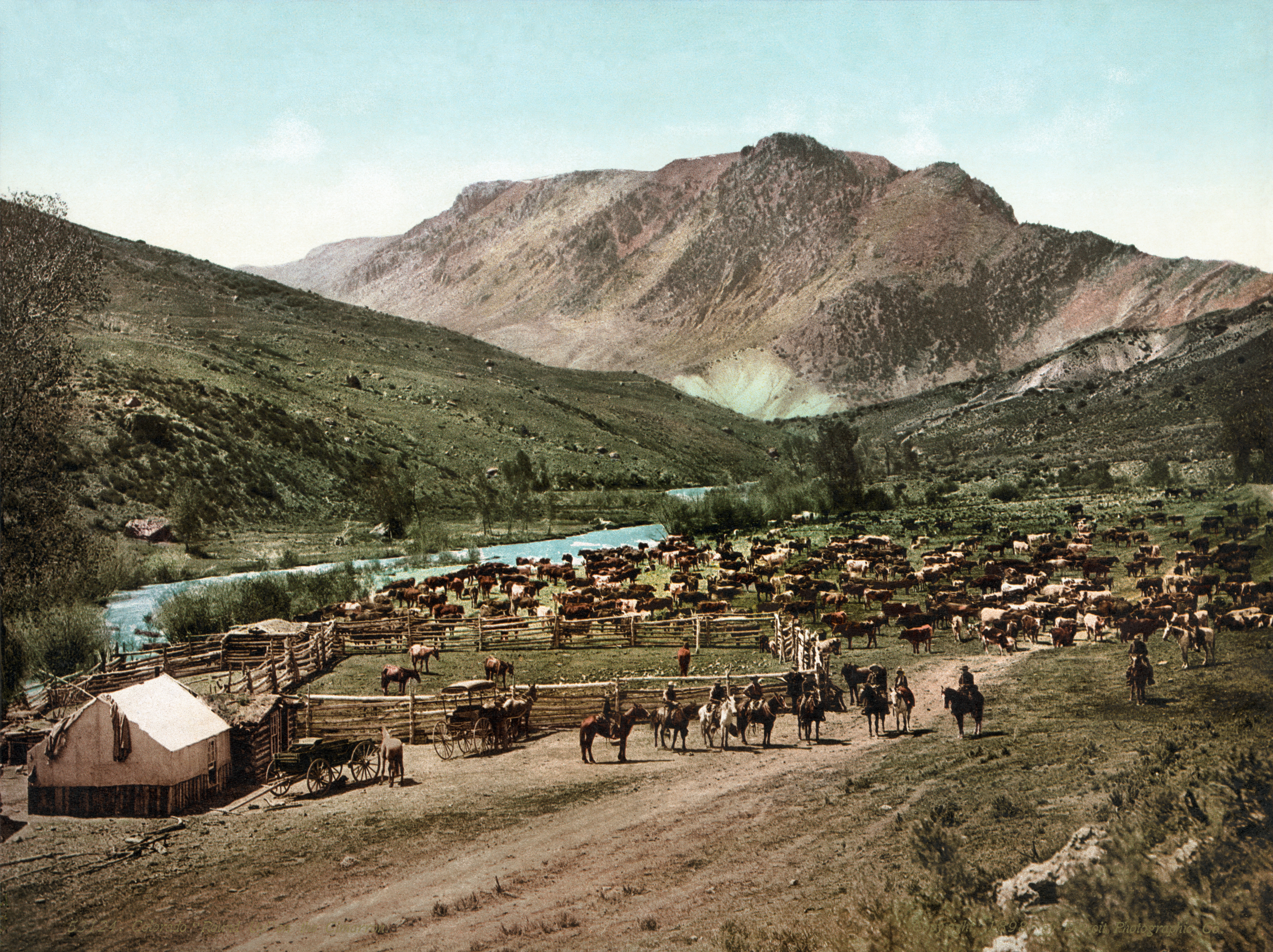
An 1898 photochrom of a round-up in Colorado

Large numbers of cattle lived in a semi-feral or a completely feral state on the open range and were left to graze, mostly untended, for much of the year. In many cases, different ranchers formed "associations" and grazed their cattle together on the same range. In order to determine the ownership of individual animals, they were marked with a distinctive brand, applied with a hot iron, usually while the cattle were still calves.

In order to find young calves for branding, and to sort out mature animals intended for sale, ranchers would hold a roundup, usually in the spring. A roundup required a number of specialized skills on the part of both cowboys and horses. Individuals who separated cattle from the herd required the highest level of skill and rode specially trained "cutting" horses, trained to follow the movements of cattle, capable of stopping and turning faster than other horses. Once cattle were sorted, most cowboys were required to rope young calves and restrain them to be branded and (in the case of most bull calves) castrated. Occasionally it was also necessary to restrain older cattle for branding or other treatment.

A large number of horses were needed for a roundup. Each cowboy would require three to four fresh horses in the course of a day's work. Horses themselves were also rounded up. It was common practice in the west for young foals to be born of tame mares, but allowed to grow up "wild" in a semi-feral state on the open range. There were also "wild" herds, often known as mustangs. Both types were rounded up, and the mature animals tamed, a process called horse breaking, or "bronco-busting", usually performed by cowboys who specialized as horse trainers. In some cases, extremely brutal methods were used to tame horses, and such animals tended to never be completely reliable. Other cowboys recognized their need to treat animals in a more humane fashion and modified their horse training methods, often re-learning techniques used by the vaqueros, particularly those of the Californio tradition. Horses trained in a gentler fashion were more reliable and useful for a wider variety of tasks.

Informal competition arose between cowboys seeking to test their cattle and horse-handling skills against one another, and thus, from the necessary tasks of the working cowboy, the sport of rodeo developed.

=== Cattle drives ===
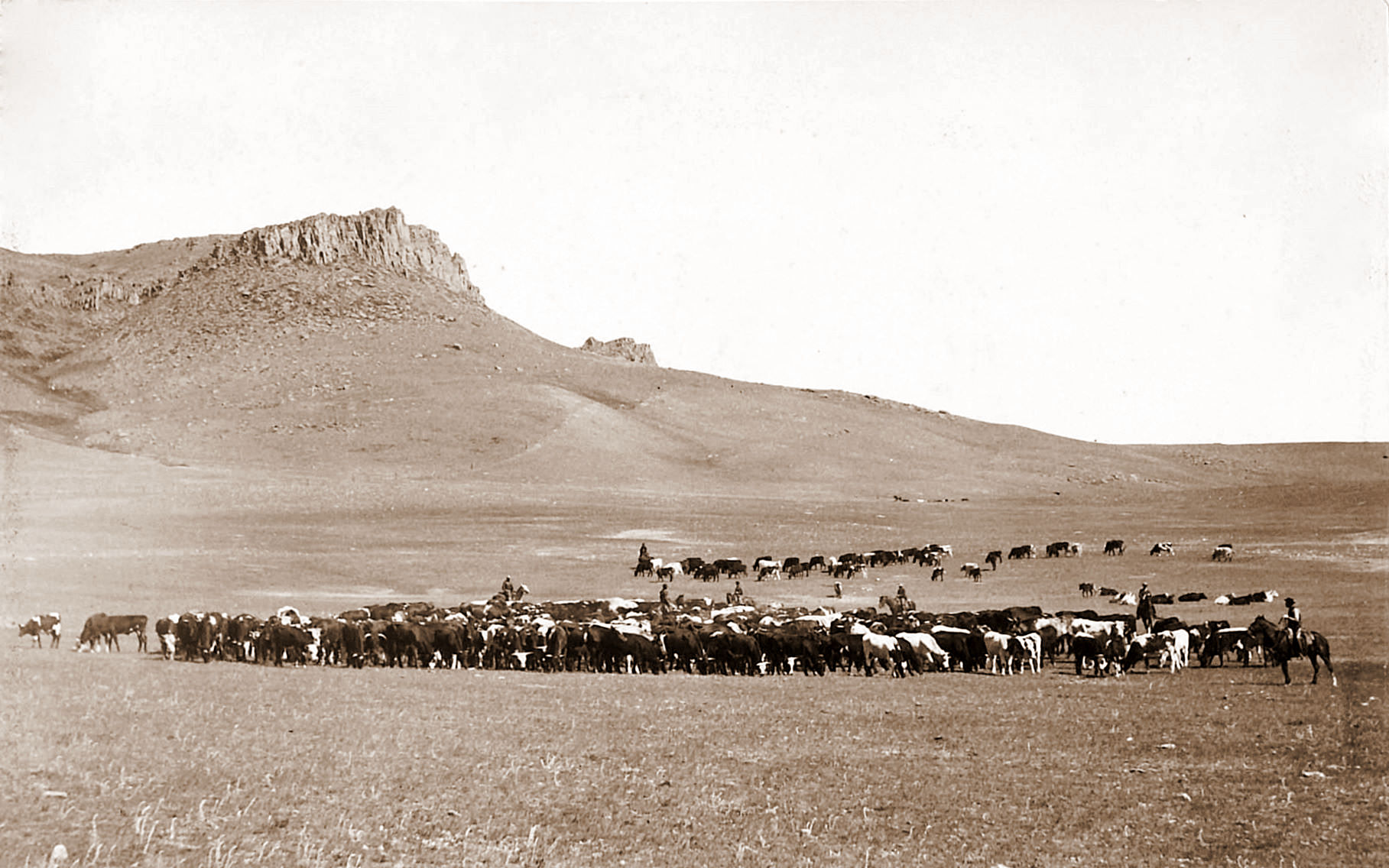
Cattle roundup near Great Falls, Montana, circa 1890

Prior to the mid-19th century, most ranchers primarily raised cattle for their own needs and to sell surplus meat and hides locally. There was also a limited market for hides, horns, hooves, and tallow in assorted manufacturing processes. While Texas contained vast herds of stray, free-ranging cattle available for free to anyone who could round them up, prior to 1865, there was little demand for beef. At the end of the American Civil War, Philip Danforth Armour opened a meat packing plant in Chicago, which became known as Armour and Company. With the expansion of the meat packing industry, the demand for beef increased significantly. By 1866, cattle could be sold to northern markets for as much as $40 per head, making it potentially profitable for cattle, particularly from Texas, to be herded long distances to market.

The first large-scale effort to drive cattle from Texas to the nearest railhead for shipment to Chicago occurred in 1866, when many Texas ranchers banded together to drive their cattle to the closest point that railroad tracks reached, which at that time was in Sedalia, Missouri. Farmers in eastern Kansas, afraid that Longhorns would transmit cattle fever to local animals as well as trample crops, formed groups that threatened to beat or shoot cattlemen found on their lands. Therefore, the 1866 drive failed to reach the railroad, and the cattle herds were sold for low prices. In 1867, a cattle shipping facility was built west of farm country around the railhead at Abilene, Kansas, and became a center of cattle shipping, loading over 36,000 head of cattle that year. The route from Texas to Abilene became known as the Chisholm Trail, after Jesse Chisholm, who marked out the route. It ran through present-day Oklahoma, which then was Indian Territory. Later, other trails forked off to different railheads, including those at Dodge City and Wichita, Kansas. By 1877, the largest of the cattle-shipping boom towns, Dodge City, Kansas, shipped out 500,000 head of cattle.

Cattle drives had to strike a balance between speed and the weight of the cattle. While cattle could be driven as far as 25 miles (40 km) in a single day, they would lose so much weight that they would be hard to sell when they reached the end of the trail. Usually they were taken shorter distances each day, allowed periods to rest and graze both at midday and at night. On average, a herd could maintain a healthy weight moving about 15 miles (25 km) per day. Such a pace meant that it would take as long as two months to travel from a home ranch to a railhead. The Chisholm trail, for example, was 1,000 miles (1,600 km) miles long.

On average, a single herd of cattle on a drive numbered about 3,000 head. To herd the cattle, a crew of at least 10 cowboys was needed, with three horses per cowboy. Cowboys worked in shifts to watch the cattle 24 hours a day, herding them in the proper direction in the daytime and watching them at night to prevent stampedes and deter theft. The crew also included a cook, who drove a chuck wagon, usually pulled by oxen, and a horse wrangler to take charge of the remuda, or herd of spare horses. The wrangler on a cattle drive was often a very young cowboy or one of lower social status, but the cook was a particularly well-respected member of the crew, as not only was he in charge of the food, he also was in charge of medical supplies and had a working knowledge of practical medicine.

=== End of the open range ===
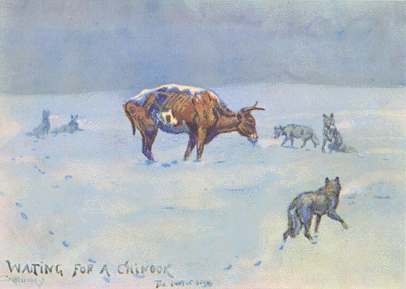
Waiting for a Chinook, by C.M. Russell. Overgrazing and harsh winters were factors that brought an end to the age of the open range.

Barbed wire, an innovation of the 1880s, allowed cattle to be confined to designated areas to prevent overgrazing of the range. In Texas and surrounding areas, increased population required ranchers to fence off their individual lands. In the north, overgrazing stressed the open range, leading to insufficient winter forage for the cattle and starvation, particularly during the harsh winter of 1886–1887, when hundreds of thousands of cattle died across the Northwest, leading to collapse of the cattle industry. By the 1890s, barbed-wire fencing was also standard in the northern plains, railroads had expanded to cover most of the nation, and meat packing plants were built closer to major ranching areas, making long cattle drives from Texas to the railheads in Kansas unnecessary. Hence, the age of the open range was gone and large cattle drives were over. Smaller cattle drives continued at least into the 1940s, as ranchers, prior to the development of the modern cattle truck, still needed to herd cattle to local railheads for transport to stockyards and packing plants. Meanwhile, ranches multiplied all over the developing West, keeping cowboy employment high, if still low-paid, but also somewhat more settled.

== Culture ==
=== Ethnicity ===
Southern Cheyenne and Arapaho youths learning to brand cattle at the Seger Indian School, Oklahoma Territory, ca. 1900

American cowboys were drawn from multiple sources. By the late 1860s, following the American Civil War and the expansion of the cattle industry, former soldiers from both the Union and Confederacy came west, seeking work, as did large numbers of restless white men in general. A significant number of African-American freedmen also were drawn to cowboy life, in part because there was not quite as much racial discrimination in the West as in other areas of American society at the time. A significant number of Mexicans and American Indians already living in the region also worked as cowboys. Later, particularly after 1890, when American policy promoted "assimilation" of Indian people, some Indian boarding schools also taught ranching skills. Today, some Native Americans in the western United States own cattle and small ranches, and many are still employed as cowboys, especially on ranches located near Indian reservations. The "Indian Cowboy" is also part of the rodeo circuit.

Because cowboys ranked low in the social structure of the period, there are no firm figures on the actual proportion of various races. One writer states that cowboys were "of two classes—those recruited from Texas and other States on the eastern slope; and Mexicans, from the south-western region". Census records suggest that about 15% of all cowboys were of African-American ancestry—ranging from about 25% on the trail drives out of Texas, to very few in the northwest. Similarly, cowboys of Mexican descent also averaged about 15% of the total, but were more common in Texas and the southwest. Some estimates suggest that in the late 19th century, one out of every three cowboys was a Mexican vaquero, and 20% may have been African-American. Other estimates place the number of African-American cowboys as high as 25 percent.

Regardless of ethnicity, most cowboys came from lower social classes and the pay was poor. The average cowboy earned approximately a dollar a day, plus food, and, when near the home ranch, a bed in the bunkhouse, usually a barracks-like building with a single open room.

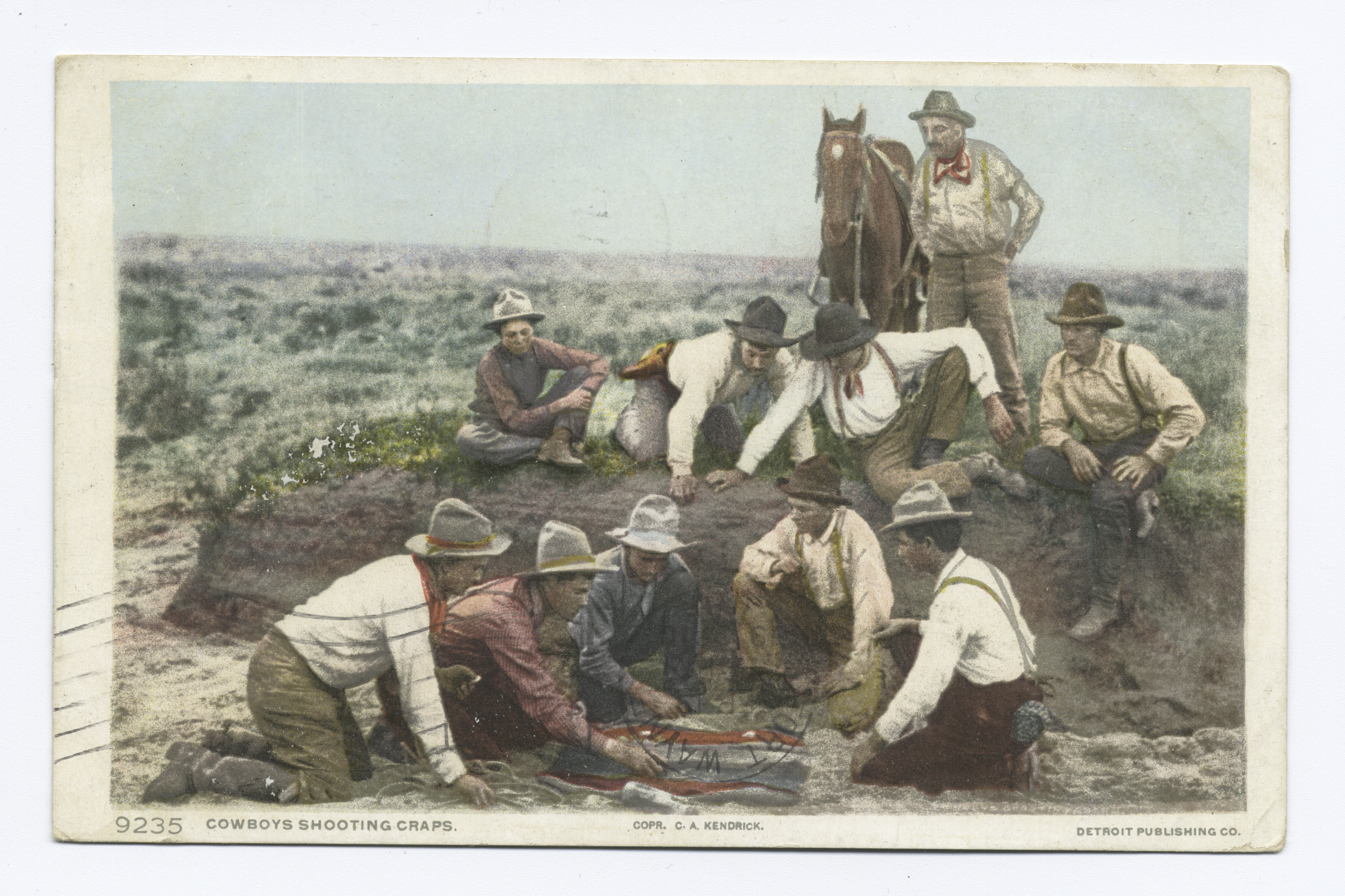
Cowboys playing a craps game

=== Social world ===
Over time, the cowboys of the American West developed a personal culture of their own, a blend of frontier and Victorian values that even retained vestiges of chivalry. Such hazardous work in isolated conditions also bred a tradition of self-dependence and individualism, with great value put on personal honesty, exemplified in songs and poetry. The cowboy often worked in an all-male environment, particularly on cattle drives, and in the frontier west, men often significantly outnumbered women.

Some men were attracted to the frontier by other men. At times, in a region where men outnumbered women, even social events normally attended by both sexes were at times all male, and men could be found partnering up with one another for dances. Homosexual acts between young, unmarried men occurred, but cowboys culture itself was and remains deeply homophobic. Though anti-sodomy laws were common in the Old West, they often were only selectively enforced.

=== Popular image ===
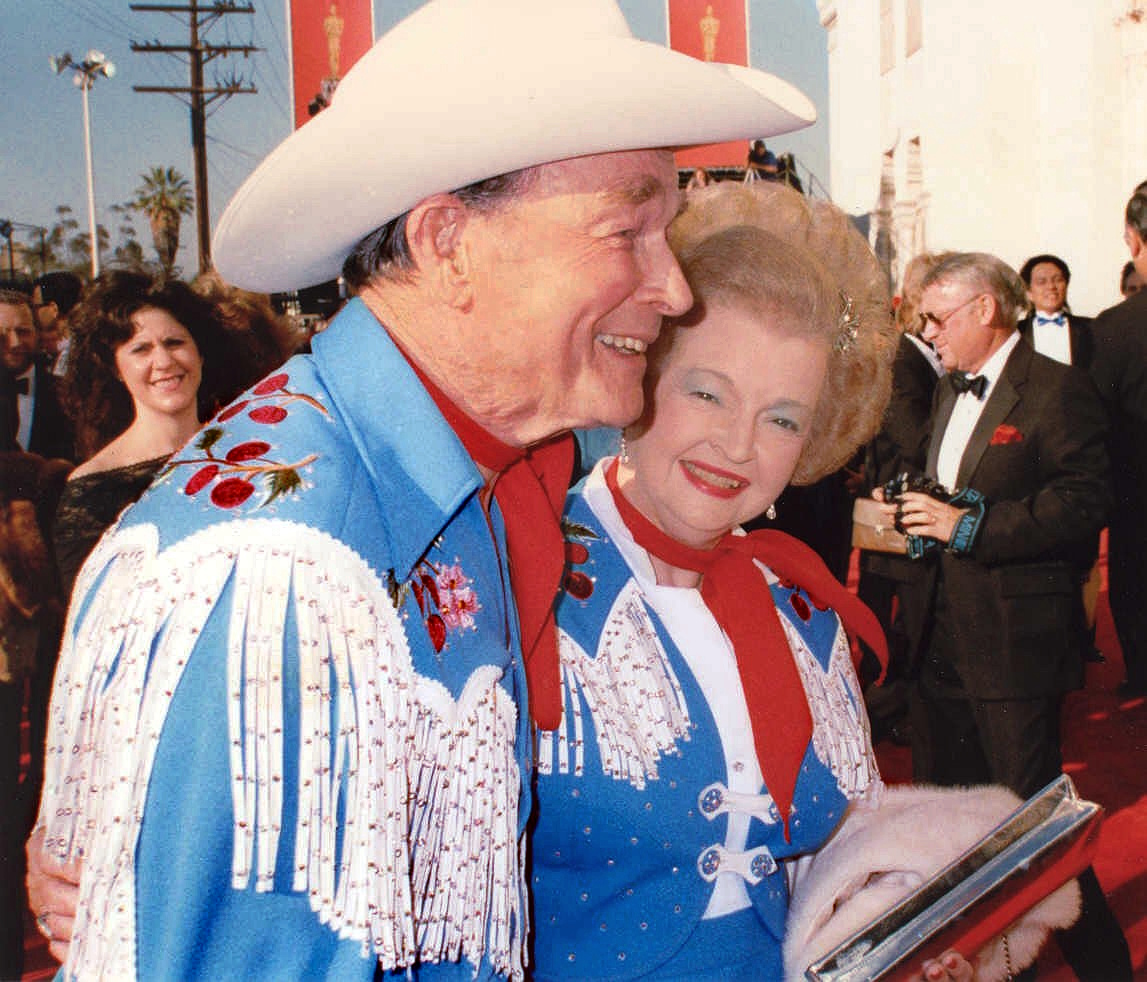
Roy Rogers and Dale Evans at the 61st Academy Awards in 1989

Heather Cox Richardson argues for a political dimension to the original cowboy image in the 1870s and 1880s:

The timing of the cattle industry's growth meant that cowboy imagery grew to have extraordinary power. Entangled in the vicious politics of the postwar years, Democrats, especially those in the old Confederacy, imagined the West as a land untouched by Republican politicians they hated. They developed an image of the cowboys as men who worked hard, played hard, lived by a code of honor, protected themselves, and asked nothing of the government. In the hands of Democratic newspaper editors, the realities of cowboy life -- the poverty, the danger, the debilitating hours -- became romantic. Cowboys embodied virtues Democrats believed Republicans were destroying by creating a behemoth government catering to lazy ex-slaves. By the 1860s, cattle drives were a feature of the plains landscape, and Democrats had made cowboys a symbol of rugged individual independence, something they insisted Republicans were destroying.

The traditions of the working cowboy were further etched into the minds of the general public with the development of Wild West shows in the late 19th and early 20th centuries, which showcased and romanticized the life of both cowboys and Native Americans. Beginning in the 1920s and continuing to the present day, Western films popularized the cowboy lifestyle but also formed persistent stereotypes. In some cases, the cowboy and the violent gunslinger are often associated with one another. On the other hand, some actors who portrayed cowboys promoted other values, such as the "cowboy code" of Gene Autry, that encouraged honorable behavior, respect and patriotism. Historian Robert K. DeArment draws a connection between the popularized Western code and the stereotypical rowdy cowboy image to that of the "subculture of violence" of drovers in Old West Texas that was influenced itself by the Southern code duello.

Likewise, cowboys in movies were often shown fighting with American Indians. Most armed conflicts occurred between Native people and cavalry units of the U.S. Army. Relations between cowboys and Native Americans were varied but were generally unfriendly. Native people usually allowed cattle herds to pass through for a toll of ten cents a head but raided cattle drives and ranches in times of active white-Native conflict or food shortages. In the 1860s, for example, the Comanche created problems in Western Texas. Other examples of conflict between cowboys and Native people include the Fort Elliott incident, Godfrey Ranch raid, Pinhook Draw fight, and the Pecos War. Cowboys were armed against both predators and human thieves, and often used their guns to drive away people of any race who attempted to rustle cattle.

In reality, working ranch hands past and present had very little time for anything other than the constant hard work involved in maintaining a ranch.

== Cowgirls ==
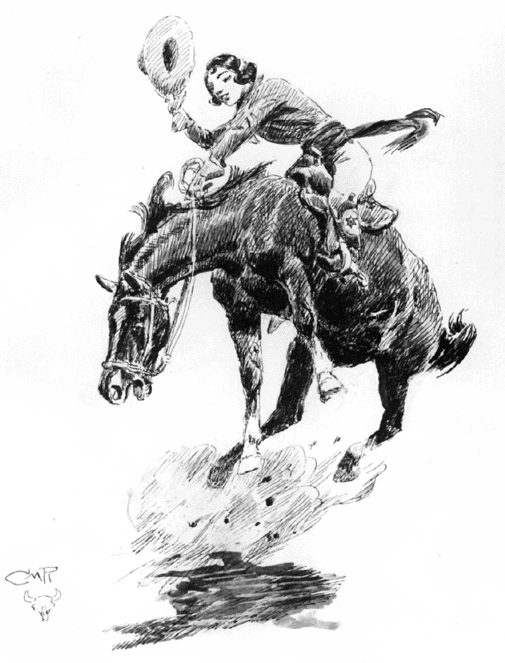
Rodeo Cowgirl by C.M. Russell

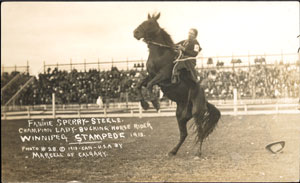
Fannie Sperry Steele, Champion lady bucking horse rider, Winnipeg Stampede, 1913

The history of women in the West, and women who worked on cattle ranches in particular, is not as well documented as is that of men. Institutions such as the National Cowgirl Museum and Hall of Fame in modern years have attempted to gather and document the contributions of women.

There are few records mentioning girls or women working to drive cattle up the cattle trails of the Old West. Women performed considerable ranch work, and in some cases (especially when the men went to war or on embarked on long cattle drives) ran them. There is little doubt that women, particularly the wives and daughters of men who owned small ranches and could not afford to hire large numbers of outside laborers, worked side-by-side with men and thus needed to ride horses and perform related tasks. The largely undocumented contributions of women to the West were acknowledged in law; the Western states led the United States in granting women the right to vote, beginning with Wyoming in 1869. Early photographers such as Evelyn Cameron documented the life of working ranch women during the late 19th and early 20th centuries.

While impractical for everyday work, the sidesaddle was a tool that afforded women the ability to ride horses in public settings instead of being left on foot or confined to horse-drawn vehicles. Following the Civil War, Charles Goodnight modified the traditional English sidesaddle, creating a western-styled design. The traditional charras of Mexico preserve a similar tradition and ride sidesaddles today in charreada exhibitions on both sides of the border.

It was not until the advent of Wild West shows that "cowgirls" came into their own. These adult women were skilled performers, demonstrating riding, expert marksmanship and trick roping that entertained audiences around the world. Women such as Annie Oakley became household names. By 1900, skirts split for riding astride became popular and allowed women to compete with men without scandalizing Victorian-era audiences by wearing men's clothing or bloomers. In the films that followed beginning in the early 20th century, the role of the cowgirl was expanded in popular culture and film set designers developed attractive clothing suitable for riding Western saddles.

Independently of the entertainment industry, the growth of rodeo brought about the rodeo cowgirl. In the early Wild West shows and rodeos, women competed in all events, sometimes against other women, sometimes with the men. Cowgirls such as Fannie Sperry Steele rode the same "rough stock" and assumed the same risks as the men (and all while wearing a heavy split skirt that was more encumbering than men's trousers) and competed at major rodeos such as the Calgary Stampede and Cheyenne Frontier Days.

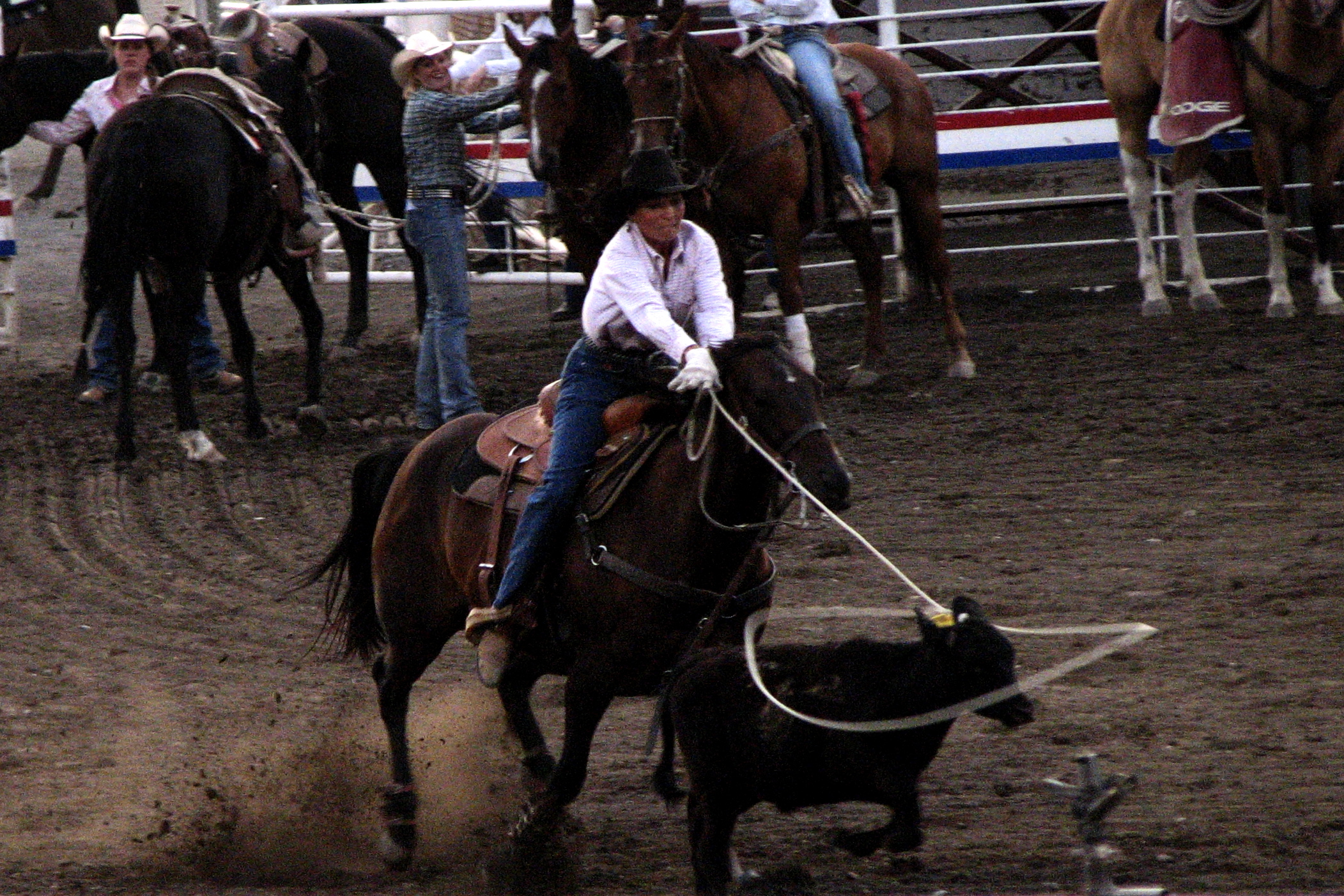
Modern rodeo cowgirl

Rodeo competition for women changed in the 1920s as the result of several factors. After 1925, when Eastern promoters started staging indoor rodeos in places like Madison Square Garden, women were generally excluded from the men's events and many of the women's events were dropped. Also, many in the public had difficulties with seeing women seriously injured or killed, and in particular, the death of Bonnie McCarroll at the 1929 Pendleton Round-Up led to the elimination of women's bronc riding from rodeo competition.

In today's rodeos, men and women compete equally together only in the event of team roping, although women could now enter other open events. In all-women rodeos, women compete in bronc riding, bull riding and all other traditional rodeo events. In open rodeos, cowgirls primarily compete in the timed riding events such as barrel racing, and most professional rodeos do not offer as many women's events as they do men's events.

Boys and girls are more apt to compete against one another in all events in high-school rodeos as well as O-Mok-See competition, where boys can be seen in events traditionally associated with women riders, such as barrel racing. Outside of the rodeo world, women compete equally with men in nearly all other equestrian events, including the Olympics, and Western riding events such as cutting, reining and endurance riding.

Today's working cowgirls generally use clothing, tools and equipment indistinguishable from those of men, other than in color and design, usually preferring a flashier look in competition. Sidesaddles are only seen in exhibitions and a limited number of specialty horse-show classes. A modern working cowgirl wears jeans, close-fitting shirts, boots, hat and when needed, chaps and gloves. If working on the ranch, they perform the same chores as cowboys and dress to suit the situation.

== Regional traditions ==
Geography, climate and cultural traditions caused differences to develop in cattle-handling methods and equipment from one part of the United States to another. The period between 1840 and 1870 marked a mingling of cultures when English and French-descended people began to settle west of the Mississippi River and encountered the Spanish-descended people who had settled in the parts of Mexico that later became Texas and California. In the modern world, remnants of two major and distinct cowboy traditions remain, known today as the "Texas" tradition and the "Spanish", "Vaquero", or "California" tradition. Less well-known but equally distinct traditions also developed in Hawaii and Florida. Today, the various regional cowboy traditions have merged to some extent, though a few regional differences in equipment and riding style still remain, and some individuals choose to deliberately preserve the more time-consuming but highly skilled techniques of the pure vaquero or "buckaroo" tradition. The popular "horse whisperer" style of natural horsemanship was originally developed by practitioners who were predominantly from California and the Northwestern states, clearly combining the attitudes and philosophy of the California vaquero with the equipment and outward look of the Texas cowboy.

=== California and Pacific region ===
The vaquero, the Spanish or Mexican cowboy who worked with young, untrained horses, arrived in the 18th century and flourished in Alta California and bordering territories during the Spanish Colonial period. Settlers from the United States did not enter California in significant numbers until after the Mexican–American War, and most early settlers were miners rather than livestock ranchers, leaving livestock-raising largely to the Spanish and Mexican people who chose to remain in California. The California vaquero or buckaroo, unlike the Texas cowboy, was considered a highly skilled worker, who usually stayed on the same ranch where he was born or had grown up and raised his own family there. In addition, the geography and climate of much of California was dramatically different from that of Texas, allowing more intensive grazing with less open range, plus cattle in California were marketed primarily at a regional level, without the need (nor, until much later, even the logistical possibility) to be driven hundreds of miles to railroad lines. Thus, a horse- and livestock-handling culture remained in California and the Pacific Northwest that retained a stronger direct Spanish influence than that of Texas. The modern distinction between vaquero and buckaroo within American English may also reflect the parallel differences between the California and Texas traditions of western horsemanship.

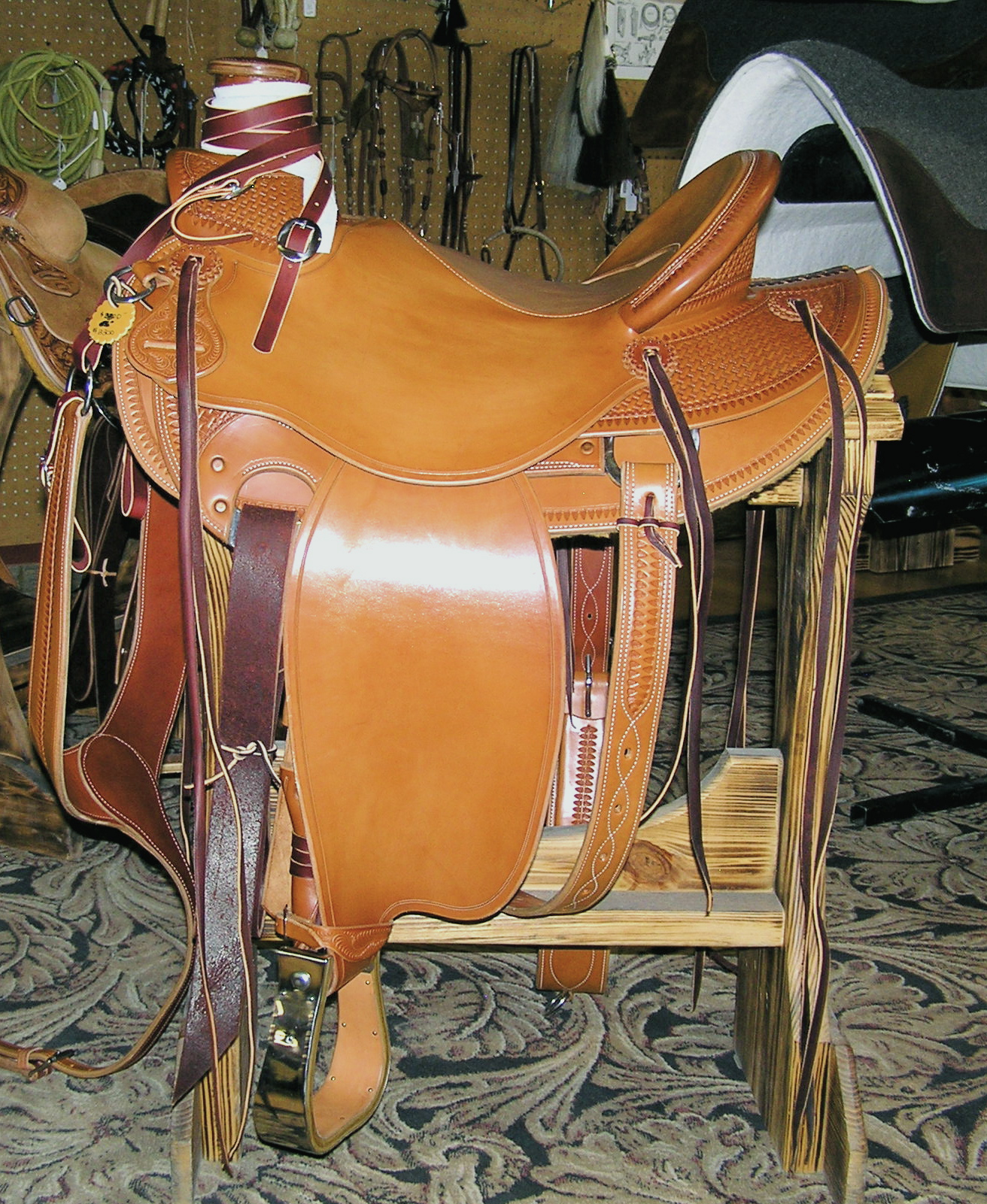
A "Wade" saddle, popular with working ranch Buckaroo tradition riders, derived from vaquero saddle designs

==== Buckaroos ====
Some cowboys of the California tradition were dubbed buckaroos by English-speaking settlers. The words "buckaroo" and vaquero are still used on occasion in the Great Basin, parts of California and, less often, in the Pacific Northwest. Elsewhere, the term "cowboy" is more common.

The word buckaroo is generally believed to be an anglicized version of vaquero and shows phonological characteristics compatible with that origin. Buckaroo first appeared in American English in 1827. The word may also have developed with influences from the English word "buck" or bucking, the behavior of young, untrained horses. In 1960, one etymologist suggested that buckaroo derives, through Gullah: buckra, from the Ibibio and Efik: mbakara, meaning "white man, master, boss". Although that derivation was later rejected, another possibility advanced was that "buckaroo" was a pun on vaquero, blending both Spanish and African sources.

=== Texas tradition ===
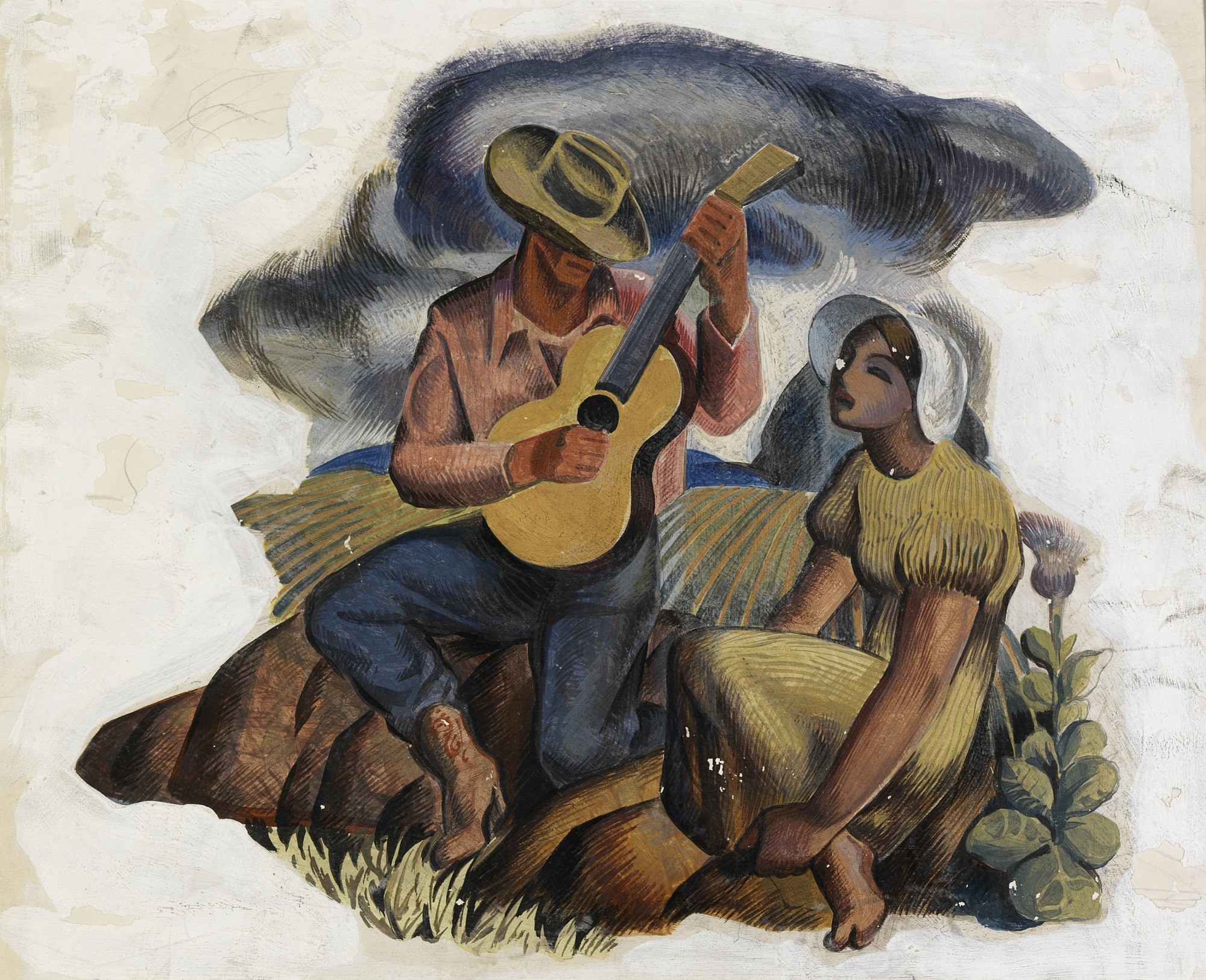
“Music of the Plains”, by Xavier Gonzalez. This New Deal-era artwork features a cowboy of Mexican heritage serenading a woman

In the 18th century, people in Spanish Texas began to herd cattle on horseback to sell in Louisiana, both legally and illegally. By the early 19th century, the Spanish Crown, and later, independent Mexico, offered empresario grants in what would later be Texas to non-citizens, such as settlers from the United States. In 1821, Stephen F. Austin led a group which became the first English-speaking Mexican citizens. Following Texas independence in 1836, even more Americans immigrated into the empresario ranching areas of Texas. Here the settlers were strongly influenced by the Mexican vaquero culture, borrowing vocabulary and attire from their counterparts, but also retaining some of the livestock-handling traditions and culture of the Eastern United States and Great Britain. The Texas cowboy was typically a bachelor who hired on with different outfits from season to season.

Following the American Civil War, vaquero culture combined with the cattle herding and drover traditions of the southeastern United States that evolved as settlers moved west. Additional influences developed out of Texas as cattle trails were created to meet up with the railroad lines of Kansas and Nebraska, in addition to expanding ranching opportunities in the Great Plains and Rocky Mountain Front, east of the Continental Divide. The new settlers required more horses, to be trained faster, and brought a bigger and heavier horse with them. This led to modifications in the bridling and bitting traditions used by the vaquero. Thus, the Texas cowboy tradition arose from a combination of cultural influences, in addition to the need for adaptation to the geography and climate of west Texas and the need to conduct long cattle drives to get animals to market.

Historian Terry Jordan proposed in 1982 that some Texan traditions that developed—particularly after the Civil War—may trace to colonial South Carolina, as most settlers to Texas were from the southeastern United States. These theories have been questioned by some reviewers. In a subsequent work, Jordan also noted that the influence of post-War Texas upon the whole of the frontier Western cowboy tradition was likely much less than previously thought.

=== Florida ===
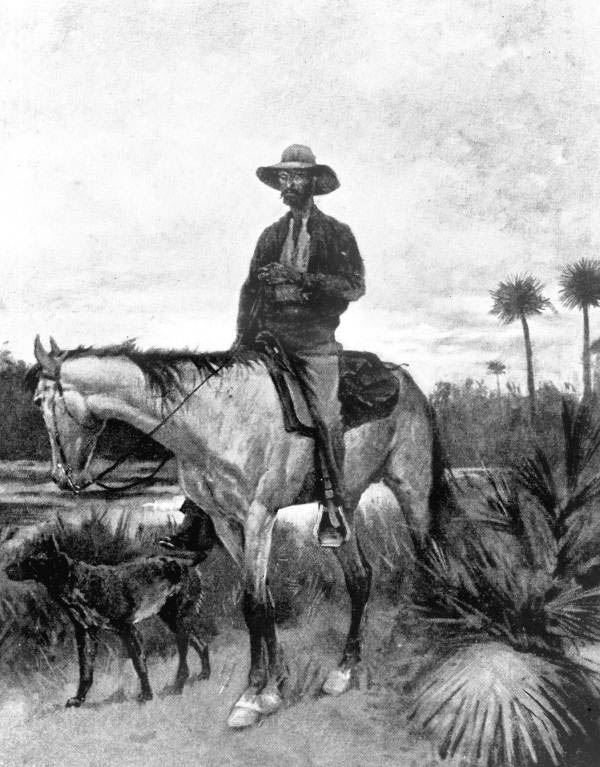
A Cracker Cowboy by Frederic Remington

The Florida "cowhunter" or "cracker cowboy" of the 19th and early 20th centuries was distinct from the Texas and California traditions. Florida cowboys did not use lassos to herd or capture cattle. Their primary tools were bullwhips and dogs. Since the Florida cowhunter did not need a saddle horn for anchoring a lariat, many did not use Western saddles, instead using a McClellan saddle. While some individuals wore boots that reached above the knees for protection from snakes, others wore brogans. They usually wore inexpensive wool or straw hats, and used ponchos for protection from rain.

Cattle and horses were introduced into Spanish Florida in the 16th century, and flourished throughout the 17th century. The cattle introduced by the Spanish persist today in two rare breeds: Florida Cracker cattle and Pineywoods cattle. The Florida Cracker Horse, which is still used by some Florida cowboys, is descended from horses introduced by the Spanish. From shortly after 1565 until the end of the 17th century, cattle ranches owned by Spanish officials and missions operated in northern Florida to supply the Spanish garrison in St. Augustine and markets in Cuba. Raids into Spanish Florida by the Province of Carolina and its Native American allies, which wiped out the native population of Florida, led to the collapse of the Spanish mission and ranching systems.

In the 18th century, Creek, Seminole, and other Indian people moved into the depopulated areas of Florida and started herding the cattle left from the Spanish ranches. In the 19th century, most tribes in the area were dispossessed of their land and cattle and pushed south or west by white settlers and the United States government. By the middle of the 19th century, white ranchers were running large herds of cattle on the extensive open range of central and southern Florida. The hides and meat from Florida cattle became such a critical supply item for the Confederacy during the American Civil War that a unit of Cow Cavalry was organized to round up and protect the herds from Union raiders. After the Civil War, and into the 20th Century, Florida cattle were periodically driven to ports on the Gulf of Mexico, such as Punta Rassa near Fort Myers, Florida, and shipped to market in Cuba.

The Florida cowhunter or cracker cowboy tradition gradually assimilated to western cowboy tradition during the 20th century. Texas tick fever and the screw-worm were introduced to Florida in the early 20th century by cattle entering from other states. These pests forced Florida cattlemen to separate individual animals from their herds at frequent intervals for treatment, which eventually led to the widespread use of lassos. Florida cowboys continue to use dogs and bullwhips for controlling cattle.

=== Hawai'i ===
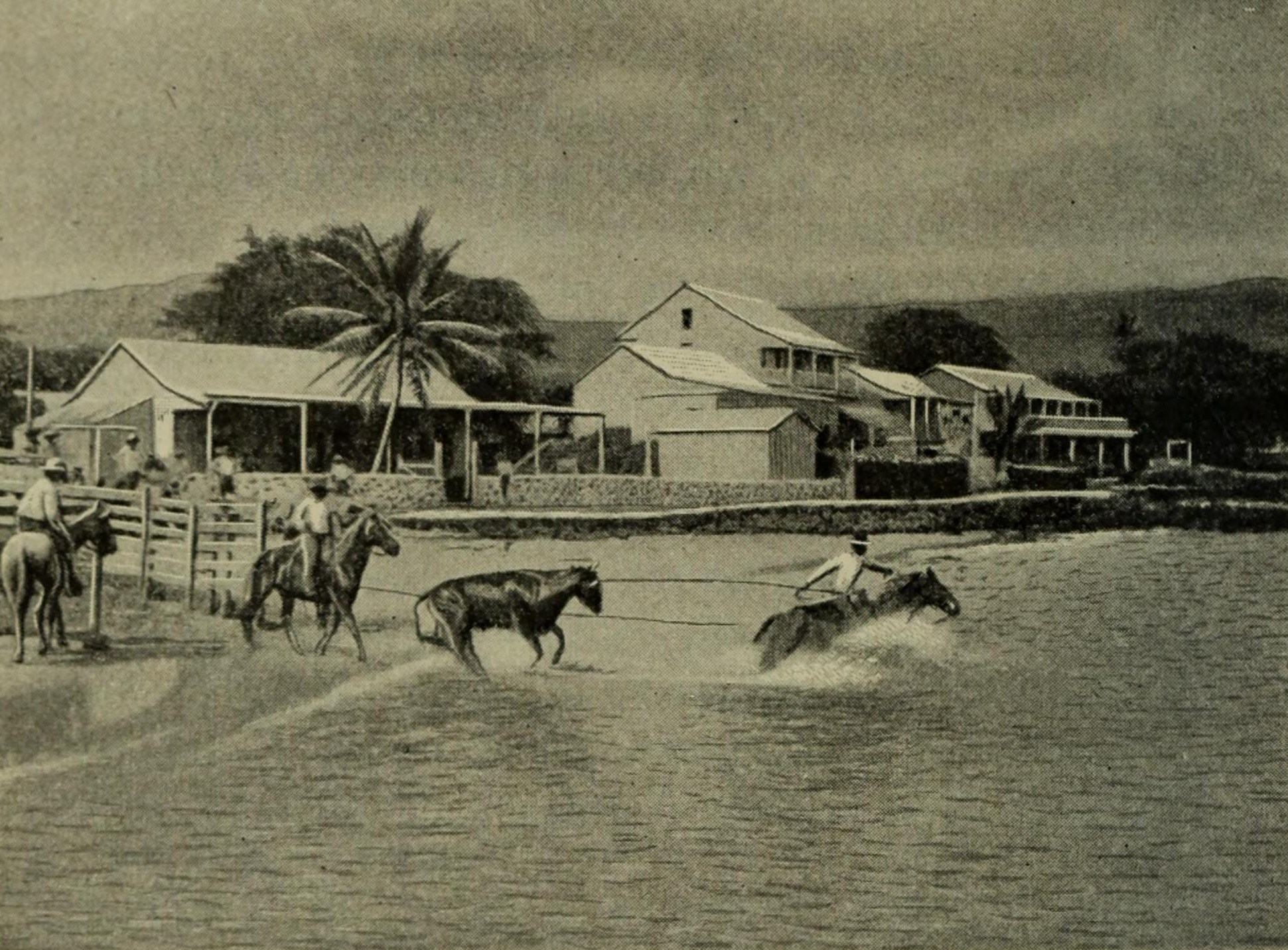
Loading cattle at Kailua-Kona, at the start of the 20th century

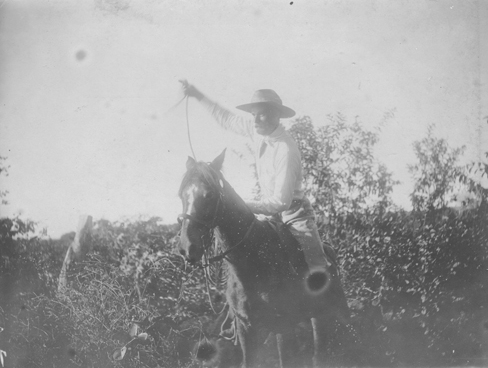
Photograph of Hawaiian Paniolo

The Hawaiian cowboy, the paniolo, is also a direct descendant of the vaquero of California and Mexico. Experts in Hawaiian etymology believe "Paniolo" is a Hawaiianized pronunciation of español. (The Hawaiian language has no /s/ sound, and all syllables and words must end in a vowel.) Paniolo, like cowboys on the mainland of North America, learned their skills from Mexican vaqueros. Other theories of word origin suggest Paniolo was derived from pañuelo (Spanish for handkerchief) or possibly from a Hawai'ian language word meaning "hold firmly and sway gracefully".

Captain George Vancouver brought cattle and sheep in 1793 as a gift to Kamehameha I, monarch of the Hawaiian Kingdom. For ten years, Kamehameha forbade killing of cattle, and imposed the death penalty on anyone who violated his edict. As a result, numbers multiplied astonishingly, and were wreaking havoc throughout the countryside. By the reign of Kamehameha III the number of wild cattle were becoming a problem, so in 1832 he sent an emissary to California, then still a part of Mexico. He was impressed with the skill of the vaqueros, and invited three to Hawai'i to teach the Hawaiian people how to work cattle.

The first horses arrived in Hawai'i in 1803. By 1837, John Parker, a sailor from New England who settled in the islands, received permission from Kamehameha III to lease royal land near Mauna Kea, where he built a ranch.

The Hawaiian style of ranching originally included capturing wild cattle by driving them into pits dug in the forest floor. Once tamed somewhat by hunger and thirst, they were hauled out up a steep ramp, and tied by their horns to the horns of a tame, older steer (or ox) that knew where the paddock with food and water was located. The industry grew slowly under the reign of Kamehameha's son Liholiho (Kamehameha II).

Even today, traditional paniolo dress, as well as certain styles of Hawaiian formal attire, reflect the Spanish heritage of the vaquero. The traditional Hawaiian saddle, the noho lio, and many other tools of the cowboy's trade have a distinctly Mexican/Spanish look and many Hawaiian ranching families still carry the names of the vaqueros who married Hawaiian women and made Hawai'i their home.

=== Virginia ===
On the Eastern Shore of Virginia, the "Salt Water Cowboys" are known for rounding up the feral Chincoteague Ponies from Assateague Island and driving them across Assateague Channel into pens on Chincoteague Island during the annual Pony Penning.

== Canada ==
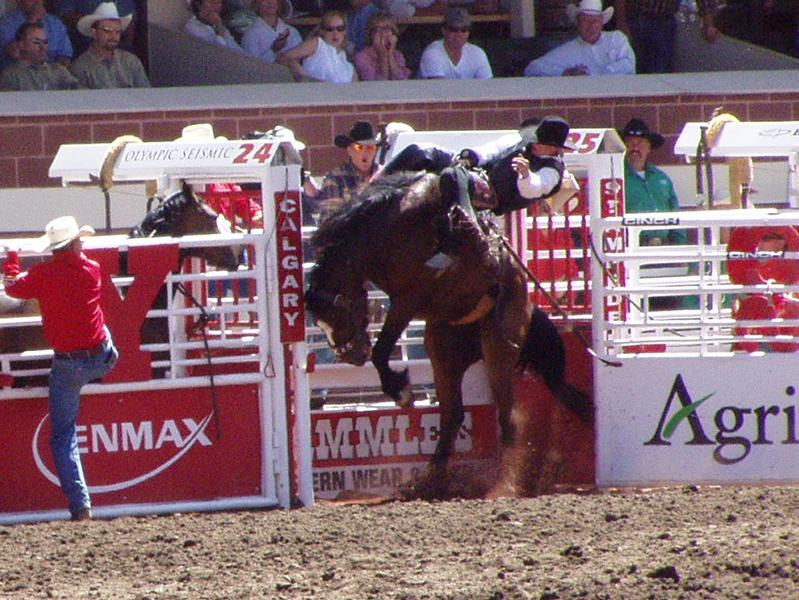
Rider at the Calgary Stampede rodeo, 2002

Ranching in Canada has traditionally been dominated by the province of Alberta. The most successful early settlers of the province were the ranchers, who found Alberta's foothills to be ideal for raising cattle. Most of Alberta's ranchers were English settlers, but cowboys such as John Ware—who brought the first cattle into the province in 1876—were American. American style open range dryland ranching began to dominate southern Alberta (and, to a lesser extent, southwestern Saskatchewan) by the 1880s. The nearby city of Calgary became the centre of the Canadian cattle industry, earning it the nickname "Cowtown". The cattle industry is still extremely important to Alberta, and cattle outnumber people in the province. While cattle ranches defined by barbed-wire fences replaced the open range just as they did in the US, the cowboy influence lives on. Canada's first rodeo, the Raymond Stampede, was established in 1902. In 1912, the Calgary Stampede began, and today it is the world's richest cash rodeo. Each year, Calgary's northern rival Edmonton, Alberta stages the Canadian Finals Rodeo, and dozens of regional rodeos are held through the province. British Columbia also has a significant ranching history and cowboy culture in the interior, and has been home to the Williams Lake Stampede since 1920.

== Outside North America ==
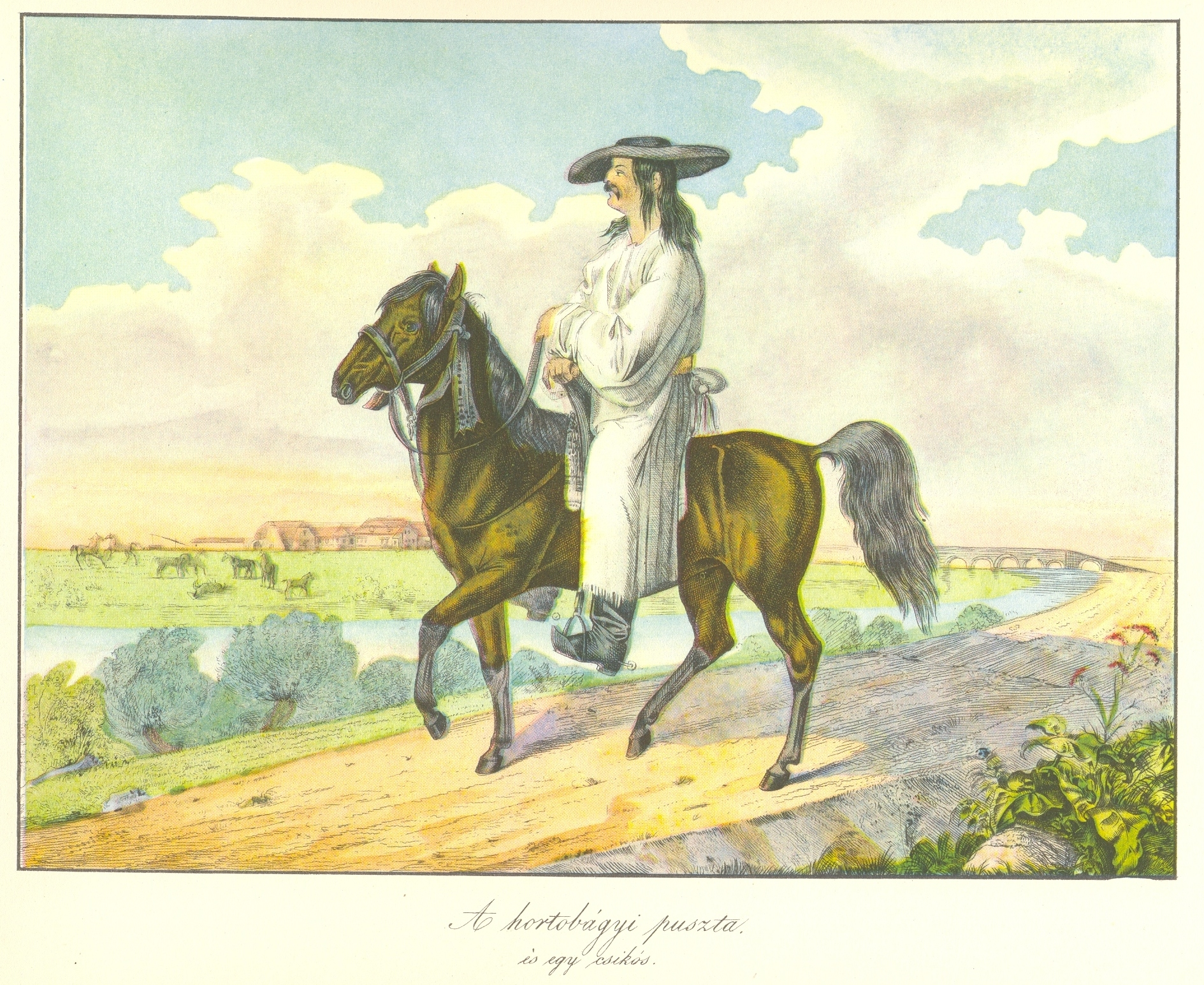
A csikós in the puszta of Hungary, 1846

The necessity for horse riders who guard herds of cattle, sheep or horses is common wherever wide, open land for grazing exists. In the French Camargue, riders called "gardians" herd cattle and horses. In Hungary, csikós guard horses and gulyás tend to cattle. The herders in the region of Maremma, in Tuscany (Italy) are called butteri (singular: buttero). The Asturian pastoral population is referred to as vaqueiros de alzada.

The Spanish exported their horsemanship and knowledge of cattle ranching not only to North America, but also to South America, where traditions developed such as the gaucho of Argentina, Uruguay, Paraguay and (with the spelling gaúcho) southern Brazil, the chalán and Morochuco in Peru, the llanero of Venezuela and Colombia, and the huaso of Chile.

In Australia, where ranches are known as stations, cowboys are known as stockmen and ringers, (jackaroos and jillaroos who also do stockwork are trainee overseers and property managers). The Australian droving tradition was influenced by American and Mexican traditions in the 19th century. The adaptation of both of these traditions to local needs created a unique Australian tradition, which also was strongly influenced by Australian indigenous people, whose knowledge played a key role in the success of cattle ranching in Australia's climate.

== Modern work ==
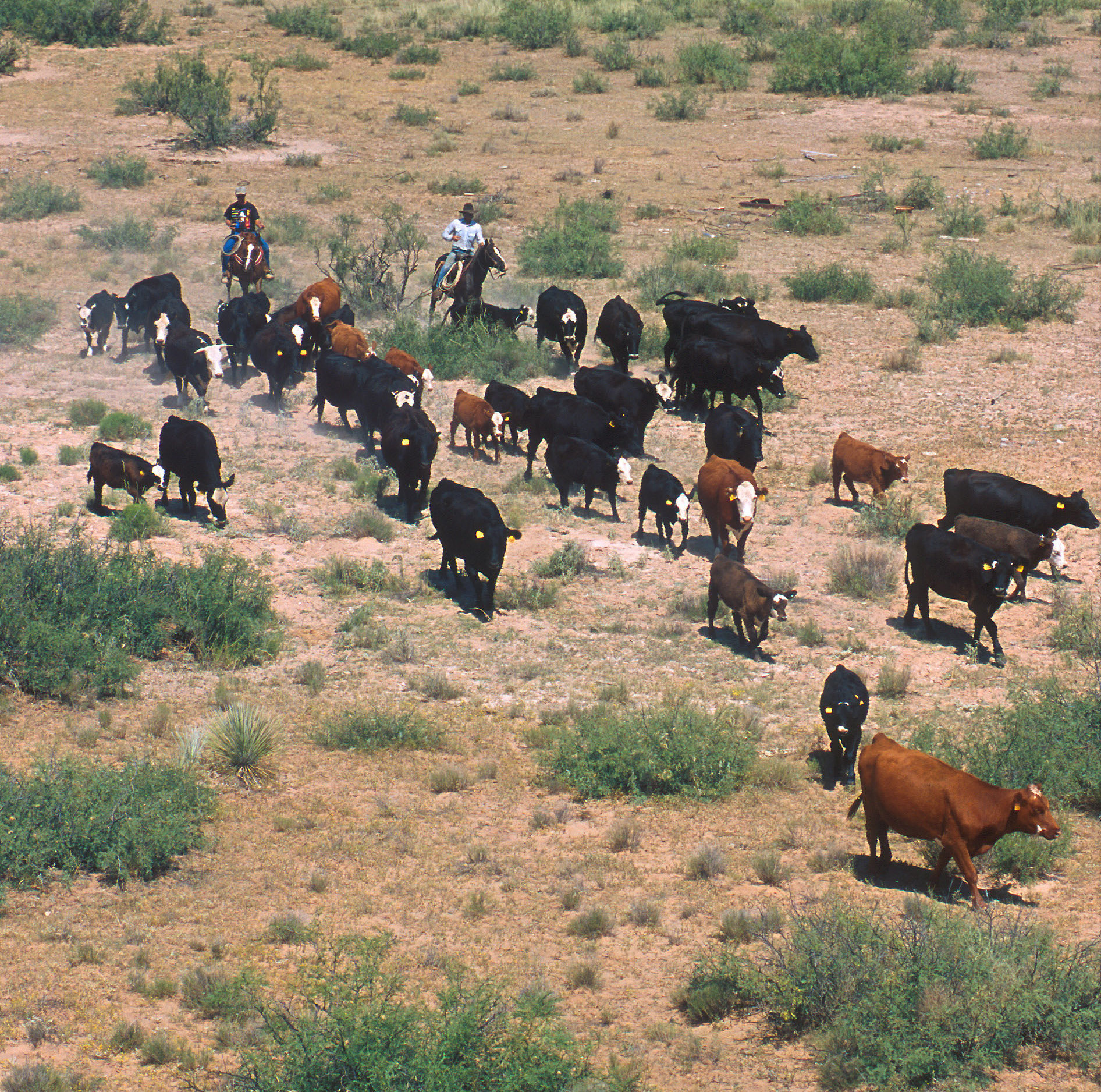
Cattle drive in New Mexico

On the ranch, the cowboy is responsible for feeding the livestock, branding and earmarking cattle (horses also are branded on many ranches), plus tending to animal injuries and other needs. The working cowboy usually is in charge of a small group or "string" of horses and is required to routinely patrol the rangeland in all weather conditions checking for damaged fences, evidence of predation, water problems, and any other issue of concern.

They also move the livestock to different pasture locations, or herd them into corrals and onto trucks for transport. In addition, cowboys may do many other jobs, depending on the size of the "outfit" or ranch, the terrain, and the number of livestock. On a smaller ranch with fewer cowboys—often just family members, cowboys are generalists who perform many all-around tasks; they repair fences, maintain ranch equipment, and perform other odd jobs. On a very large ranch (a "big outfit"), with many employees, cowboys are able to specialize on tasks solely related to cattle and horses. Cowboys who train horses often specialize in this task only, and some may "Break" or train young horses for more than one ranch.

In 2022, Working Ranch Cowboys Association manager Leman Wall estimated that there were approximately 600,000 working cowboys in the United States. The United States Bureau of Labor Statistics collects no figures for “cowboys” per se, and the definition is broad, encompassing ranch hands to rodeo performers, so the exact number of working cowboys is unknown. Working cowboys or ranch hands are included in the 2003 category, Support activities for animal production, which totals 9,730 workers averaging $19,340 per annum. In addition to cowboys working on ranches, in stockyards, and as staff or competitors at rodeos, the category includes farmhands working with other types of livestock (sheep, goats, hogs, chickens, etc.). Of those 9,730 workers, 3,290 are listed in the subcategory of Spectator sports which includes rodeos, circuses, and theaters needing livestock handlers.

=== Attire ===
Most cowboy attire, sometimes termed Western wear, grew out of practical need and the environment in which the cowboy worked. Most items were adapted from the Mexican vaqueros, though sources from other cultures, including Native Americans and mountain men contributed.

- Bandanna; a large cotton neckerchief that had myriad uses: from mopping up sweat to masking the face from dust storms. In modern times, is now more likely to be a silk neckscarf for decoration and warmth.
- Chaps (usually pronounced "shaps") or chinks protect the rider's legs while on horseback, especially riding through heavy brush or during rough work with livestock.
- Cowboy boots; a boot with a high top to protect the lower legs, pointed toes to help guide the foot into the stirrup, and high heels to keep the foot from slipping through the stirrup while working in the saddle; with or without detachable spurs.
- Cowboy hat; High crowned hat with a wide brim to protect from sun, overhanging brush, and the elements. There are many styles, initially influenced by John B. Stetson's Boss of the Plains, which was designed in response to the climatic conditions of the West.
- Gloves, usually of deerskin or other leather that is soft and flexible for working purposes, yet provides protection when handling barbed wire, assorted tools or clearing native brush and vegetation.
- Jeans or other sturdy, close-fitting trousers made of canvas or denim, designed to protect the legs and prevent the trouser legs from snagging on brush, equipment or other hazards. Properly made cowboy jeans also have a smooth inside seam to prevent blistering the inner thigh and knee while on horseback.

Many of these items show marked regional variations. Parameters such as hat brim width, or chap length and material were adjusted to accommodate the various environmental conditions encountered by working cowboys.

=== Tools ===
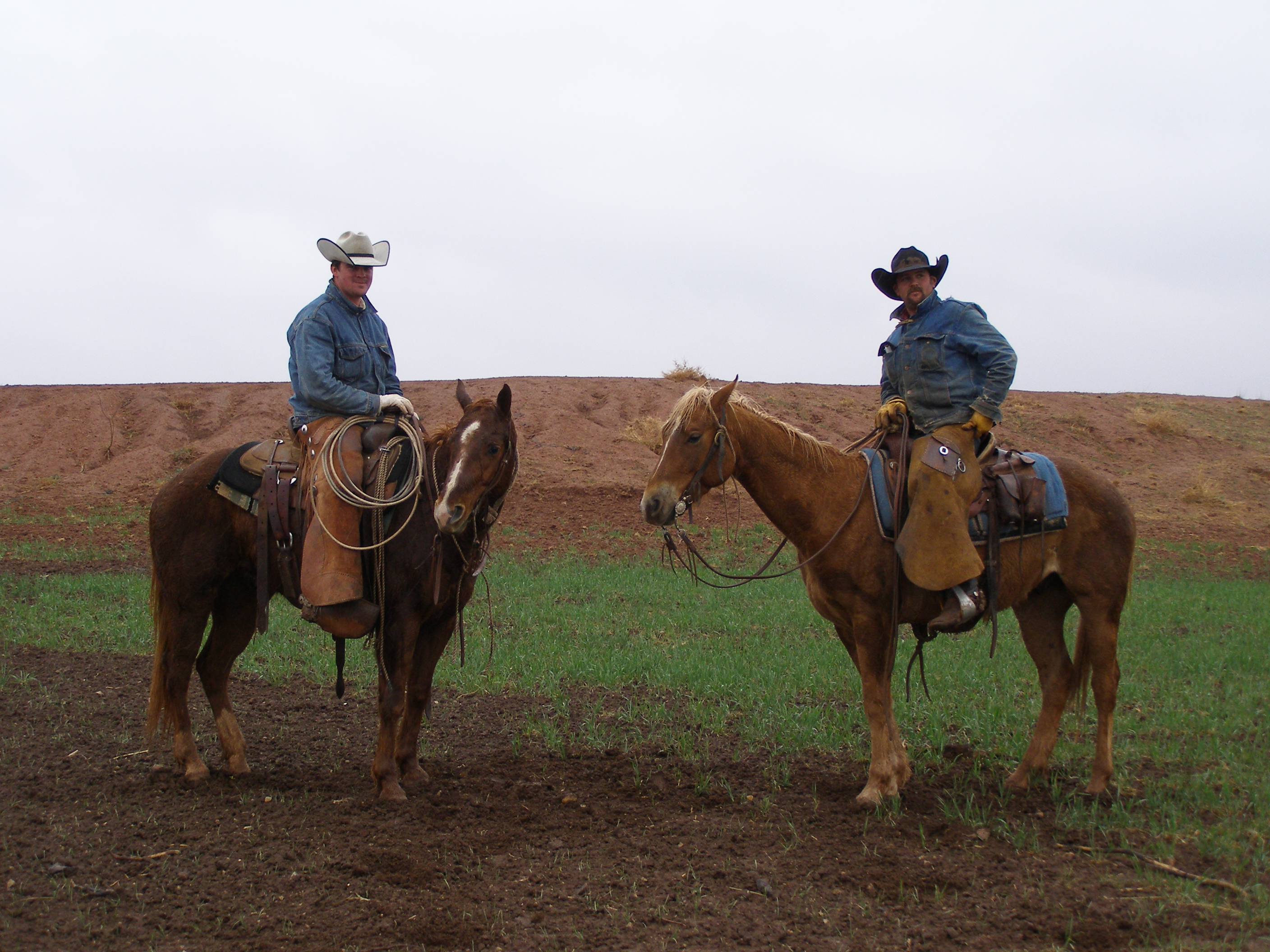
Modern Texas cowboys

- Lariat; from the Spanish "la riata", meaning "the rope", sometimes called a lasso, especially in the East, or simply, a "rope". This is a tightly twisted stiff rope, originally of rawhide or leather, now often of nylon, made with a small loop at one end called a "hondo". When the rope is run through the hondo, it creates a loop that slides easily, tightens quickly and can be thrown to catch animals.
- Spurs; metal devices attached to the heel of the boot, featuring a small metal shank, usually with a small serrated wheel attached, used to allow the rider to provide a stronger (or sometimes, more precise) leg cue to the horse.
- Firearms: Modern cowboys may utilize a rifle to protect livestock from wild animals or feral dogs. Rifles may be carried on horseback in a scabbard attached to a saddle. Riders may instead carry a pistol. ln modern use, firearms are often carried in a pickup truck or ATV.
- Knife; cowboys have traditionally favored some form of pocket knife, specifically the folding cattle knife or stock knife. The knife has multiple blades, usually including a leather punch and a "sheepsfoot" blade.

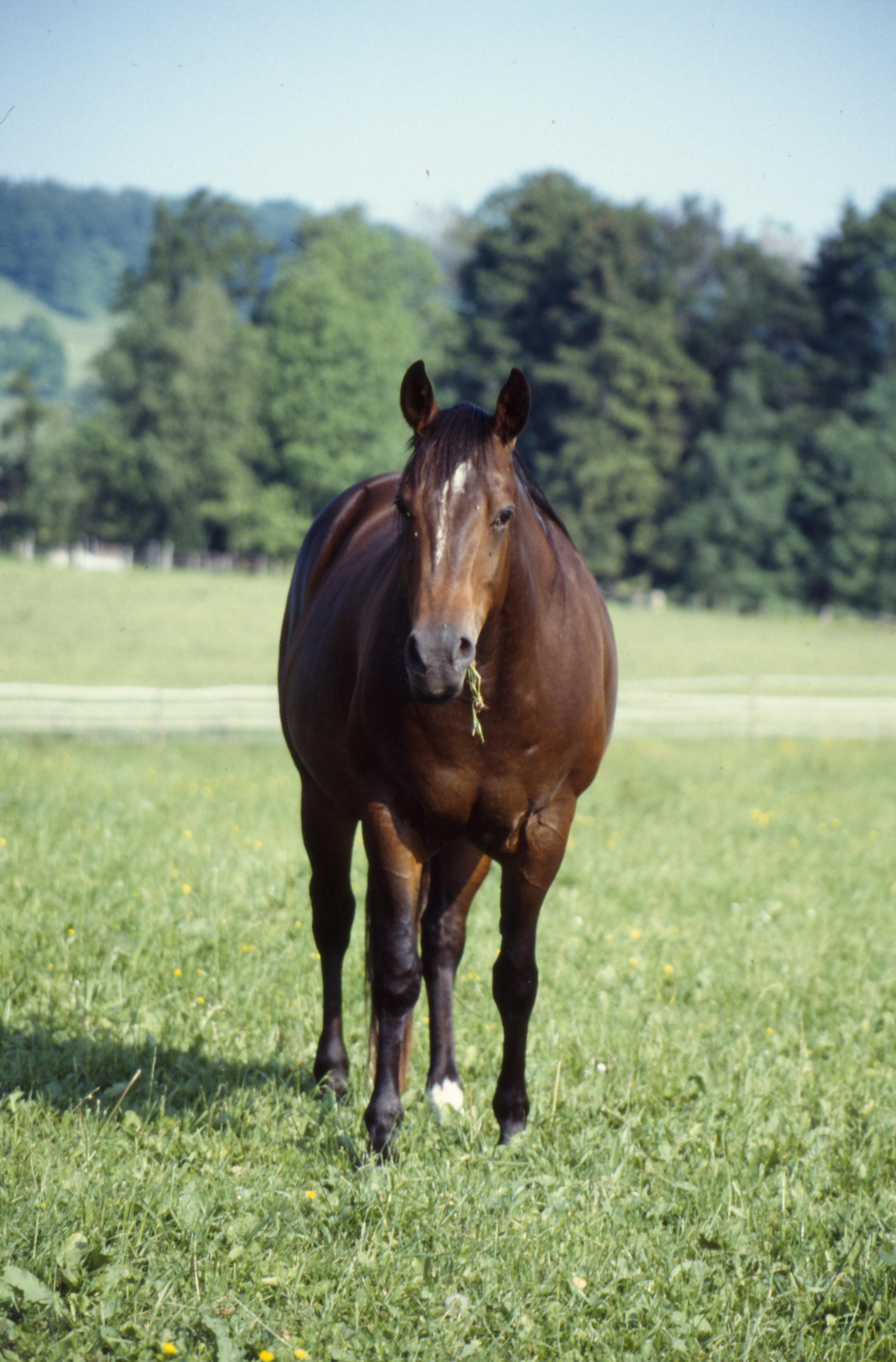
A stock type horse suitable for cattle work

=== Horses ===
The traditional means of transport for the cowboy, even in the modern era, is by horseback. Horses can travel over terrain that vehicles cannot access. Horses, along with mules and burros, also serve as pack animals. The most important horse on the ranch is the everyday working ranch horse that can perform a wide variety of tasks; horses trained to specialize exclusively in one set of skills such as roping or cutting are very rarely used on ranches. Because the rider often needs to keep one hand free while working cattle, the horse must neck rein and have good cow sense—it must instinctively know how to anticipate and react to cattle.

A good stock horse is on the small side, generally under 15.2 hands (62 inches) tall at the withers and often under 1000 pounds, with a short back, sturdy legs and strong muscling, particularly in the hindquarters. While a steer roping horse may need to be larger and weigh more in order to hold a heavy adult cow, bull or steer on a rope, a smaller, quick horse is needed for herding activities such as cutting or calf roping. The horse has to be intelligent, calm under pressure and have a certain degree of 'cow sense" – the ability to anticipate the movement and behavior of cattle.

Many breeds of horse make good stock horses, but the most common today in North America is the American Quarter Horse, which is a horse breed developed primarily in Texas from a combination of Thoroughbred bloodstock crossed on horses of mustang and other Iberian horse ancestry, with influences from the Arabian horse and horses developed on the east coast, such as the Morgan horse and now-extinct breeds such as the Chickasaw and Virginia Quarter-Miler.

=== Tack ===
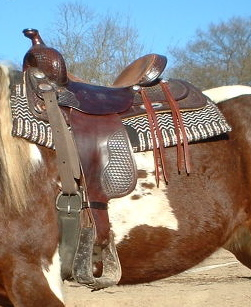
A western saddle

Equipment used to ride a horse is referred to as tack and includes:

- Bridle; a Western bridle usually has a curb bit and long split reins to control the horse in many different situations. Generally the bridle is open-faced, without a noseband, unless the horse is ridden with a tiedown. Young ranch horses learning basic tasks usually are ridden in a jointed, loose-ring snaffle bit, often with a running martingale. In some areas, especially where the "California" style of the vaquero or buckaroo tradition is still strong, young horses are often seen in a bosal style hackamore.
- Martingales of various types are seen on horses that are in training or have behavior problems.
- Saddle bags (leather or nylon) can be mounted to the saddle, behind the cantle, to carry various sundry items and extra supplies. Additional bags may be attached to the front or the saddle.
- Saddle blanket; a blanket or pad is required under the Western saddle to provide comfort and protection for the horse.
- Western saddle; a saddle specially designed to allow horse and rider to work for many hours and to provide security to the rider in rough terrain or when moving quickly in response to the behavior of the livestock being herded. A western saddle has a deep seat with high pommel and cantle that provides a secure seat. Deep, wide stirrups provide comfort and security for the foot. A strong, wide saddle tree of wood, covered in rawhide (or made of a modern synthetic material) distributes the weight of the rider across a greater area of the horse's back, reducing the pounds carried per square inch and allowing the horse to be ridden longer without harm. A horn sits low in front of the rider, to which a lariat can be snubbed, and assorted dee rings and leather "saddle strings" allow additional equipment to be tied to the saddle.

=== Vehicles ===
The most common motorized vehicle driven in modern ranch work is the pickup truck. Sturdy and roomy, with a high ground clearance, and often four-wheel drive capability, it has an open box, called a "bed", and can haul supplies from town or over rough trails on the ranch. It is used to pull stock trailers transporting cattle and livestock from one area to another and to market. With a horse trailer attached, it carries horses to distant areas where they may be needed. Motorcycles are sometimes used instead of horses for some tasks, but the most common smaller vehicle is the four-wheeler. It will carry a single cowboy quickly around the ranch for small chores. In areas with heavy snowfall, snowmobiles are also common. Some jobs remain, particularly working cattle in rough terrain or close quarters, that are best performed by cowboys on horseback.

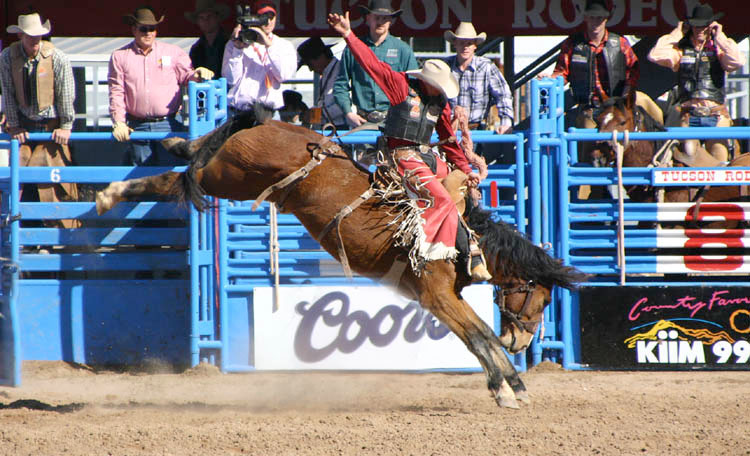
A rodeo cowboy in saddle bronc competition

== Rodeo ==
The word rodeo is from the Spanish rodear (to turn), which means roundup. In the beginning there was no difference between the working cowboy and the rodeo cowboy, and in fact, the term working cowboy did not come into use until the 1950s. Prior to that it was assumed that all cowboys were working cowboys. Early cowboys both worked on ranches and displayed their skills at the roundups.

The advent of professional rodeos allowed cowboys, like many athletes, to earn a living by performing their skills before an audience. Rodeos also provided employment for many working cowboys who were needed to handle livestock. Many rodeo cowboys are also working cowboys and most have working cowboy experience.

The dress of the rodeo cowboy is not very different from that of the working cowboy on his way to town. Snaps, used in lieu of buttons on the cowboy's shirt, allowed the cowboy to escape from a shirt snagged by the horns of steer or bull. Styles were often adapted from the early movie industry for the rodeo. Some rodeo competitors, particularly women, add sequins, colors, silver and long fringes to their clothing in both a nod to tradition and showmanship. Modern riders in "rough stock" events such as saddle bronc or bull riding may add safety equipment such as kevlar vests or a neck brace, but use of safety helmets in lieu of the cowboy hat is yet to be accepted, in spite of constant risk of injury.

== In popular culture ==
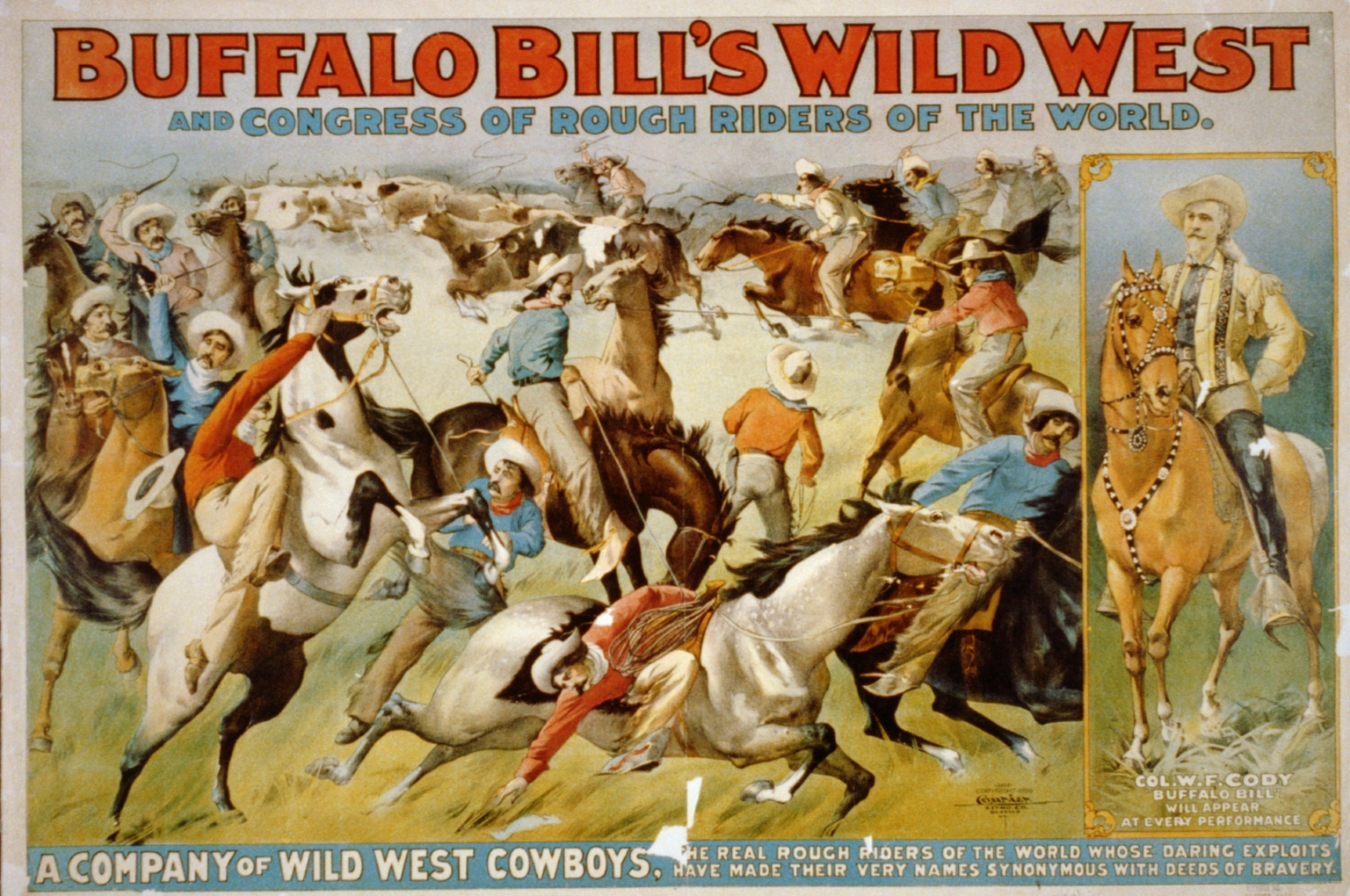
Buffalo Bill's wild west and congress of rough riders of the world – circus poster showing cowboys rounding up cattle, c. 1899

As the frontier ended, the cowboy life came to be highly romanticized. Exhibitions such as those of Buffalo Bill Cody's Wild West Show helped to popularize the image of the cowboy as an idealized representative of the tradition of chivalry.

In today's society, there is little understanding of the daily realities of actual agricultural life. Cowboys are more often associated with (mostly fictitious) Indian-fighting than with their actual life of ranch work and cattle-tending. The cowboy is also portrayed as a masculine ideal via images ranging from the Marlboro Man to the Village People. Actors such as John Wayne are thought of as exemplifying a cowboy ideal, even though western movies seldom bear much resemblance to real cowboy life. Arguably, the modern rodeo competitor is much closer to being an actual cowboy, as many were actually raised on ranches and around livestock, and the rest have needed to learn livestock-handling skills on the job.

In the United States, the Canadian West and Australia, guest ranches offer people the opportunity to ride horses and get a taste of the western life—albeit in far greater comfort. Some ranches also offer vacationers the opportunity to actually perform cowboy tasks by participating in cattle drives or accompanying wagon trains. This type of vacation was popularized by the 1991 movie City Slickers, starring Billy Crystal.

=== Symbolism ===
In 2005, the United States Senate declared the fourth Saturday of July as "National Day of the American Cowboy" via a Senate resolution and has subsequently renewed this resolution each year, with the United States House of Representatives periodically issuing statements of support. The long history of the West in popular culture tends to define those clothed in Western clothing as cowboys or cowgirls whether they have ever been on a horse or not. This is especially true when applied to entertainers and those in the public arena who wear Western wear as part of their persona. Many other people, particularly in the West, including lawyers, bankers, and other white collar professionals wear elements of Western clothing, particularly cowboy boots or hats, as a matter of form even though they have other jobs. Conversely, some people raised on ranches do not necessarily define themselves cowboys or cowgirls unless they feel their primary job is to work with livestock or if they compete in rodeos.

Actual cowboys have derisive expressions for individuals who adopt cowboy mannerisms as a fashion pose without any actual understanding of the culture. For example, a "drugstore cowboy" means someone who wears the clothing but does not actually sit upon anything but the stool of the drugstore soda fountain—or, in modern times, a bar stool. Similarly, the phrase "all hat and no cattle" is used to describe someone (usually male) who boasts about himself, far in excess of any actual accomplishments. The word "dude" (or the now-archaic term "greenhorn") indicates an individual unfamiliar with cowboy culture, especially one who is trying to pretend otherwise.

Outside of the United States, the cowboy has become an archetypal image of Americans abroad. In the late 1950s, a Congolese youth subculture calling themselves the Bills based their style and outlook on Hollywood's depiction of cowboys in movies. Something similar occurred with the term "Apache", which in early 20th century Parisian society was a slang term for an outlaw.

=== Negative connotation ===
The word "cowboy" is sometimes used pejoratively. Originally this derived from the behavior of some cowboys in the boomtowns of Kansas, at the end of the trail for long cattle drives, where cowboys developed a reputation for violence and wild behavior due to the inevitable impact of large numbers of cowboys, mostly young single men, receiving their pay in large lump sums upon arriving in communities with many drinking and gambling establishments.

"Cowboy" as an adjective for "reckless" developed in the 1920s. "Cowboy" is sometimes used today in a derogatory sense to describe someone who is reckless or ignores potential risks, irresponsible or who heedlessly handles a sensitive or dangerous task. Time magazine referred to President George W. Bush's foreign policy as "Cowboy diplomacy", and Bush has been described in the press, particularly in Europe, as a "cowboy", not realizing that this was not a compliment.

In English-speaking regions outside North America, such as the British Isles and Australasia, "cowboy" can refer to a tradesman whose work is of shoddy and questionable value, e.g., "a cowboy plumber". The term also lent itself to the British 1980s TV sitcom, Cowboys. Similar usage is seen in the United States to describe someone in the skilled trades who operates without proper training or licenses. In the eastern United States, "cowboy" as a noun is sometimes used to describe a fast or careless driver on the highway.

== See also ==
- American Old West
- American West
- Black cowboys
- Cowboy church
- Estancia
- Gaucho
- Gunfighter
- Herding
- List of cowboys and cowgirls
- List of Ranches and Stations
- Agricultural fencing
- Livestock branding
- Station (Australian agriculture):
  - Stockman (Australia)
- Singing cowboys
- Transhumance

In art and culture

- Audition (performing arts) also known as a "cattle call".
- Fashion: "Rhinestone Cowboy", Western wear
- Film: Drugstore Cowboy, Western movie ("Western"), List of Western movies
- Fine art: Earl W. Bascom, Frederic Remington, Charles Russell, Cowboy Artists of America
- Literature: Cowboy poetry, Western fiction literature, List of Western fiction authors
- Music: List of famous Cowboy songs, Western Music (North America), Western swing, Western Music Association, Academy of Western Artists
- Sports: Cowboy action shooting, Charreada, Indian rodeo, Rodeo.
- Television: TV Western
