= Remuda =

Herd of horses used for ranching or a cattle drive

A remuda is a horse herd from which ranch-hands select their mounts. The word is of Spanish derivation, meaning 'remount', i.e.: "change of horses", and is in common use in the American West.

The person in charge of the remuda is generally known as a wrangler. The wrangler provides spare horses during roundup, when cowboys change mounts three to four times a day.

== Necessity ==
West of the Mississippi River, ranches are larger in acreage than are the farms to the east. Historically, cattle grazed, mostly unattended, on the open range before being rounded up and driven to market.

In present times in early summer, cattle are released onto U.S. Forest Service or Bureau of Land Management lands, where the rancher pays the U.S. government for a lease, often of multiple sections of land. Most public land is still open range, unfenced or minimally fenced. Cattle are still rounded up and brought in off the range in the late summer and fall, with breeding stock sorted and moved to winter pasture, and animals for sale selected for shipping to feedlots.

In both historical and modern times, the necessity of rounding up cattle from the open range is a job primarily performed by a cowboy mounted on a horse. Historically, the long-distance cattle drives required cattle to first be gathered, then herded over long distances, often requiring several weeks of travel, covering up to 30 miles (48 km) in a day to bring herds of cattle several hundred miles to a railhead for sale and shipping. Today, though cattle are usually rounded up and herded only as far as a decent road where they can be loaded onto livestock trailers or semi-trailers. The terrain as well as unpredictable behavior of cattle render motorized vehicles virtually useless for rounding up and herding. Thus, in modern times, the use of horses remains essential.

== Management ==
During roundups and for moving cattle, several horses are required for each cowboy. During a roundup in modern times, a cowboy may need to switch horses two or three times each day to rest each horse for use on subsequent days and avoid injury to horse and rider that may result from a fall or misstep by a fatigued animal. During the historic cattle drive era, each cowboy required about six horses on a cattle drive, switching the animals daily or even twice daily. Thus, the spare horses must be kept close to the cattle herd and moved along with the cattle so as to be available to riders as needed. The horses graze whenever possible along the way and at night to obtain adequate forage. The herd of spare horses was given the name remuda. The remuda would be kept separately from the cattle herd for a number of reasons. It was more convenient to the riders not to have to sort horses out of a much larger herd of cattle. It was also safer for the animals; the cattle would not be unduly disturbed by the antics of quick-moving horses and riders moving through the herd, and the horses were at less risk of injury from conflicts with cattle, particularly breeds such as the Texas longhorn noted for their substantial horns.

In modern times, the remuda may be housed in corrals at the trailhead or gathering site, though historically, and in remote areas in modern times where there are few or no corrals, the herd would be kept loose on the range, under the charge of people called wranglers, whose exclusive job was to manage the horse herd.

Although many modern horses are now trained to accept being caught and haltered by a rider on foot without attempting to run away, the same was not true of the often partly trained, semi-feral horses used in the Old West, who could only be easily caught with a lasso. Obtaining these horses each morning required a special system. When corrals were available, the remuda would be run into an enclosed area where the horses could be caught. On the open range, a temporary corral could be created by pounding stakes into the ground in a large circle with a rope attached around the stakes to form a makeshift barrier. The horses had been trained sufficiently to accept even the minimal confinement of a rope corral and not test the fence. In some places, the wranglers simply kept the horses gathered in a tight group, often by providing fodder.
