= Pinhook Draw fight =

1881 battle of the American Indian Wars

Coordinates: 38.592°N 109.306°W

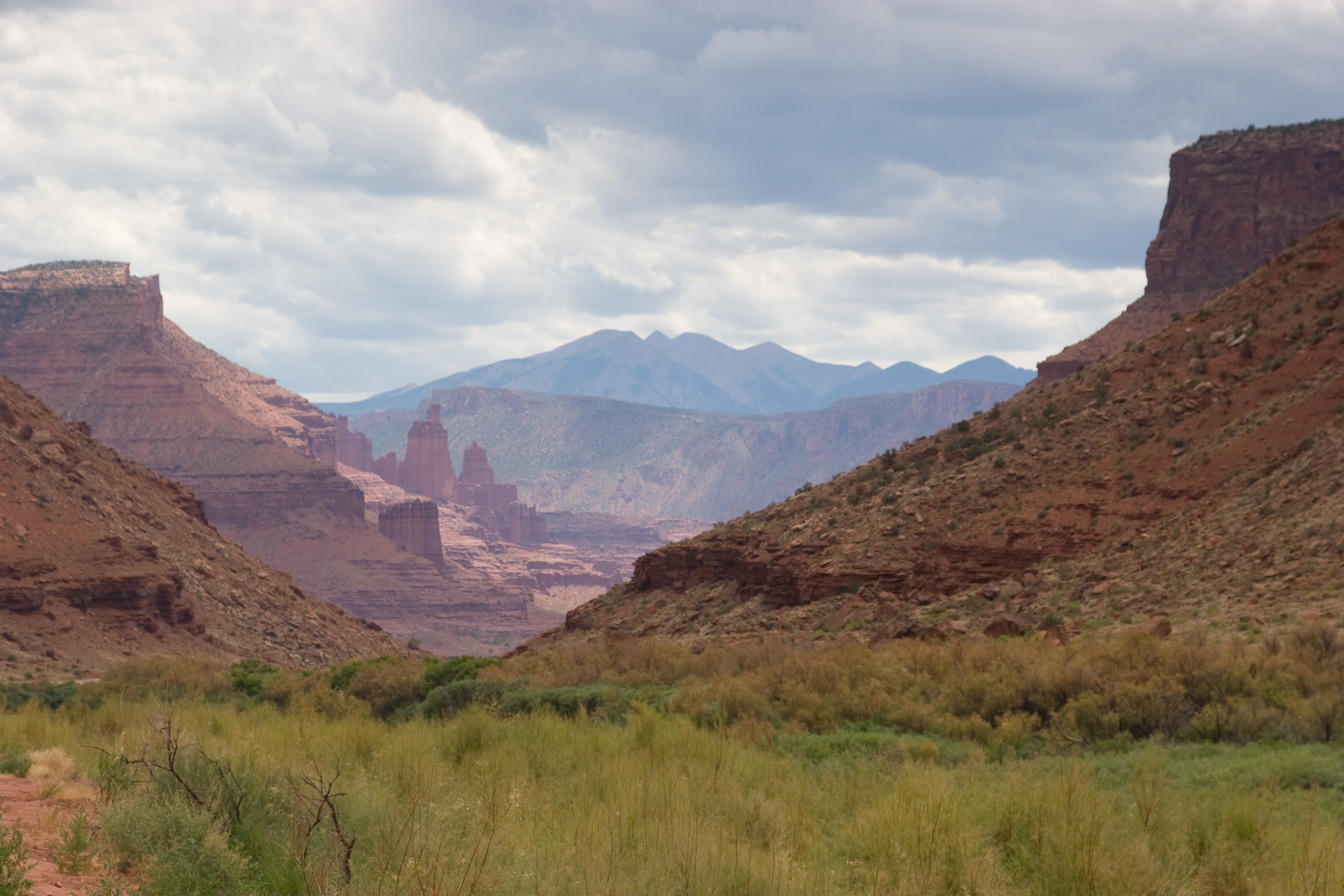
- The terrain near the battle site
Date	15–16 June 1881
Location	near Moab, Utah, United States
Result	Ute victory

Belligerents
Civilian volunteers	Ute people

Strength
~35 civilian volunteers	~30–65 warriors

Casualties and losses
10 killed	probably 2 killed

The Pinhook Draw fight took place June 15–16, 1881, near Moab, Utah. It was part of a series of clashes between the Ute people and Anglo-American settlers sometimes termed the Ute Wars. The combatants were 30 to 65 Ute and Paiute people and about three dozen white settlers, mostly cowboys and miners from southwestern Colorado and southeastern Utah. The settlers sought revenge against the Utes for other conflicts in the region and to recover stolen livestock. The white men were in pursuit of an encampment of Utes when the Utes ambushed them in Pinhook Draw. Ten whites were killed and the bodies of two Utes were found after the battle.

== Background ==
Southeastern Utah and southwestern Colorado were historically inhabited by Ute people and a culturally similar tribe, the Paiute. Prior to European colonization of the region, both Native American tribes were nomadic, moving with the seasons to utilize the limited resources of this desert and mountain area. The Paiute practiced springtime floodplain farming with reservoirs and irrigation ditches for corn, squash, melons, gourds, sunflowers, beans, and wheat.

In 1868, six bands of the Utes signed a treaty with the United States ceding the eastern part of their range and being granted a reservation of 16,500,000 acres (67,000 km^{2}) (25,781 square miles) comprising most of the western one-third of Colorado. In the 1870s miners began to encroach on the Ute reservation, and in 1873 a new agreement permitted mining in 3,700,000 acres (15,000 km^{2}) (5,780 square miles) of their reservation in the San Juan Mountains. Though the treaty prohibited the building of permanent settlements within the mining area, Anglo miners and cattle ranchers rushed into the area nevertheless.

In 1879, two events caused the Utes to lose most of the remainder of their land in Colorado: the Meeker Massacre, and the propaganda campaign called "The Ute must Go" by Colorado Governor Frederick W. Pitkin. In the aftermath of the Meeker Massacre, most of the Utes' land was confiscated and opened to Anglo settlement and the northern Ute bands were expelled from Colorado to a much smaller reservation in the Utah Territory. The southern Ute bands retained small reservations in southwestern Colorado. A number of Utes continued to live off the reservations in southeastern Utah, which was largely uninhabited by white settlers until 1880.

Relations between the miners and cattle ranchers and the Utes in southwestern Colorado were poor. The Utes were accused of stealing horses and cattle, begging food, robbing cabins, and making threats. In 1880, a newspaper in Dolores, Colorado said the Anglo settlers should "muster every man into active service, procure guns, ammunition, and other necessities, and pursue, kill the red-skinned devils." The Ute view was that the Anglos had broken a treaty and confiscated Ute land needed by them to survive.

== Opening shots ==
On May 1, 1881, a group of Utes killed two ranchers near Dolores in a gun battle sparked by a dispute. The Indians, mostly Utes, stole money, food, horses, and arms from the ranchers and journeyed to Dodge Springs, 10 miles (16 km) south of Monticello, Utah, where they met up with another group of Utes. The two groups of Utes numbered about 90, including 30 men. (Another estimate of the number of Utes was 95, including 65 men.) They stole horses in this area and killed livestock. Monticello residents assembled a posse of 25 civilian men and followed the Utes' trail into the La Sal Mountains. They were joined by another posse of 65 men, mostly cowboys, from Colorado who were also on the search for Utes and stolen livestock. After a long and difficult search, the combined posses found the Ute camp on June 12 near present-day Warner Lake in the northwestern La Sals. The elected leader of the posse, Bill Dawson, planned to attack the Utes, but the number of men remaining in his force numbered only about three dozen after many men dropped out during the pursuit or were unwilling to fight. The Ute leader, to the extent they had a leader, was called Mancos Jim.

On June 15, Dawson and his men attacked the Ute encampment and the Utes fled. Dawson captured a large part of the Ute horse herd, estimated at 1,500 head, and nine women. He left 13 men behind to guard the women and the horses and continued pursuing the Utes. The women soon escaped and took with them not only the Ute horses but also the cowboys' horses. The cowboys walked to Moab.

== The battle ==
Dawson and his men pursued the Utes for about 5 miles (8.0 km) northwards into a narrow canyon called Pinhook Draw near the upper entrance of Castle Canyon. There, from higher ground, the Utes ambushed the cowboys. Accounts of the battle are contradictory, but a six-man advance force of the cowboys was wiped out during the course of the afternoon. That evening Dawson's group was reinforced by the 13 men who had walked to Moab, giving him a total force of about two dozen, three of whom were seriously wounded. He withdrew his men under cover of darkness to Mason Spring, about 3 miles (4.8 km) south of Pinhook Draw. He did not know the fate of his advance party.

The next morning ten men from Moab joined Dawson and he returned to Pinhook Draw to find his missing advance party. The cowboys were again attacked by the Utes and again retreated to Mason Spring. Dawson sent a man to Rico, Colorado with a request for reinforcements. On June 24, two dozen men arrived from Rico. By that time the battle was long over. The Utes had moved along, heading back for Colorado. The three wounded men were sent to Moab for treatment. On June 20, Dawson and his men returned to Pinhook Draw and found the bodies of those in the advance party. The final toll of dead cowboys was ten. A later search found the bodies of a Ute woman and man killed by the cowboys during the battle. Mancos Jim was reported later by one source to have said that 22 Utes had been killed in the battle.

== Aftermath ==
On their return home, the cowboys met four companies of African-American Buffalo Soldiers (about 190 men) commanded by Captain Henry Carroll, an experienced Indian fighter. Carroll did not want civilians interfering in Indian affairs and threatened to arrest the members of the posse. According to one account, an armed confrontation between the soldiers and cowboys took place, but was resolved when two members of the posse agreed to guide the soldiers on the trail of the Utes. The soldiers' search for the Utes was fruitless, but two were later arrested on the Ute Reservation in Colorado and sent to prison for their part in the battle. Several Utes who participated in the battle—Mancos Jim, Polk, and Posey—would continue to figure prominently in southeastern Utah for decades to come.
