= Wrangler (profession) =

Animal (especially horse) handler

- A horse wrangler

Occupation
- Names: Wrangler
- Pronunciation: /ˈraŋɡlə/
- Occupation type: Vocation
- Activity sectors: Agriculture

Description
- Competencies: Cattle work, horses
- Education required: No formal education
- Fields of employment: Film industry, rodeo and equestrian
- Related jobs: Cowboy, herder

In North America, a wrangler is someone employed to professionally handle animals, especially livestock, but sometimes other types of animals including bears, wolf packs, big cats, primates and reptiles. The word "wrangler" is derived from the Low German "wrangeln" meaning "to dispute" or "to wrestle". It was first documented in 1377. Its use as a noun was first recorded in 1547. Its reference to a "person in charge of horses or cattle" or "herder" was first recorded in 1888.

A wrangler is an individual involved in the process of training, taming, controlling and handling various animals, specifically horses. Traditionally this process involves herding cattle and bringing horses in from the paddock. Wranglers often work for other cowboys or tourists who want to ride on North American ranches. Variations of wrangling include managing herds, dude-wrangling, rodeo and managing horses as a part of stunt work in the film industry. Wranglers are also considered a subcategory of cowboys, being responsible for herding horses rather than cattle. The profession of wrangling has developed over time, as wranglers are educated to perform more activities as the tourism sector has become increasingly important in the employment of wranglers.

Wranglers also handle the horses and other animals during the making of motion pictures. A dude-wrangler is a cowboy or guide that takes non-wranglers and non-cowboys (dudes) on western riding horseback trips.

In the film industry, a wrangler is also one who professionally searches for and/or handles particular products on film and television programs, and music videos, such as custom cars or animals.

== History ==
During the 1920s the wrangler's transition into the service economy reliant on tourism, while keeping alive the ‘romantic West,’ contrasted the original conception of wrangling as an occupation as it was previously characterised by self-reliance and expertise. Wrangling has also been impacted by developments in technology and science influencing the scale and speed at which they can herd horses.

== Education ==
Wrangling in the film industry, as part of stunt work, requires extensive training and commitment in various disciplines. This includes the ability of the wrangler to train horses for stunts and liberty work over long periods of time. Wranglers from local areas can also be familiar with smaller groups of horses and therefore identify an individual horse from the herd. They are trained to identify horse behaviour and a given horse's age, fitness, gender, and health in an instant. In order to prevent injury or health concerns with horses, the wrangler possesses a specialised role in an outfit. An outfit is a band or unit of cowboys, cooks, and wranglers who would travel together in roundups and on trails.

Older wranglers are often responsible for the training of younger ones, passing down common knowledge and advice, rather than a broader and institutionalised education system. Wranglers are often prospective cowhands wrangling in order to learn the basics about stock work. Education therefore does not consist of formal instruction. Instead, wranglers and cowboys are expected to learn on the job and grow into higher positions of management.

== Activities ==
=== Film industry ===
The wrangler, also associated with the care and maintenance of the horse, is in some circumstances responsible for maintaining the ethical treatment of horses. Ethical issues about the modern management of horses, such as radio collars placed on wild horses (which could cut into the necks of growing horses), also reinforced in wranglers a scepticism of scientific and modern procedures in wrangling and reinforced traditional methods. Wranglers must also ensure that living and training facilities are suitable and large enough to house a certain number of horses.

Wranglers involved in the production of The Hobbit: An Unexpected Journey (2012) revealed that despite concerns they had displayed about the farm in which the horses were being held, the production company was responsible for the deaths of up to 27 animals. The animal wranglers were previously fired from production but were also supported by claims from PETA (People for the Ethical Treatment of Animals) suggesting that issues concerning the housing of horses stemmed from overcrowding and unsafe barbed fencing.

Another example is horses in the film Horses of McBride (2012) in which there were extremely specific requirements for the cast of horses required. The film, depicting the struggle to save two starving horses, required extremely malnourished black and sorrel horses. One such horse, Lady, was typecast as needing to be rescued. A suitable horse was discovered by the film's horse wrangler and rescued from bleak conditions and given adequate food and restored to full health. Therefore, the wrangler's role in this industry requires much research and casting behind the scenes, as stunt doubles were also required.

Wranglers could also be required to train actors to ride and drive horse-drawn wagons, and have a historical knowledge of horses and their uses. Stunt-horses had to be very specific, not only fulfilling the demands of the director and actors, but also the type of horse required to perform a specific stunt. Once the right horse has been found, the horse must be trained and gain confidence. The wrangler is responsible for being aware of the horse's capabilities and limitations in these stunts. A ‘head wrangler’ on set may also be responsible for providing and sourcing all horses required for a stunt. Wranglers in the film industry are often involved with a larger variety of animals other than horses, including sheep and other livestock.

Many horses trained by wranglers are generally horses in the background of scenes, as opposed to being ridden by actors. They are required to remain calm and well-behaved and must be accustomed to lights, activity and cameras. Wranglers in films are often required to work long days, and care for various horses throughout. Often horses need to simply walk from one end of the shot to other and in other circumstances the wrangler is required to ride them. They can also be cast as extras such as lorry drivers and wagon drivers.

The wrangler is also required to provide various types of horse equipment and tack.

=== Dude-wranglers ===
Dude-wranglers are responsible for training horses and leading trips, as has long been custom, and have come to be expected to be charismatic and gentlemanly as part of their service. There was often no explicit indication that the dude-wranglers required to be handsome and characteristic, nevertheless, it was often clear that women were expectant of this. The dude-wrangler stereotype suggests that he was to be talented, outgoing and experienced, what would become a standard of Western masculinity. The role of the wrangler therefore became a role in which this masculinity could be proven.

The wrangler was also responsible for minding children on trails, accommodating for the whole family. Often the individual would expect to be able to become a competent horseman under the instruction of a horse wrangler.

Dude-wranglers are required to handle people just as well as they handle horses. They are required to interact with guests and sell the ranch experience as they provide funds for the ranch just as cattle do for others. The wranglers are a type of mediator between visitor and land, as they require an extensive knowledge of equipment, veterinary care and horsemanship, while the visitor does not. The wrangler is required to provide a pleasing temperament despite strenuous tasks, for it is what keeps him his job. He is often required to comply to a standard of presentation concerning attire, hygiene and relationship with guests.

=== Ranch work ===
Breaking a horse is another responsibility of the wrangler. Traditionally this would consist of roping and corralling the bronc, or unbroken, wild horse, and attempting to ride it until it submitted to the rider. The wrangler would continue to buck on the horse and accustom it to both bridle and saddle. The bronc riders job was considered to, “educate,” these horses and for others, to take the education out of them, therefore either taming wild horses, or un-taming timid ones. These horses were broken in order to ride or drive them, often broken by wranglers for themselves or neighbours. The horses could then be traded or swapped.

Modern wranglers have learned to communicate with a horse through subtle observation and body language. The idea is to produce a positive relationship between horse and wrangler, as the horse ‘wants’ to perform an action for the rider, rather than being forced to do so. This is a type of natural horsemanship. Often a wrangler could break horses for a specific purpose, such as younger geldings for riding, and could tell the suitability of a horse from only a few moments in the saddle.

Wranglers in locations such as Shenandoah in West Virginia advocate a type of modern wrangling which places the horse's wellbeing at the forefront of their practice. As well as completing the usual duties; grooming, feeding and watering the horses; the wranglers also monitor the health of the horses. The wranglers also tailor the horses dietary requirements to best suit them, as well as customisable bridles and saddles. Modern wranglers such as these also focus on building a trusting partnership between horse and rider based on natural horsemanship. The wrangler is also responsible for the sale of horses, pairing clients with horses of the appropriate type and personality.

Wranglers were also involved in ranch work such as cutting horses and cattle (that is, separating them from the rest of the herd) as well as branding cattle. Each ranch had a specific brand that was to be cast onto calves in order to identify the ownership of cattle. They can also be responsible for basic veterinary care, such as transporting animals, feeding them, branding them and accustoming or ‘gentling’ them to riders.

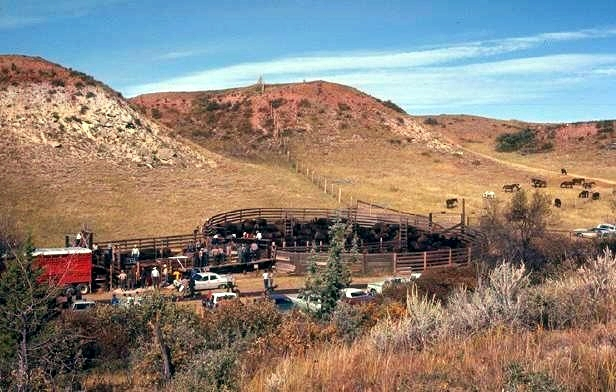
Wild horses in a roundup at the Theodore Roosevelt National Park

A horse wrangler is also part of what is known as a trail crew, consisting of drovers, a trail boss, a cook and the wrangler. These trails would herd between 2, 000 and 3, 000 cattle over a number of days.

During the day the wrangler, or more colloquially the ‘jingler,’ drives the horses and finds pasture for them, often rounding them up multiple times in one day in order for the cowboys or ranch hands to change horses. This is known as the remuda. In the Old West of America it was also historically referred to as a cavvy. The remuda must be spread out in suitable pasture, watered and easily separated into pens (corralled) for mounting when required in order for the wrangler to be performing his role successfully. In order to do so, the wrangler is required to know each horse and be able to locate them. The wrangler is therefore responsible for the well-being and overall condition of the herd.

When not performing these roles, the wrangler also works in the kitchen, cooking and cleaning. This involves collecting wood and water for the kitchen, chopping wood, preparing the food. The wrangler is further responsible for setting up and disassembling the campsite, hooking and unhooking the wagon, loading the wagon and taking down the rope corral. Working and partnering with the wrangler is the nighthawk who watches over the herd at night and returns them to the wrangler in the morning. Often when on a farmer's or ‘grangers’ roundup, the outfit would find an empty field or pasture to set up for the night. They would either set up a large tent for the night, and when in good weather, would roll out the beds on any suitable flat surface outside.

== Demography ==
Wranglers are often the youngest men of the ranch and have often been romanticised for their toughness, looks and masculinity, especially as represented in film, literature and iconography. Typically wranglers have been dominantly represented as men, due to the tough physical demands of wrangling. However, women performing similar tasks is not uncommon. Although there was this emphasis on male riders, there was equal opportunity to females as well. Some accounts emphasise the reliability and keenness of a female wrangler as a desirable trail rider. Most of the wranglers found at round-up events in the past were men, but a few women could also be observed.

Many wranglers are also long-time locals who have grown up participating in equine and rodeo events, often with a similar heritage. Wranglers with these backgrounds could begin at ages as young as 10 years old. They would hear and see a lot at such a young age, and expected to be tough and durable.

Wranglers and cowboys are becoming less and less common as they are replaced with modern occupations such as biologists and animal researchers who are often more reliant on education and theoretical knowledge, rather than having extensive practice with horses. The idea that the horse specialists, such as wranglers, have spent large amounts of time with horses, are familiar and can identify with them is also becoming less common.

The three main states that remain occupied by wranglers in the United States are California, Arizona and Wyoming.

== See also ==
- American frontier
- Animal husbandry
- Animal training
- Cowboy
- Teamster
- Groom (profession)
- Horse training
- Wrangler (University of Cambridge)
