= Cowboy diplomacy =

Intimidating resolution of a conflict

Cowboy diplomacy is a term used by critics to describe the resolution of international conflicts through brash risk-taking, intimidation, military deployment, or a combination of such tactics. It is criticized as stemming from an overly simple, dichotomous world view. Overtly provocative phraseology typically centralizes the message.

One of the earliest known applications of the term was in 1902, when it was used by the American press to describe U.S. President Theodore Roosevelt's foreign policies. Roosevelt had at the time summarized his approach to international diplomacy as "Speak softly and carry a big stick", an adage that was engraved on a bronze plaque on Donald Rumsfeld's office desk in the Pentagon and has set the modern precedent.

The term has since been applied to the presidential administrations of Ronald Reagan, George W. Bush, and Donald Trump.

== See also ==
- Foreign policy of the United States
- Criticism of U.S. foreign policy
- Gunboat diplomacy
