= Bitless bridle =

Type of horse equipment

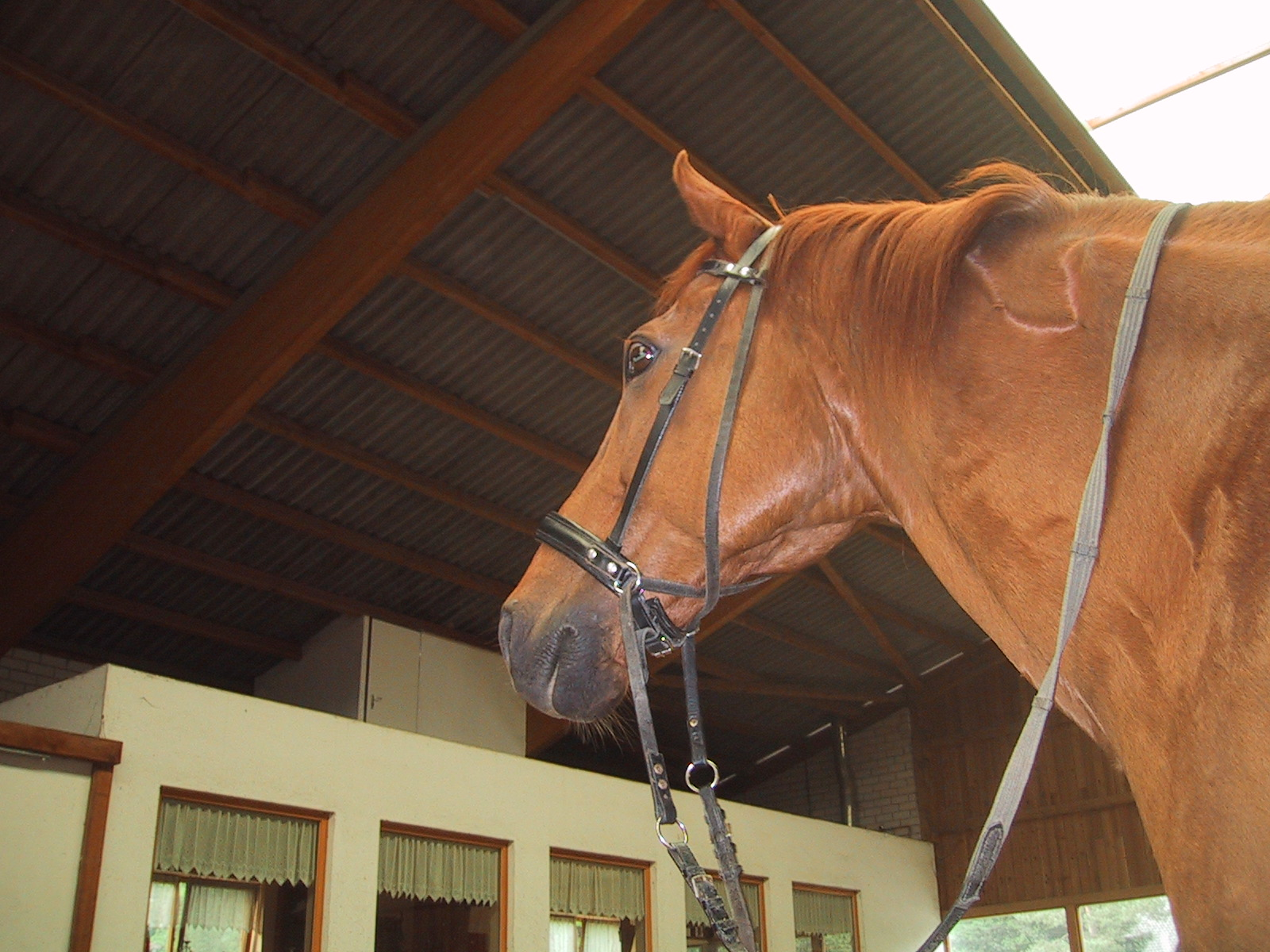
A cross-under bitless bridle

A bitless bridle is a general term describing a wide range of headgear for horses or other animals that directs the animal without using a bit. Direction control may also be via a noseband or cavesson, if one is used. The term hackamore is the most historically accurate word for most common forms of bitless headgear. However, some modern bitless designs of horse headgear lack the heavy noseband of a true hackamore and instead use straps that tighten around a horse's head to apply pressure in various ways. These are often specifically patented and marketed as "bitless bridles", usually referencing a particular type of headgear known as the cross-under, though other designs are sometimes also given similar names.

== Origins ==
It is likely that the first domesticated horses were ridden with some type of noseband, made of various materials such as sinew, leather, or rope. However, because the materials used to make gear other than metal bits disintegrates quickly, archaeological evidence of the earliest use of bitless designs has been difficult to find. The earliest artistic evidence of use of some form of bitless bridle was found in illustrations of Synian horsemen, dated approximately 1400 BC. However, domestication of the horse occurred between 4500 and 3500 BC, while earliest evidence of the use of bits, located in two sites of the Botai culture, dates to about 3500–3000 BC. Thus there is a very high probability that some sort of headgear was used to control horses prior to the development of the bit.

Ancient Mesopotamian forms of bitless headgear were refined into the hakma, a design featuring a heavy braided noseband which dates to the reign of Darius in Ancient Persia, approximately 500 BC. It is the predecessor to the modern bosal-style hackamore as well as the French cavesson, particularly the modern longeing cavesson.

Some modern styles of "bitless bridle" date to a "bitless safety bridle" patented in 1893, with refinements patented in 1912 and 1915.

== Use ==
Bitless bridles apply pressure to parts of the horse's face and head, such as the nose, jaw and poll, but not to the mouth.

Uses of a bitless bridle vary, but may include the training green horses, use when a horse has a mouth injury or is otherwise unable or unwilling to carry a bitted bridle, and by personal preference of horse owners. Bitless designs are most often seen in endurance riding, trail riding, and some types of natural horsemanship, they are sometimes seen in other disciplines.

=== Use in competition ===
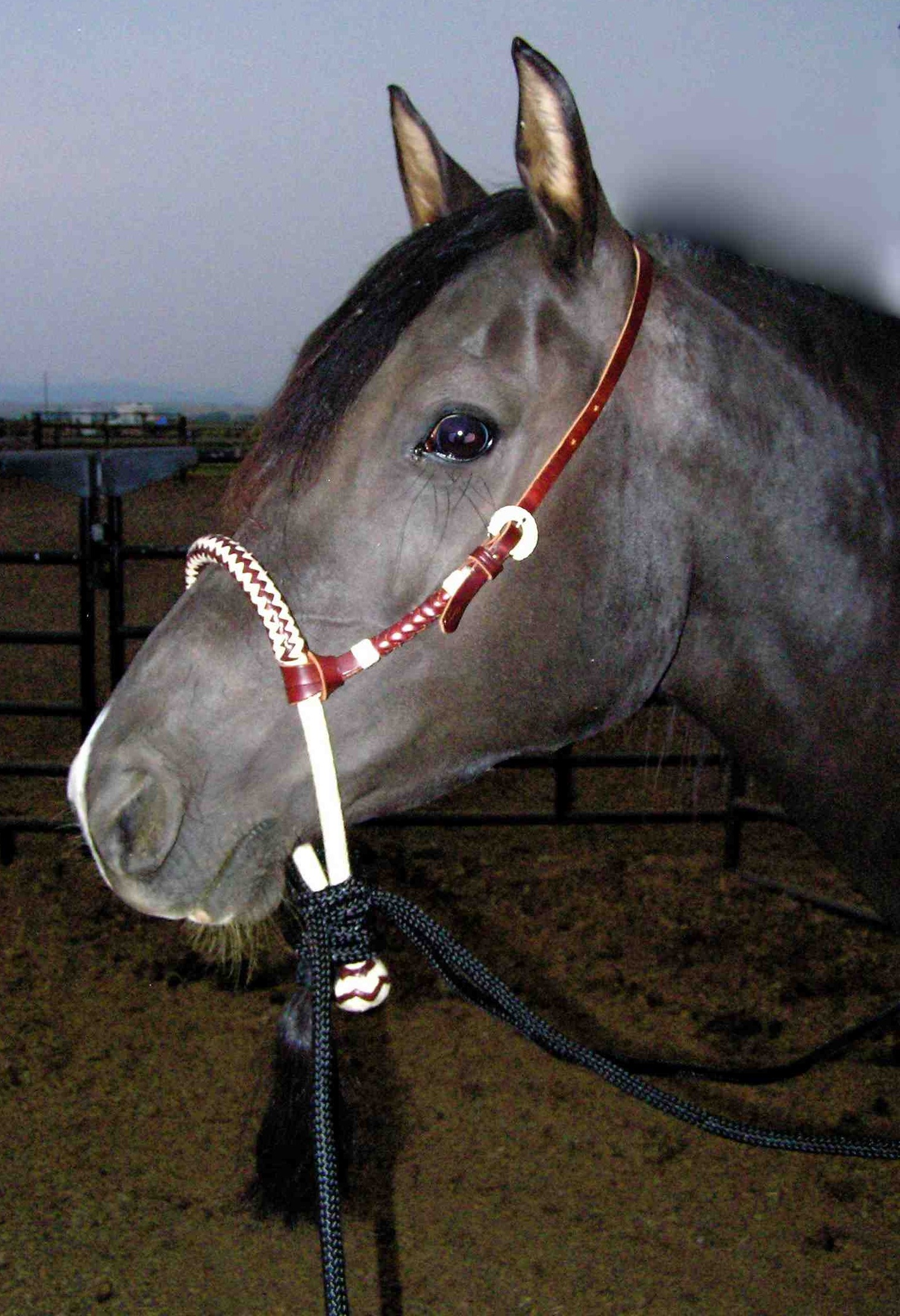
A classic bosal-style hackamore

While the bosal hackamore is allowed for "junior" horses (usually under 4–6 years old) in certain western-style events, bitless bridles and mechanical hackamores are not otherwise allowed in most types of competitions at horse shows other than some speed events. In English disciplines, hackamores and other bitless bridles are generally not allowed in dressage or English pleasure competition, are considered "unconventional tack" in hunter classes, but sometimes are legal and seen in show jumping and in eventing during the stadium and cross country segments. They are allowed in endurance riding, competitive trail riding, rodeos, and Gymkhana or "O-Mok-See" events. While advocates of bitless bridles have petitioned the USEF and other governing bodies to allow bitless bridles in sanctioned competition for a number of years, these efforts have not resulted in rule changes.

== Styles ==
There are many different styles of bitless headgear originating from bitted bridle and halter designs as well as from the ancient Persian hakma.

=== Hackamore family ===
==== Bosal style hackamore ====
The bosal-type hackamore (Spanish: jaquima) is a type of bitless headgear with the most ancient roots. The hackamore and its modern variants use a noseband of a set diameter, using pressure and release to provide control. It is most closely affiliated with the vaquero tradition of horse training, most commonly seen today in western riding for starting young horses. The hackamore is headgear that controls a horse without a bit, but to call it a "bitless bridle" is incorrect other than as a descriptive simile, as the hackamore predates all other modern bitless designs by several hundred years. and the English language term "hackamore" itself dates back at least 150 years.

==== Sidepull ====
A variant of the bosal design that is sometimes called a bitless bridle, but more often, incorrectly, placed within the hackamore family, is called a sidepull. It has a noseband, usually of rope, rawhide or heavy leather, with reins that attach at the cheekpieces. It offers significant lateral pressure but limited stopping control.

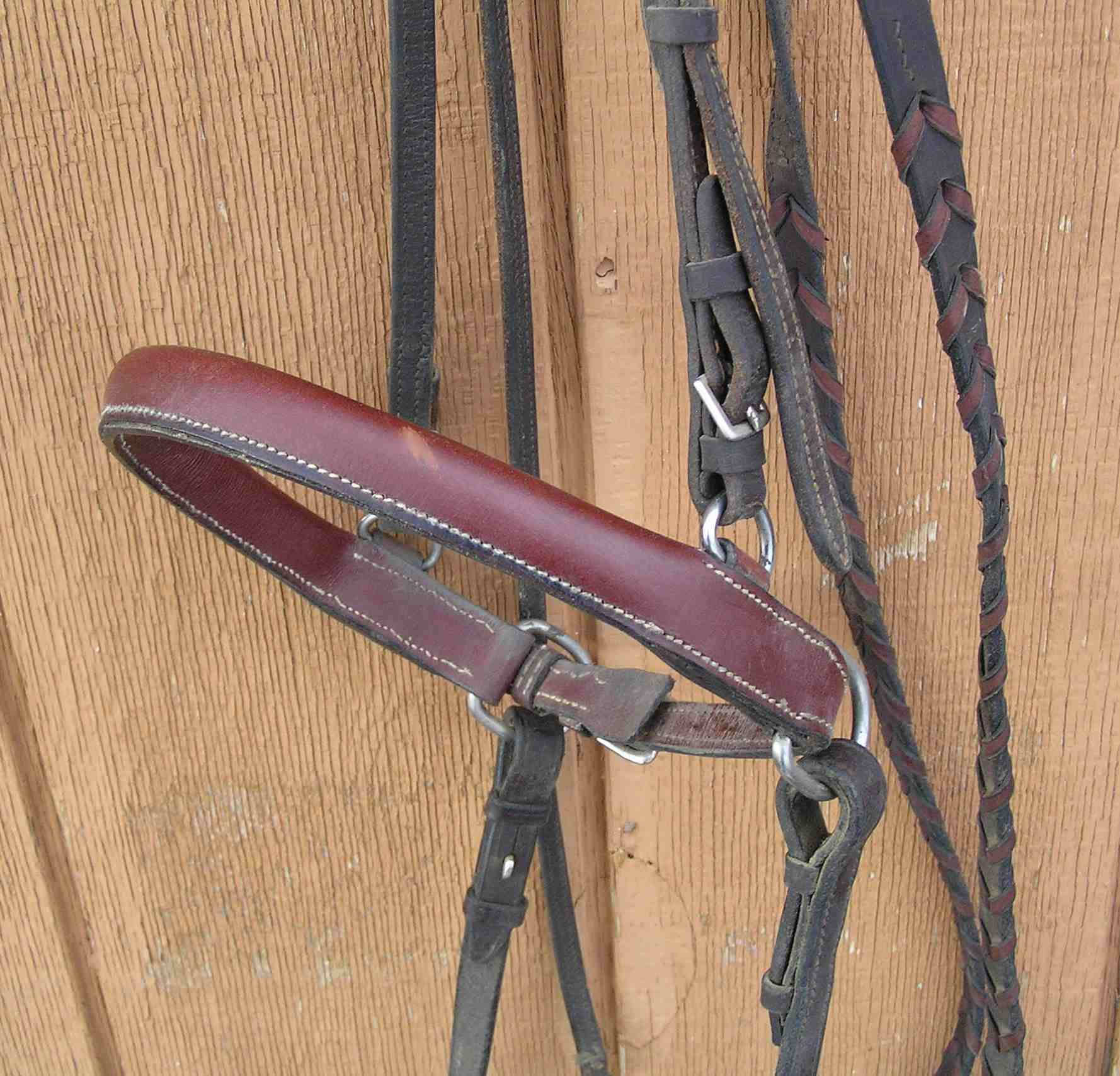
An English-style Jumping Cavesson

==== Jumping cavesson ====
The jumping cavesson, or jumping hackamore, seen in English riding, is a heavy noseband made of a cable covered with leather. It differs slightly from a sidepull in that the reins attach farther back, on either side of the jaw, rather than at the cheeks. It allows greater control of speed, but has less lateral direction than a sidepull. A related piece of equipment, called the longeing cavesson or lungeing cavesson, is not used for riding, but rather for longeing (US) (lungeing (UK)), long-lining the horse from the ground, and vaulting. It consists of a heavy noseband with rings at the top and cheeks, held on by a sturdy headstall that will not slip when pressure from the line is applied. Both designs have antecedents in the classic cavesson utilized by European masters such as William Cavendish, and can be dated to the 17th century, and probably earlier.

=== Cross-under family ===
Evidence of the concept of creating leverage by crossing the reins under a horse's jaw dates back just over 100 years. A bitted bridle with a cross-under design was patented by an individual with the surname McCleod in 1894 The first record of a cross-under bitless design that utilized nose, jaw, cheek and poll pressure, dates to the 1950s, about the same time that patents for the mechanical hackamore began to proliferate. It was developed by an individual with the last name of Grimsley, allegedly designed for a group of rodeo bulldoggers in New Jersey. In 1980, the crossunder principle was part of a design by an individual named Woodruff, who obtained a patent for a halter. The first cross-under bitless bridle that utilized jaw and poll pressure that was patented and filed with the U.S. Patent Office was a 1988 design credited to Edward Allan Buck. The "Dr. Cook bitless bridle" arises from the 1988 design, and the Cook design was patented in the United States in 2001. Another version of the cross-under jaw/poll pressure bitless bridle is called the Spirit Bridle.

The disadvantages of these designs are the long way the rein has to travel to apply pressure and the slow release, as the reins are guided through rings on the side and go back from there to the rider's hand. Even if the rider lets go of the reins quickly, the reins slide back slowly. The pressure on the cheek can also cause the horse to tilt its head to escape it.

==== Designs applying poll pressure ====
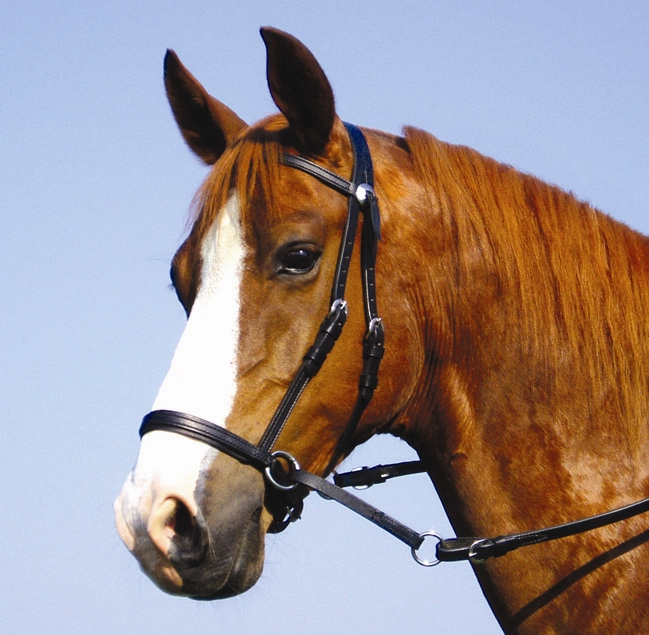
A cross-under bridle

In a cross-under bitless bridle, each rein connects to a strap that passes through a ring on the left side of the noseband and subsequently crosses under the horse's jaw and up the cheek on the opposite side, goes behind the ear and join the opposite rein at the poll. Thus, pressure is applied to the bridge of the nose as well as to the branches of the lower jaw, cheek and poll joint.

==== Designs lacking poll pressure ====
On the Scawbrig (United Kingdom) or Meroth (Germany) bitless bridles, the reins connect to a strap that passes through a ring on one side of a noseband, under the chin, and attaches to the opposite ring. Thus, pressure is applied only to the bridge of the nose and the chin but not to the branches of the lower jaw, cheek or poll.

=== Mechanical hackamores ===
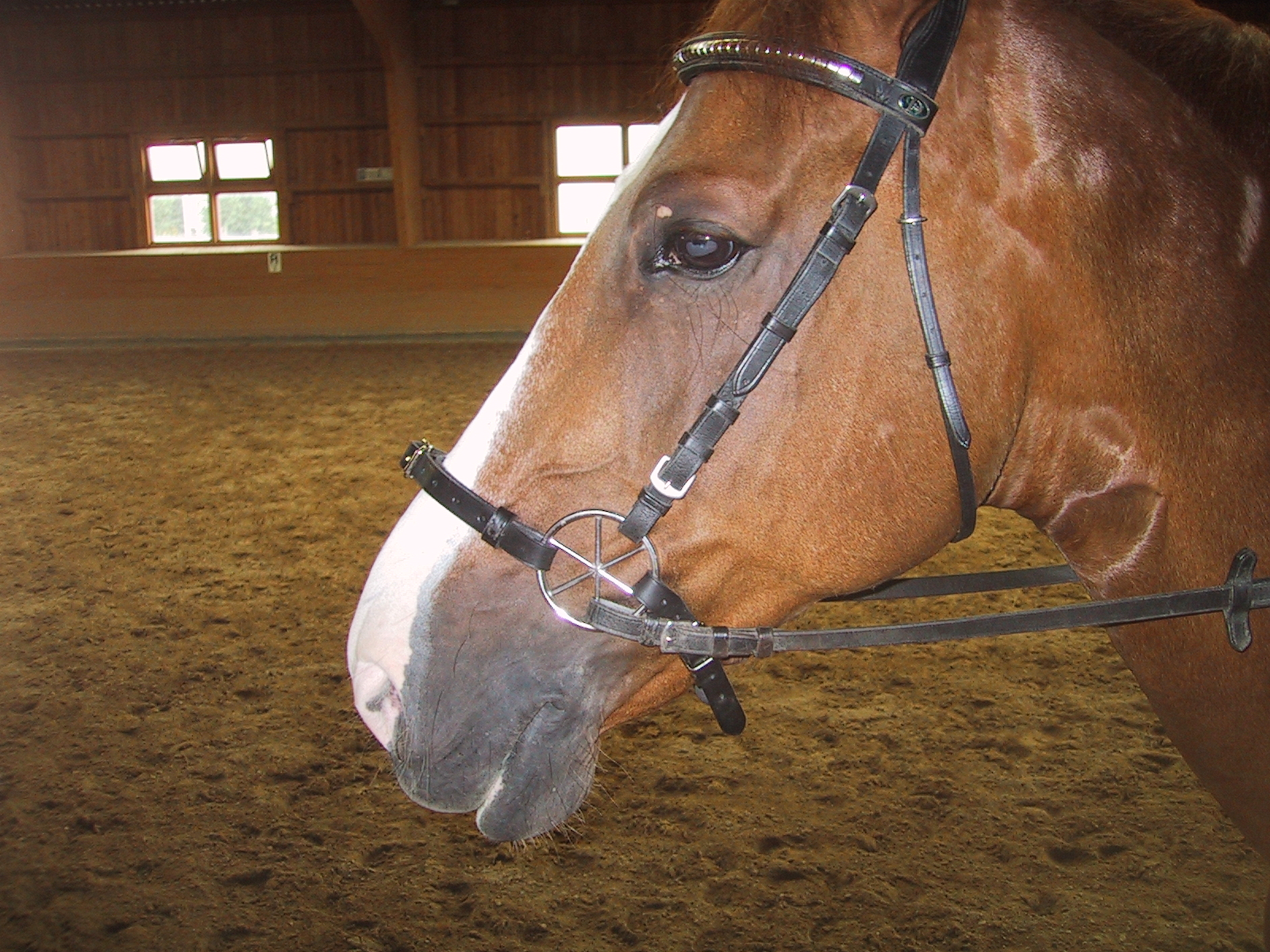
Gluecksrad or "LG" bridle

In a mechanical hackamore, also known as a hackamore bit, brockamore, and English hackamore, the reins attach to shanks (like bit shanks on a curb bit) that are attached between a noseband and a curb chain. As in a curb bit, the shanks apply pressure with leverage to the nose, jaw, and poll joint. This is not a true hackamore, nor a modern bitless bridle, but rather is a hybrid between a cavesson and a bitted bridle.

A European design, known as a "Wheel hackamore" or "LG bridle", uses metal loops from the headstall to the reins to add leverage, though with less force than the shanks of a traditional straight-shanked mechanical hackamore. It uses a metal wheel with six spokes, on which the headstall, noseband and chin strap are attached. The wheel turns slightly when the reins are drawn and creates some leverage, which makes it work like a very mild mechanical hackamore. There are different ways to create different levels of leverage. With a chin leather strap it has a mild effect, with double chain a stronger effect. It has a quick release that is thought to make this design less claustrophobic to the horse than a cross-under. Other types (in order of severity) include zero-shanked, short-shanked, curve-shanked, and straight-shanked, with many variations of each type available such as a flower hackamore, or a star hackamore.

=== Simple rope bridles ===
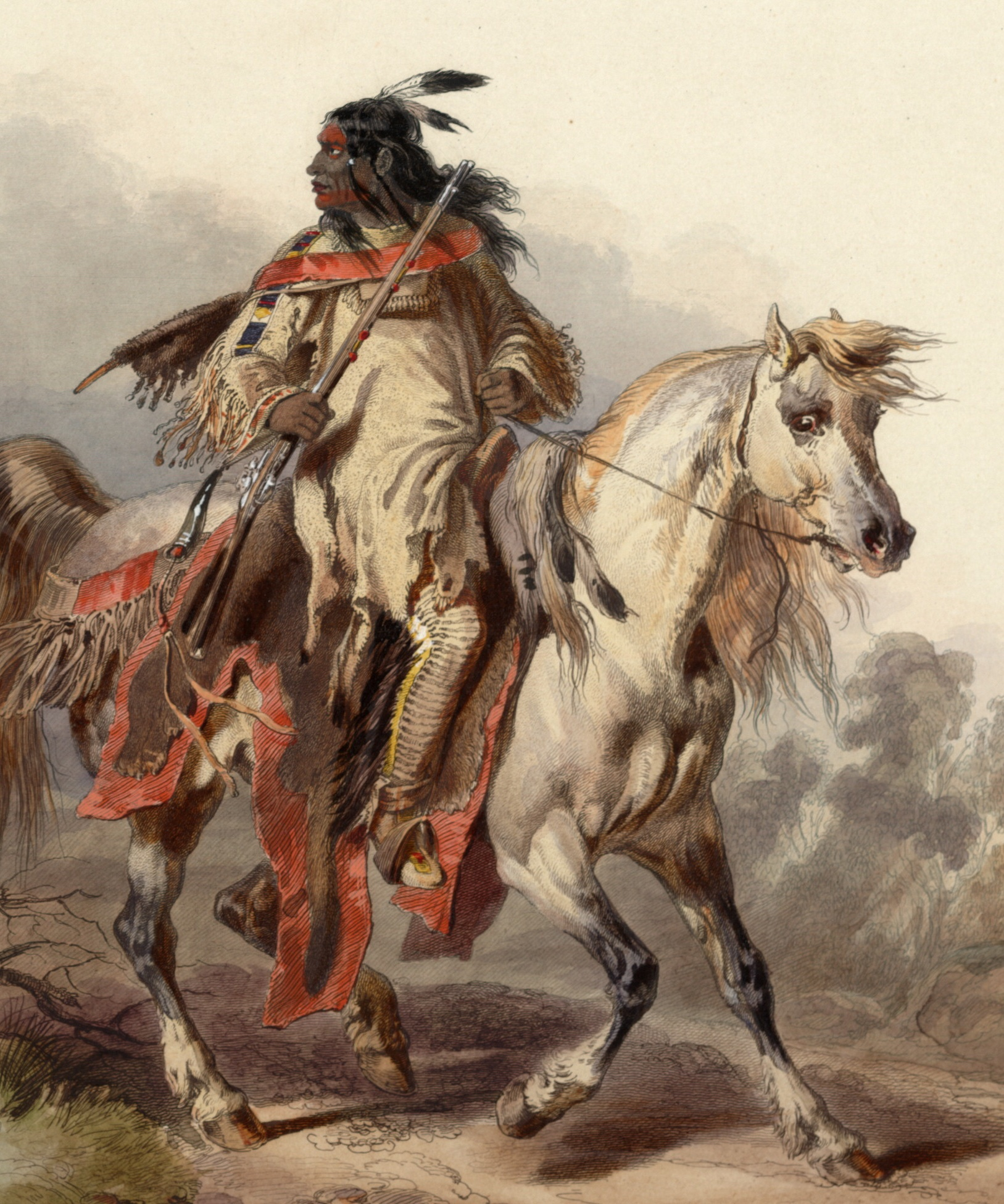
Blackfeet warrior riding with a ghost cord, illustration c. 1840–1843

A simple hackamore or bridle can be made of a thin rope in several styles. Used more in the past than today, these are sometimes described as emergency bridles. Some styles use nose pressure, but others run the rope through the horse's mouth; it is debated whether a rope design running through the mouth is classified as a bitted or bitless design. Any of these designs were at times called "war bridles", in part due to their close historic association with Native American cultures, but the term is used differently in modern times. (see war bridle below.)

A ghost cord, Cherokee bridle is a rope passed through the mouth and tied in a slip knot or half hitch under the chin groove. The ends of the rope serve as one or sometimes two reins. One authority describes this bridle as "in competent hands, an instrument of either mental diversion or extreme cruelty," historical illustrations and early photographs show it in wide use among Native Americans in the United States.

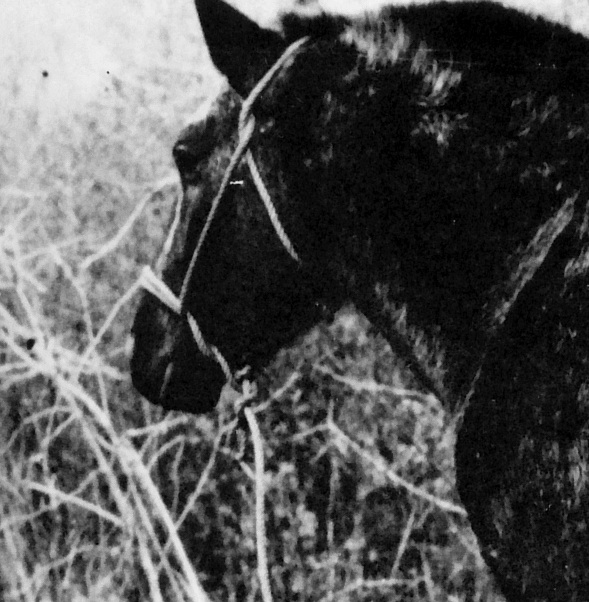
Simple rope bridle, c. 1895

Another style uses a single piece of rope that goes over the poll and is placed around the nose with a slipknot attachment, in some cases tightening when a rein is pulled. A third style has the rope run over the poll and through the mouth, tying with a square knot to serve as a type of bit, and leaving the ends as reins.

=== Riding in halters ===
Some rope halters, usually made of yacht rope, are designed to be used for riding horses by the addition of various design elements, such as knots on the top of the nose, rings for reins so that it acts like a sidepull, or a heavy bottom knot akin to that of a bosal. Communication is achieved by direct pressure on the nose. There is minimal, if any leverage, nor does a halter utilize any type of clamping action.

Some people also ride horses with an ordinary halter, though this is generally viewed as unsafe due to the lack of clear communication with the horse because of the halters padded design. Specialized training may be required in order for the rider to be able to communicate clearly enough with the horse when riding in a halter. They are also not allowed in recognized competitions, save for competitive trail riding and endurance riding.

=== War bridle ===
A modern war bridle is a thin cord run over the poll and then either through the mouth or under the upper lip, against the gumline of the upper incisors. In some cases, the lower loop goes around the horse's muzzle rather than under the lip. A loop is used so that it tightens on the horse's head when the end of the line is pulled. Sometimes a pulley is used to provide mechanical advantage. All designs tightens on both the poll and the lip or jaw. The war bridle is not intended for riding; it is used on the ground for management of an animal. The use of a war bridle is considered by some to be a last resort for handling an uncontrollable animal, but others claim its use constitutes animal cruelty.

== Controversies ==
The advantages of bitless over bitted headgear is hotly disputed. Hackamores and other bitless headgear are commonly used to start young horses, particularly if the horse is started at a time when a young horse's permanent teeth are emerging and the animal may therefore have issues with a bit in its mouth. Most traditional schools of horse training transition a young horse into a bit after a year or so. However, some promoters of bitless bridles encourage their use for the life of the horse, and a few go so far as to suggest that a bit may cause physical as well as mental problems in the horse. However, advocates of traditional bridles note that like any piece of horse headgear, a bitless bridle in the wrong hands can also inflict pain. Another significant problem with a bitless bridle is that collection and being "on the bit", such as is required in dressage, is more difficult - though this could be considered a good thing, as the rider is unable to force a desired head carriage. Another problem is that any movement of the horse's head laterally may have to be requested by the rider through unsophisticated "plow reining", or large hand or arm movements.If a horse is correctly trained to respond to a bitless bridle, however, this should not be a problem.

== See also ==
- Horse tack
- Bridle
- Bit (horse)
- Hackamore
- Mechanical hackamore
- Horse pain caused by the bit
