= Shadow roll =

Horse racing headgear for horses

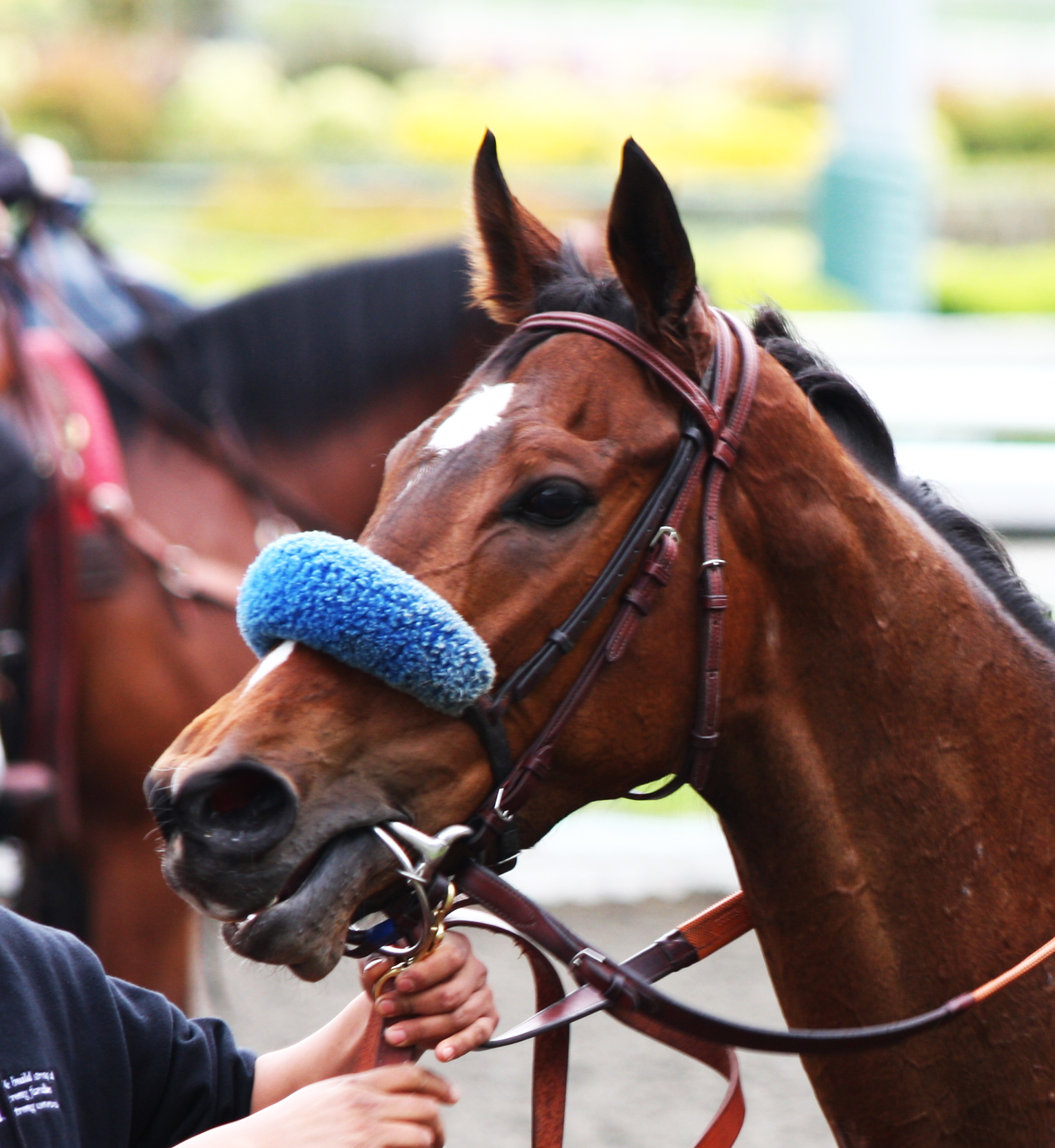
A racehorse with a shadow roll (in blue)

A shadow roll is a piece of equipment, usually made of sheepskin or a synthetic material, that is attached to the noseband of a horse's bridle. Like blinkers, it partially restricts the horse's vision, and helps them to concentrate on what is in front of them, rather than objects on the ground (such as shadows).

Shadow rolls are most commonly used in horse racing, both on the flat and harness racing, as some horses will try to jump shadows on the ground, behavior that will slow them down. They are also occasionally, albeit rarely, seen in eventing. The shadow roll is also seen in show jumping competitions, especially for horses who have a tendency to raise their heads too high and evade the bit. The shadow roll is intended to correct this by forcing the horse to lower his head in order to see the jump; when the horse's head is raised the roll blocks his vision.
