= Grackel =

The word Grackel can refer to different things

- A noseband used in equestrianism.
- A spelling variation of Grackle, a bird genus native to North America.
