= Noseband =

Horse tack

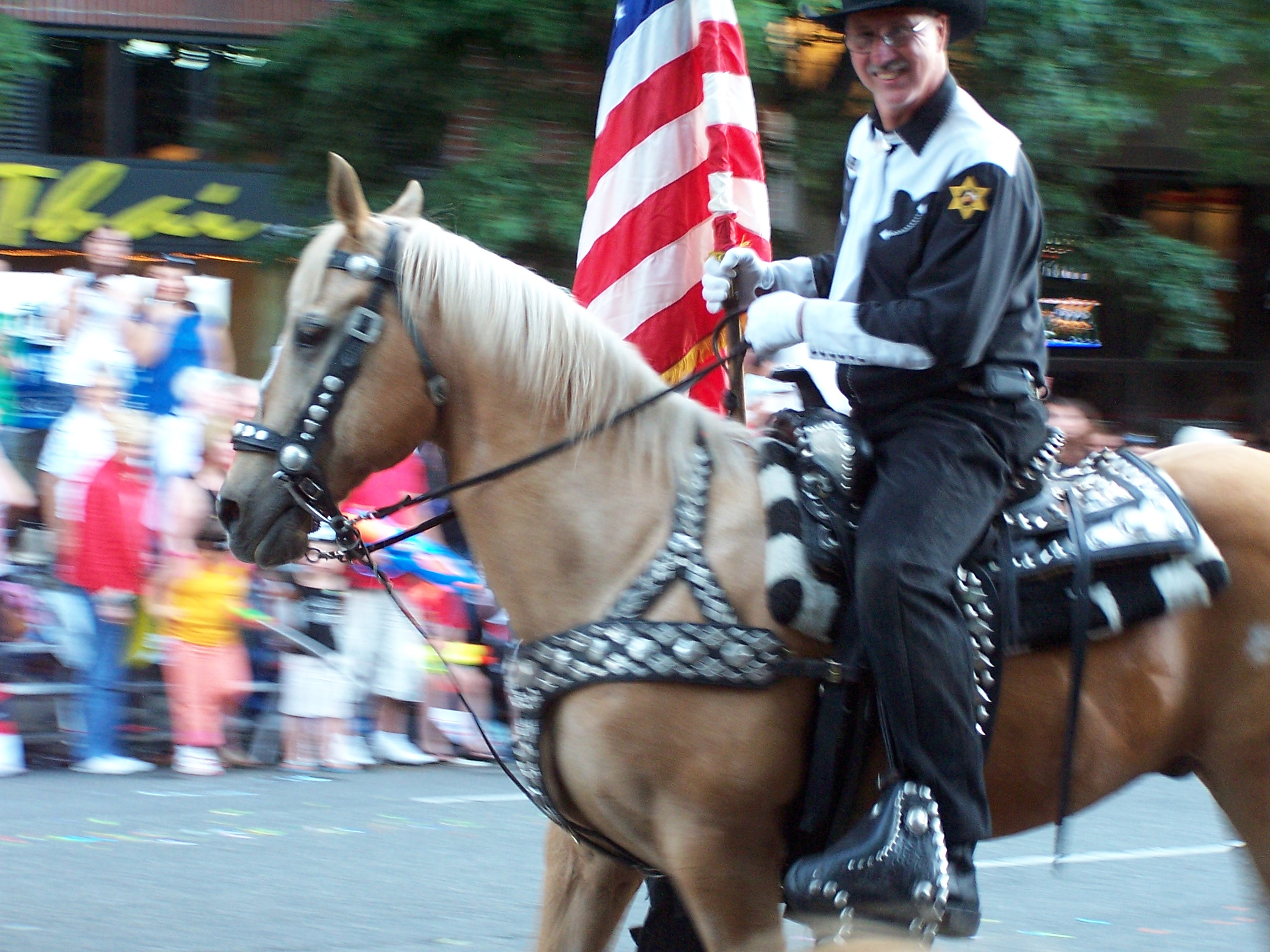
Parade horse regalia, showing a noseband attached to a bridle, an example of a noseband used primarily for style, though it also is the point of attachment for a standing martingale.

A noseband is the part of a horse's bridle that encircles the nose and jaw of the horse. In English riding, where the noseband is separately attached to its own headstall or crownpiece, held independently of the bit, it is often called a cavesson or caveson noseband. In other styles of riding, a simple noseband is sometimes attached directly to the same headstall as the bit.

== Development ==
A noseband may have been one of the first tools used by humans to domesticate and ride horses. The bit developed later.

The noseband was originally made of leather or rope. After the invention of the bit, the noseband was, in some cultures, demoted to a halter worn beneath the bridle that allowed the rider to remove the bit from the horse's mouth after work and leave a restraining halter on underneath, or to tie the horse by this halter, instead of by the bit, which could result in damage to the horse's mouth if it panicked. However, its ability to hold a horse's mouth shut over the bit was also recognized, as was its usefulness for attaching equipment such as a martingale, and so in some traditions it was sometimes left as a working part of a bridle. Still other cultures, such as that of Ancient Persia, developed the noseband as a tool for training young horses, called a hakma and this training noseband evolved into modern equipment such as today's bosal-style hackamore and Longeing cavesson.

Today, there are also many styles of bitless bridle that rely on a noseband as the main method of communication and control.

== Uses ==
Today, the noseband has several uses:

- First, to give a balanced and traditionally correct appearance to the horse's turnout at shows. When raised high, it can make a long-nosed horse's face look shorter and more proportional. Various positions up and down the nose may help the face look more handsome, and a wide noseband can make a heavy head appear more delicate.
- Second, to keep the horse's mouth closed or prevent a horse from evading the bit by opening the mouth too far. It can sometimes prevent the horse from putting its tongue over the bit and avoiding pressure in that manner.
- Third, the noseband is also used to help stop a horse from pulling. A correctly-fitted noseband can be used instead of a stronger bit, which makes it a valuable option for riders that want more control, but do not want to back their horse off, that is, to make the horse afraid to go forward, especially when jumping, which is often a consequence when the horse is placed in a strong/harsh bit.
- Fourth, it can be an attachment for other equipment, such as a standing martingale or shadow roll.
- It can also valuable for young horses just learning to go "on the bit", as it supports the jaw and helps the horse to relax its masseter muscle, and flex softly at the poll.
- In some riding styles, a noseband is added simply for decoration and is not attached to the bridle or adjusted to serve any useful purpose.

There is a correlation between the sensitivity of a noseband and the amount of tension needed in the reins to obtain a response from the horse. In a 2011 study of horses being ridden in English riding equipment with the noseband in one of three adjacent adjustments, greater rein tension was needed to get a response from the horses when they had the looser adjustment. However, the study did not go on to examine the effects of no noseband at all or a very tight adjustment. Thus, nosebands may add some pressure to the nose when the reins are applied, depending on adjustment, style and the degree to which the horse resists the bit. With a soft leather noseband on a well-trained horse, the effect is minimal.

A bridle does not necessarily need a noseband, and many bridles, such as those used in Western riding, flat racing, or endurance riding, do not have one. Some horses shown in-hand do not use a noseband in order to better show off the animal's head. Many old paintings also depict a hunting horse without a noseband, since it was not always deemed useful by certain riders.

However, even in disciplines such as western riding, where it is considered a sign of a polished horse to not require a noseband or cavesson, one is often used on horses in training as a precaution to help prevent the horse from learning bad habits such as opening the mouth and evading the bit.

== Types of English riding nosebands ==
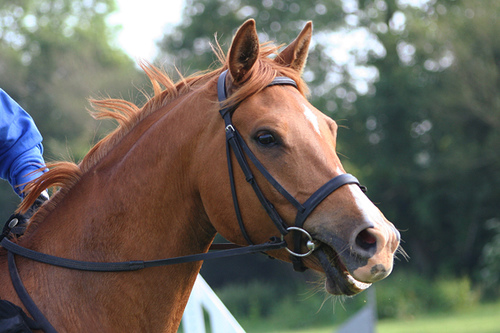
Classic English-style Cavesson Noseband

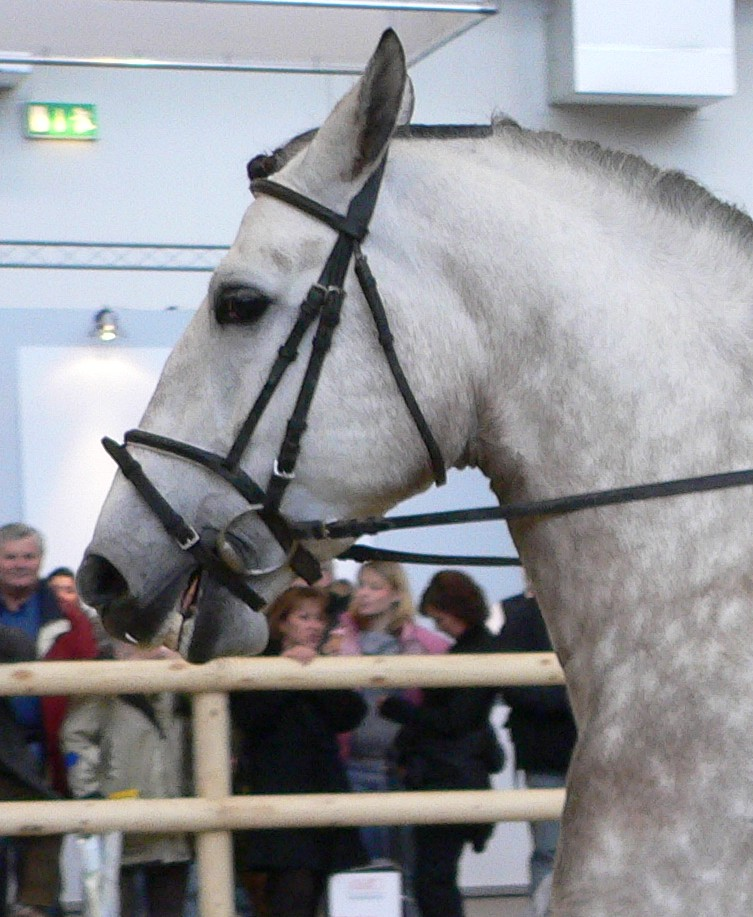
Flash noseband

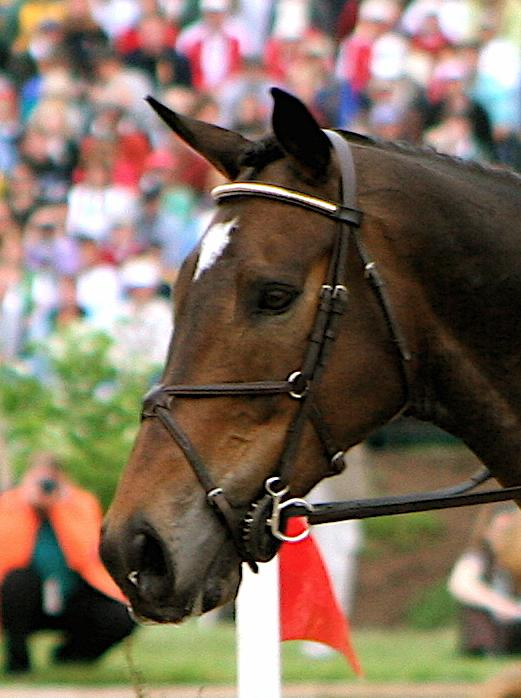
Figure-eight noseband.

In the English riding disciplines, the most common design of cavesson noseband is the Plain or French cavesson, a noseband that encircles the nose 1–2 inches below the cheekbone. This type of noseband is seen in most English disciplines, especially in dressage, show hunters, saddle seat, equitation and field hunters, but is the basic noseband for all disciplines. This noseband comes in various styles from a plain flat leather suitable for hunting, to raised, double raised, fancy stitched, colored and padded styles. All of them perform the same purpose.

Other designs include:

- Aachen or Flash noseband: The flash was originally developed for show jumping riders, so they could close the mouth lower down in addition to having an appropriate noseband for a standing martingale. However, modern research has shown that even when a flash noseband is "correctly" tightened to allow two fingers between the noseband and the horses skin, the horse is unable to swallow properly A common misconception of this noseband is that it stabilises the bit in the horses mouth, but this would only work with a certain bit and an overtightened noseband and cheekpiece, so for a more stable bit, a fixed cheek option could be used instead. The noseband is similar to the plain cavesson in that the top part encircles the nose 1-2 inches below the cheekbone, but it also includes a second strap that runs from the cavesson, around the nose in front of the bit and under the chin groove, then coming back around to the cavesson. This second piece is used to help keep the horse's mouth closed and, while rumored to stop the horse from crossing his jaw, this is not the case unless the noseband is so tight that the horse cannot breathe. A flash noseband may be used with a standing martingale when the martingale is attached to the cavesson piece. This noseband is usually seen at the lower levels of dressage, or in the dressage phase of eventing.

The flash nose band was named for King George III's horse Bold Flash. It was developed by a stable hand to increase King George's control over his mount.

- Crank noseband or Swedish Cavesson: used most often on dressage horses at levels where a double bridle is worn, this noseband is similar to the plain cavesson except it has a leveraged buckle design that may be adjusted very tight, so as to force the horses mouth shut. Double bridles cannot use flash or drop cavessons, so the crank is usually seen on upper level dressage horses who will not keep the mouth shut, usually due to discomfort. It is also used occasionally on show hunters and hunt seat equitation horses. If adjusted so the horse can't open its jaw at all when the crank is tight, the horse cannot relax its jaw, swallow, or sometimes not breath properly. Additionally, it can push the cheeks against the horse's teeth when overtightened, which is painful.
- Drop noseband: Invented by the Spanish Riding School, this noseband encircles the nose around the chin groove, as opposed to just below the cheekbone, with the strap on the nasal bone, and never below it. It reminds the horse to keep its mouth closed and prevents the horse from crossing the jaw. Due to its position on the lower part of the face, it should never be used with a standing martingale. A drop noseband is also not suitable for galloping work, as it tends to restrict the nostrils if it is fitted incorrectly. Although the drop used to be very popular in dressage, it is very rarely seen today, partly because many riders dislike the look it gives the horse's head. However, many horses prefer the drop noseband to the flash, and it is a very useful piece of equipment.
- Figure-eight: Also called a crossed, Grackle or Mexican noseband, this noseband crosses from the top of the cheekbone on one side, over the nose to the chin groove on the other side, under the horse's chin, and back up to the opposite cheekbone. It is used to keep the horses mouth closed and may prevent him from crossing his jaw, and its design provides more expansion of the nostrils, which is preferable for horses performing work involving galloping (eventing, polo, racing), and has always been popular in show jumping. Many people believe that this type of noseband is more comfortable than a flash.
- Hanoverian: Also called a "crank with flash" this is the same as a flash noseband, but with the addition of a padded jawband like a crank noseband has. It operates to hold the horse's mouth shut and hold the bit steady in the horse's mouth. It is very commonly found on dressage bridles.
- Kineton or Puckle: Named for the English town of Kineton, and originating in horse racing for animals uncontrollable at high speeds, this noseband is considered rather severe. It transfers bit pressure from the rider's hand to the nose. The Kineton has metal half-rings that pass under the bit, and a leather strap that sits below the bit and over the nose (which it does not encircle) about where a drop noseband would cross. There is no strap to keep the horse's mouth closed. This noseband should only be used with a snaffle bit and without a martingale. It is most commonly seen in eventing on the cross-country phase, and in show jumping. This noseband allows the rider to ride lightly with a mild bit and still stop a strong horse. (Note - the cause of a horse being strong may be a lack of training on the ground (groundwork), or possibly pain, meaning the horse is attempting to run away from the pain)
- Lever or combination noseband: this noseband has a half-moon piece of metal that goes on each side of the horse's face. On the "top" end of the curve (near the horse's cheek bone), a piece of leather is attached that runs under the jaw and attaches to the other side of the face. At the peak of the curve is a piece of leather that runs over the top of nose in a position slightly lower from where a regular cavesson would cross. At the "bottom" of the curve, a third piece of leather goes under the chin groove of the horse. This noseband is similar in design to the figure-eight, and works similarly by preventing the horse from crossing his jaws (which is especially helped by the metal on either side of the face). Unlike the figure-eight, it does not stabilize the bit and it tends to push the cheeks in against the horse's molars which can be painful.
- Worcester noseband: This noseband is based on the cavesson, but has a second narrower strap sewn in an inverted V shape to the front, which attaches directly to the bit on each side. This transfers some of the pressure from the reins to the nose, and is a less severe noseband than the Kineton, while still giving more control on a strong horse than a plain cavesson.

== Training designs ==
Noseband and cavessons generally used only for training, or ground handling, include:

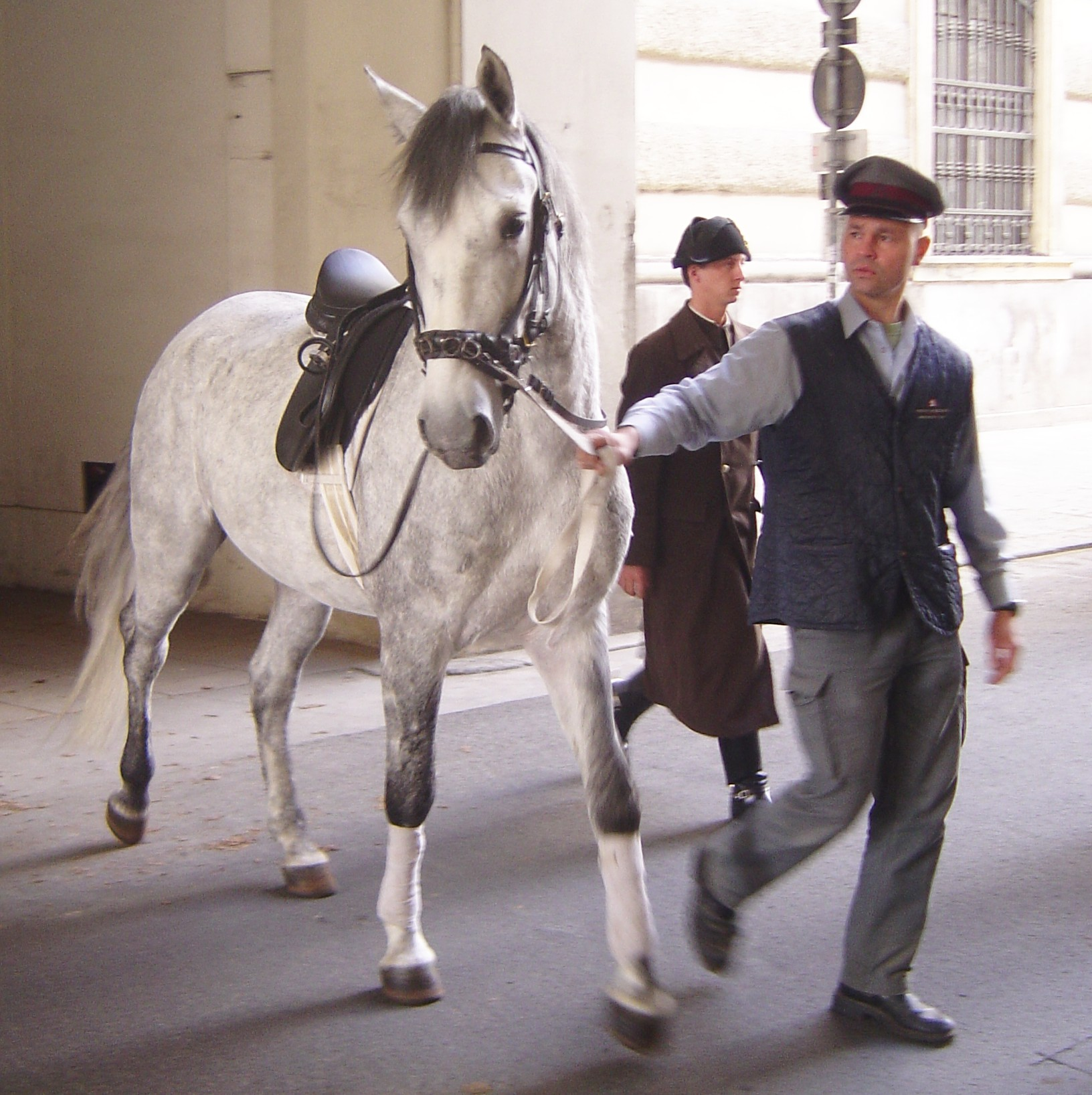
A young horse in a longeing cavesson

- Longeing cavesson (UK: "Lungeing") is a piece of equipment used in longeing a horse, made of leather or nylon web. Though the longeing cavesson looks a bit like a halter, the noseband can be tightened and rings are strategically placed on the sides and at the front of the nose for attachment of a longe line or side reins. It provides much better leverage and more precise control of a horse in ground training, yet it is a relatively gentle piece of equipment.

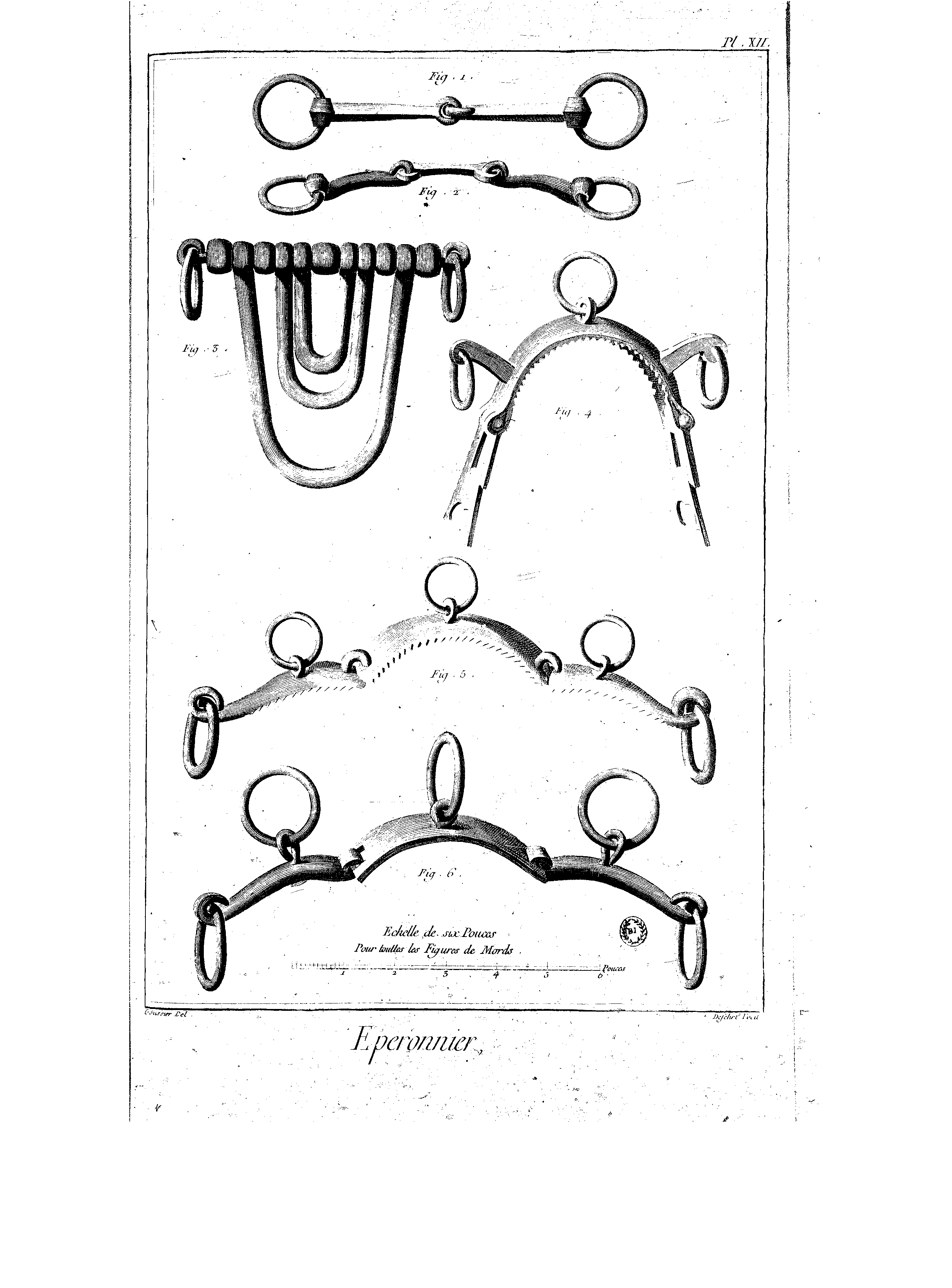
Illustration including three serreta nosebands

- Serreta: A type of noseband built into a halter or bridle, made of metal and usually with one or three rings protruding outward. Because it is heavy, it commonly is supported with a frentera. The serreta sometimes is studded inside. It is most commonly seen in the Iberian Peninsula and Hungary.
- Spanish noseband: A Spanish noseband is essentially a cavesson which has round or sharp studs on the inside. It is most common in Iberia, especially on young horses, so as not to "spoil" their mouths, and in Austria and Hungary. They have also been adopted in other disciplines as a means of controlling a difficult horse, or as a training shortcut, but they are generally illegal in most horse show competition, and widely considered abusive. Blunt studs have a relatively mild effect. Sharp studs, like a serrated knife, are extremely painful and can cut the horse. When used while riding, they act with the normal action of the noseband, which applies pressure to the nose when the horse fails to respond to the bit, and increases the effect of this pressure.

== Western designs ==
In western riding, nosebands are not generally worn with an ordinary working bridle. Nosebands attached to the cheekpieces of the bridle, used purely for decorative purposes, were popular during the 1950s and in many western movies, but are not common today. When nosebands are used with western equipment, they usually fall into one of three categories:

1. A relatively strong noseband, often on its own headstall, may be worn for the purpose of supporting a standing martingale or tiedown. It is generally adjusted to lie just below the cheekbones, but is adjusted loosely or may not be adjustable. It does not keep the horse's mouth shut, it only supports the tiedown.
2. Nosebands are used in training. Some young horses are started in a hackamore that includes a specialized design of rawhide noseband called a bosal, to which reins are attached. As a trained hackamore horse advances into a bit, a lightweight bosal, sometimes called a "pencil bosal" may be kept on the bridle, with or without a separate set of reins. On young horses started in a snaffle bit, some western trainers use a light rope or pencil bosal as a loose noseband to prevent the horse from gaping its mouth to avoid the bit. It is adjusted loosely, but the material is more stiff and unyielding than leather. On hot or sensitive horses, a standard plain cavesson similar to that used on English bridles may be used instead.
3. There are various designs of bitless bridles that incorporate nosebands in lieu of a bit for control, including the sidepull and the mechanical hackamore.

== Fitting ==
Different styles of noseband are fitted according to their purpose. A horse must be able to part its teeth and open its mouth slightly (not visible on the outside) in order to flex correctly at the jaw, relax and come onto the bit. An excessively tight noseband will prevent this. If a horse cannot relax its jaw, it will have problems with proper head carriage, and the rider may then try to force the horse into position by pulling back on the reins or using artificial leverage devices. Some effects of an overtightened noseband are: The horse being unable to breathe properly, the horse being unable to swallow properly, the horse becoming stressed, damage to the nasal bone.

Standard adjustment of a noseband is to allow one or two fingers between the noseband and the nasal bone of the horse's head, though many riders adjust it tighter. Research is ongoing to determine stress and pain levels related to excessively tight nosebands. Recent studies in equitation science now strongly recommend that traditional and crank nosebands be adjusted so that two fingers can be inserted at the "nasal midline"—where the noseband crosses the top of the nose. The International Society for Equitation Science has stated that tight nosebands may lead to physiological stress and mask unwanted behavior and they encourage competition rules to be amended to require horse show stewards to check noseband tightness with a standardized gauge and see that competitors adjust their equipment accordingly.

- French or plain cavesson: The headstall is adjusted so that the noseband sits roughly equidistant between the prominent cheek bone and the horse's lips. Around the nose and jaw, this cavesson should be fitted so that, depending on the size of the horse and the size of the rider's hand, one or two fingers can be easily inserted between the noseband and the top of the nose.
- Drop: This style is fitted with the strap and buckle fastening below the bit in the chin groove. Care should be taken not to allow the top part to rest below the nasal bone – if it presses on the soft tissue below this bone it can impede breathing. In general, a drop noseband is fitted so that a finger can be placed between the front and the nasal bone.
- Flash: The upper cavesson is adjusted somewhat tighter than a plain cavesson to prevent it from being pulled toward the end of the muzzle by the lower flash strap. The lower flash strap runs below the bit and under the chin groove. It is buckled so the remainder of the strap points downwards.
- Crank: Opinions vary on the adjustment of this style. Some believe it should be extremely tight, to prevent the horse from opening or crossing its jaws. Others think tight cavessons mask undesirable behavior, recommending the traditional adjustment of one or two fingers to pass between the noseband and the top of the nose. Recent studies by the International Society for Equitation Science discourage extremely tight adjustment of any noseband and recommend a "two fingers" adjustment to all nosebands in competition.

== See also ==
- Bridle
- Hackamore
- Horse tack
- Bitless bridle
