= Longeing cavesson =

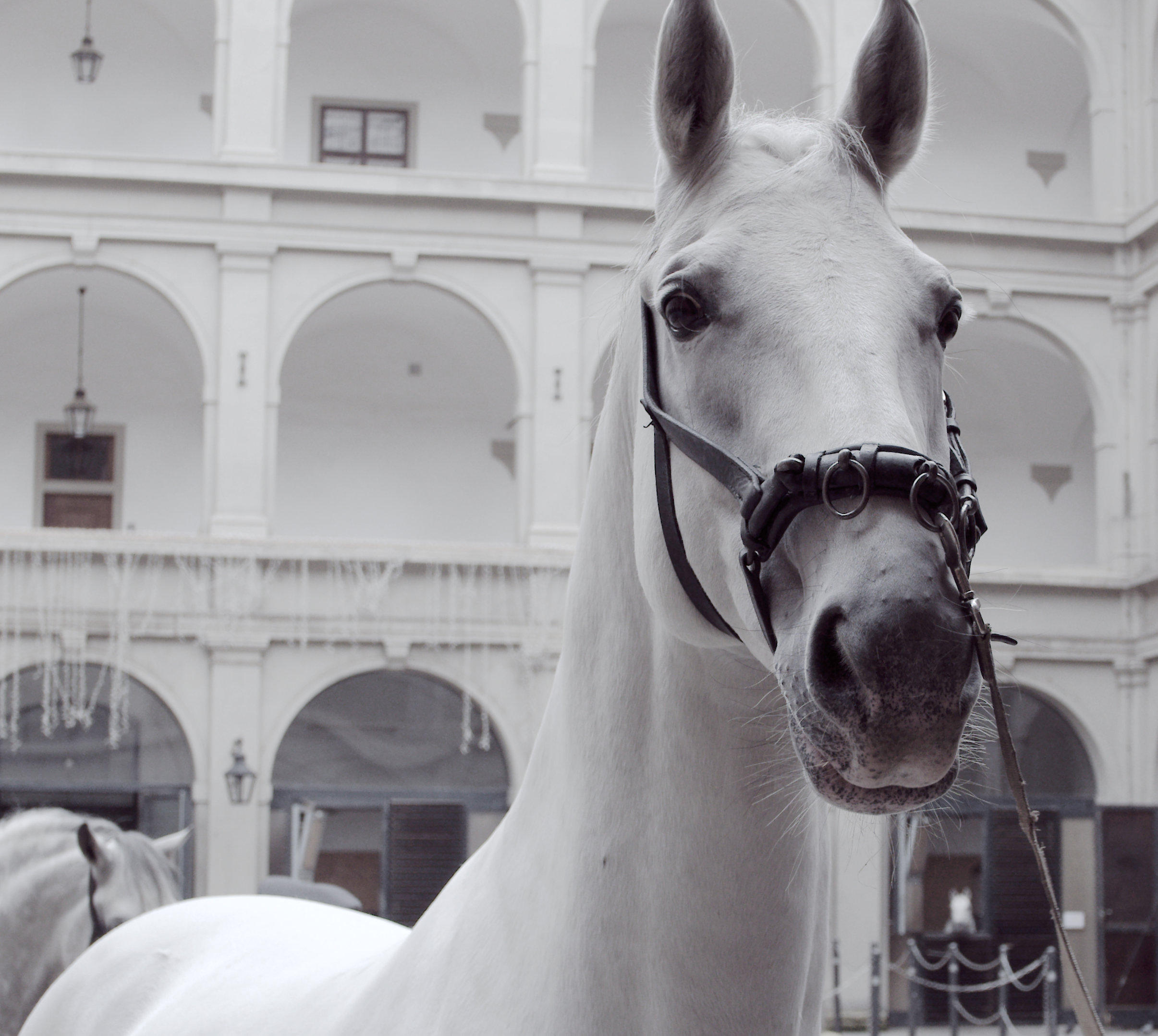
Longeing cavesson

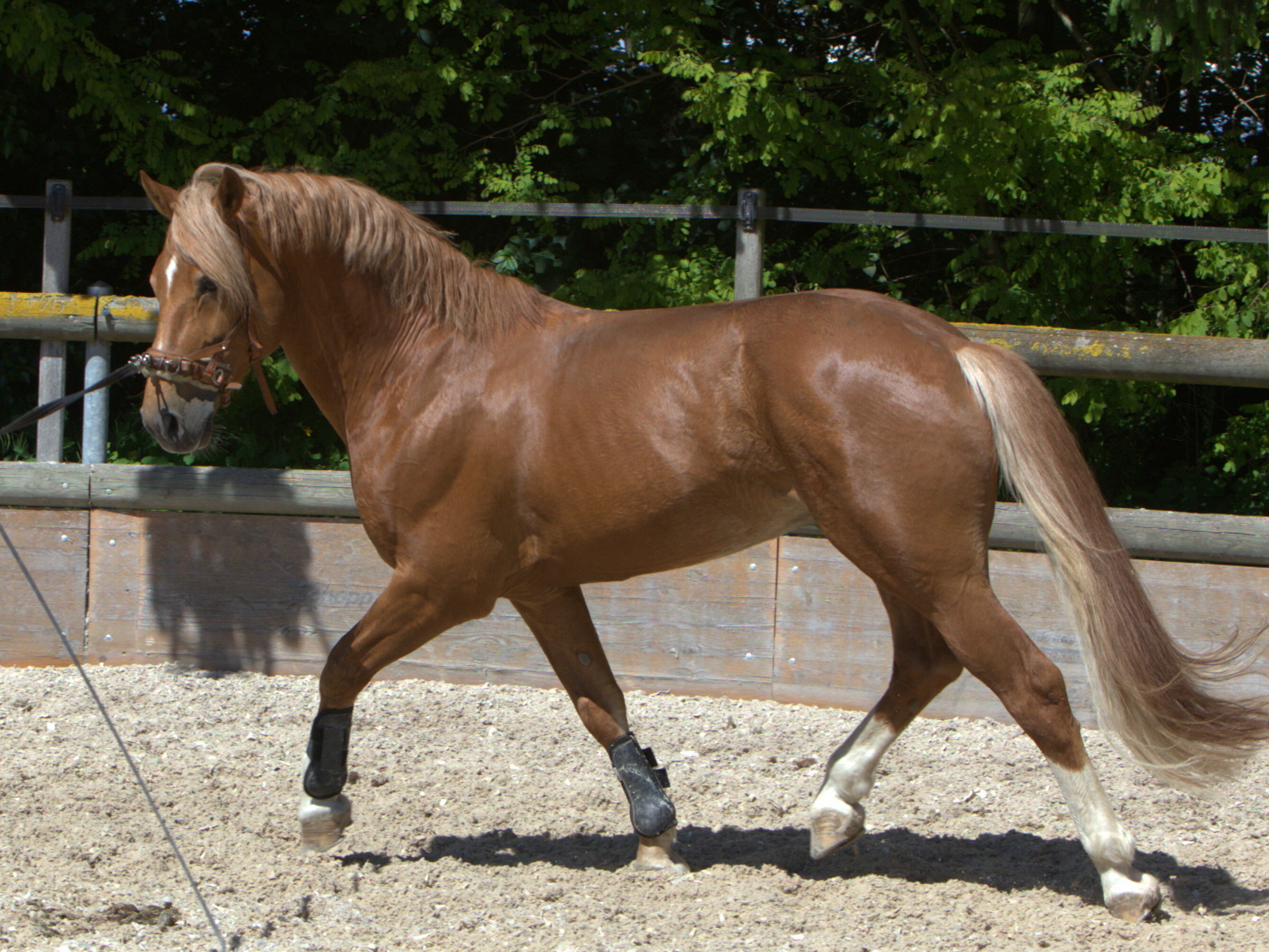
Longeing with a cavesson

A longeing cavesson (UK English: lungeing) is a piece of equipment used when longeing a horse. A longeing cavesson consists of a heavy, padded noseband, metal rings to attach the longe line, a throatlatch, and sometimes additional straps such as a jowl strap or a browband for added stability. It is placed on the horse's head in a manner somewhat akin to a halter, but provides significantly more control than a halter, without placing pressure on the horse's mouth as a bridle would. The noseband should be just below the cheekbone, several inches above the nostrils sitting on the nasal bone, and fitted snugly. The jowl strap should be very snug to prevent the cavesson from slipping into the horse's eye.

The key feature of a longeing cavesson is the strategic placement of rings for varying places to attach the longe line: one at the top of the nasal bone and one each side of the noseband. Many other types of headgear may be used for longeing, but the longeing cavesson is most commonly associated with dressage and related training methods and is designed to allow more subtle communication between handler and horse.

A longeing cavesson may be used with a snaffle bridle. The cavesson is put on under the bridle, with the noseband of the cavesson under the bridle cheekpieces. On some horses, the bridle cheekpieces may need to be lengthened to allow this. If the bridle also has its own cavesson, it may need to be removed to reduce bulk and avoid interference with other components.

== See also ==
- Bridle
- Halter
