= Frentera =

Horse tack element

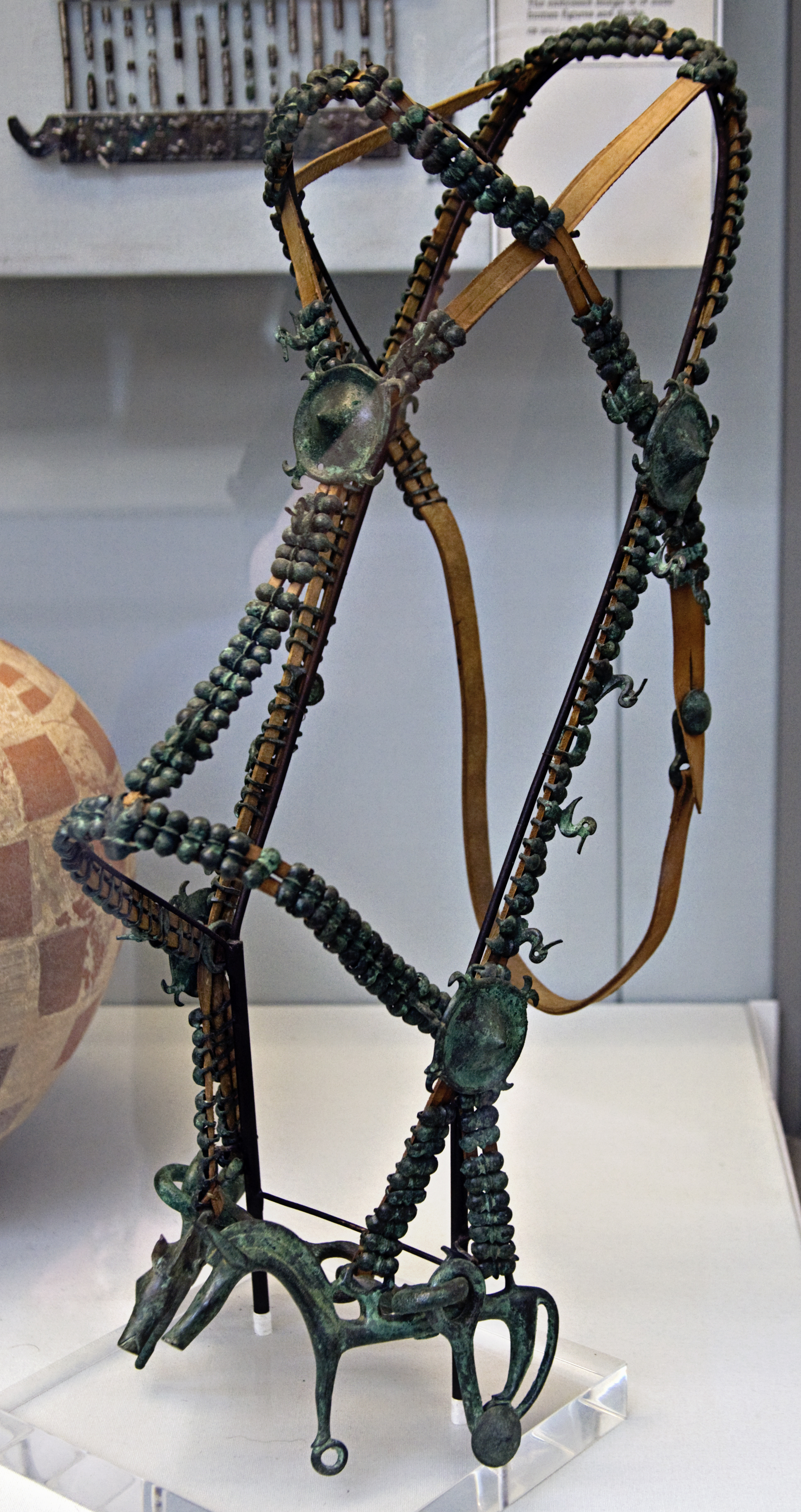
Frentera on bridle in the British museum, Etruscan, c. 700-650 BC

A frentera is a part of some halters and bridles, usually on a horse. It is a cord, strap, or chain on the face of the horse that is attached to the crownpiece or browband and runs down the horse's face to the noseband or bit rings. A frentera can be split at the top to pass on either side of the forelock, or on either side of the ears. In the latter case, the frentera usually substitutes for a browband. A frentera can also be split at the bottom into two or more parts to support and stabilize a heavy noseband or bit.

The known history of the frentera dates back to Ancient Greece, possibly earlier, and the frentera is in use today in Europe, Asia, Australia, and South America. When it includes a disk or sheet of metal, often silver, it is known in English as a testera (Spanish loanword), chamfron (French loanword), or faceplate.

Equipment with a similar purpose of stabilizing a bit or noseband include the forelock hanger (North America), bit lifter (Australia), and cheekers (Australia). The frentera is not to be confused with a similar appearing piece of tack, the overcheck.

== History ==
In the Alexander Mosaic, circa 200 BC, both Greek and Persian horses wear frentera, in two different styles. Some horses of the Terracotta Army (China, 210 BC) wear a bridle with a split-top frentera. Stiff, padded and studded testera have been found in Scythian tombs.

More recently, in the 19th century frentera were used on cavalry horses of several nations, including Germany, and today are used in cavalry ceremonies in Argentina.

== Current use ==
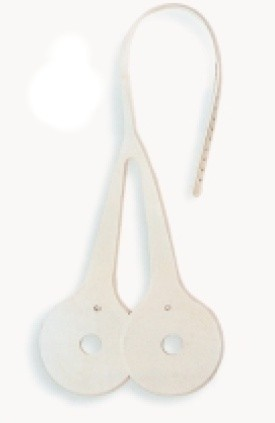
Cheekers

Today, the frentera is seldom seen in English speaking countries but widely used elsewhere in the world. It is used in Spain and Portugal on serreta bridles, in Hungary on similar bridles, and in Argentina and adjacent countries on both halters and bridles.

In Argentina, the frentera is an integral part of both utilitarian halters and parade bridles. The parade bridles often are chapeado, even made entirely of chains of sheet metal (often silver) heavily decorated with repoussé and chasing work. The frentera may be attached to the browband, passed between the ears to the crownpiece, or passed below (outside) the ears to the cheek pieces or fiador. If a halter and bridle are worn together, typically only one of them will have a frentera. In the English-speaking world, an ornamental frentera is seen occasionally on some parade horses.

== Related equipment ==
Several items of specialty horse tack of a utilitarian nature are related to the frentera. On an Australian polo noseband bridle a frentera-like strap supports a heavy noseband attached to the rings of a snaffle bit. Also in Australia, two items involve a forked strap suspended from the browband or crownpiece of the bridle, that help to maintain the position of the bit. These are the bit lifter and its variant cheekers, a rubber bit lifter with an integral pair of bit guards. Both bit lifters and cheekers are approved for thoroughbred racing in Australia. In the United States and Canada, a leather thong or string is sometimes attached to the top of the crownpiece of a headstall and used to support a bosal. It sometimes is tied to the horse's forelock rather than the headstall and then may be called a forelock hanger.

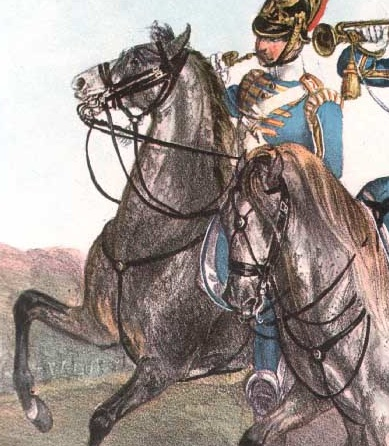
Frentera on horses of the Badisches Dragoner 2nd Regiment circa 1830 (illustrated 1835)

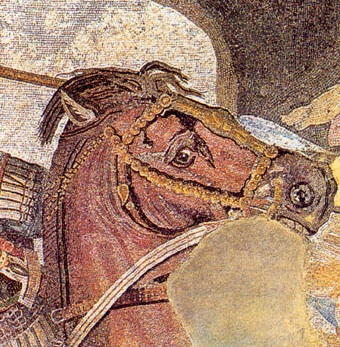
Frentera on Alexander the Great's horse Bucephalus, depicted in the Alexander Mosaic

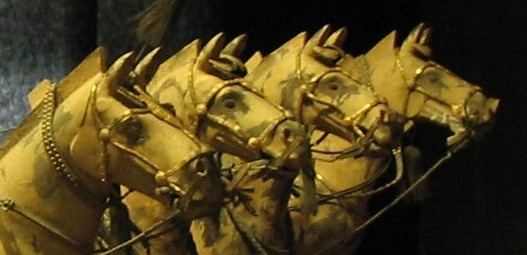
Four-horse chariot team of the Terracotta Army

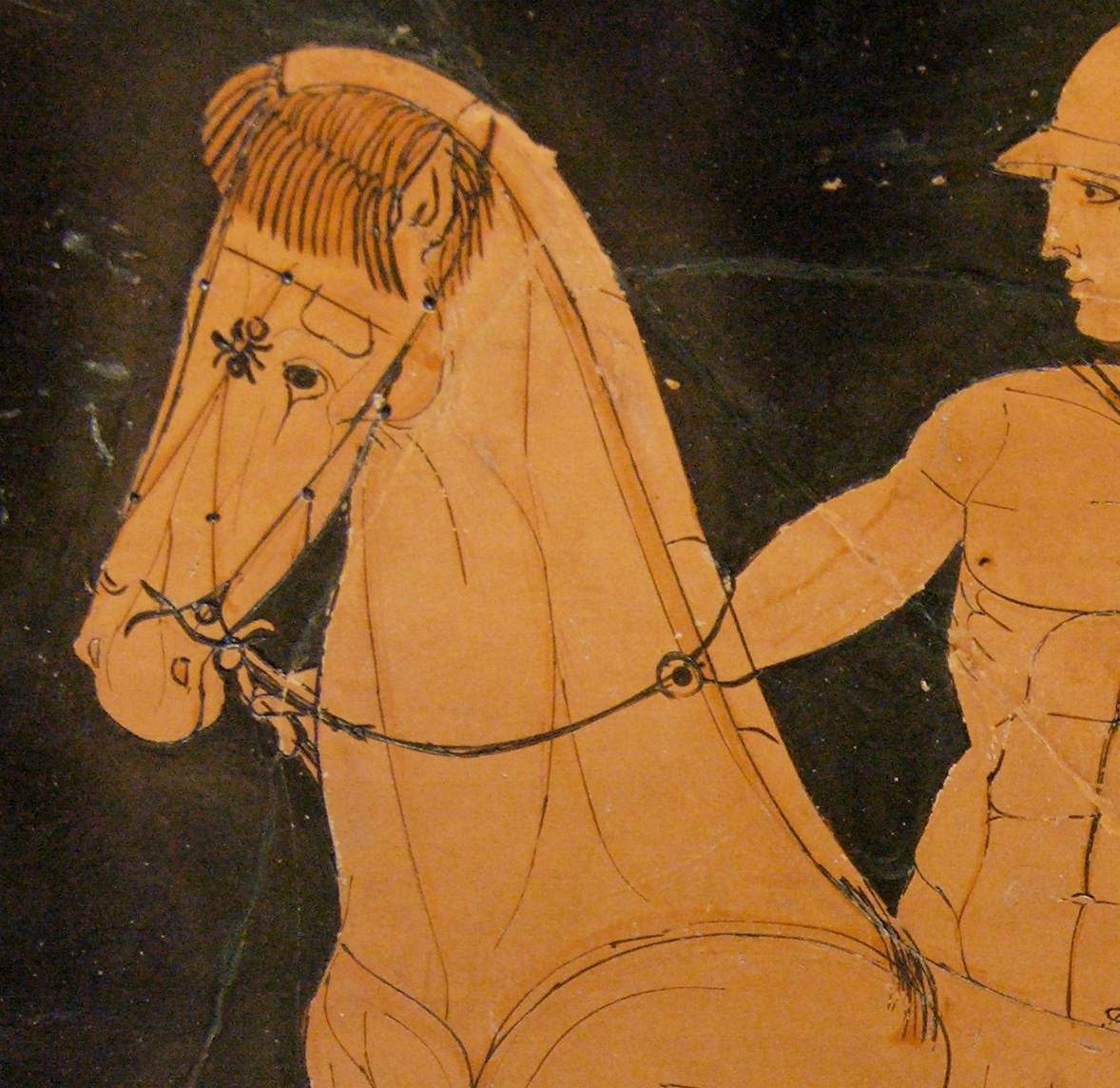
Frentera on the bridle of a horse, depicted in the 4th century BC

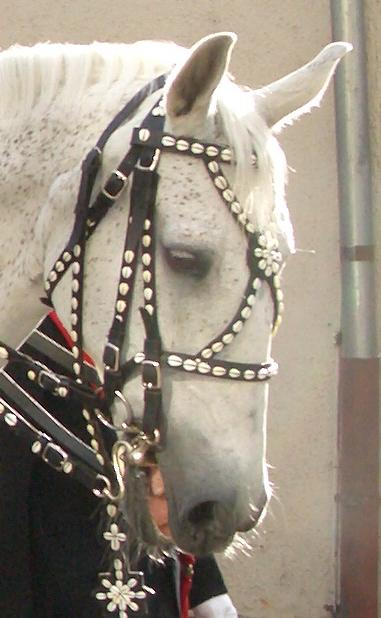
Frentera on a double bridle, Germany
