= Bridle =

Piece of equipment used to direct a horse

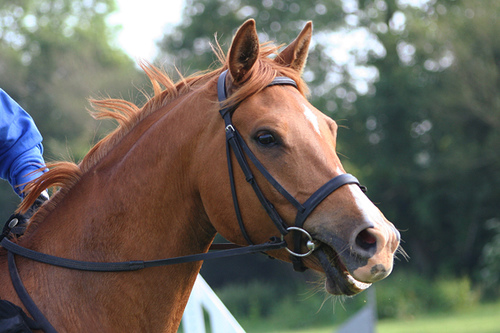
A hunt seat style English bridle

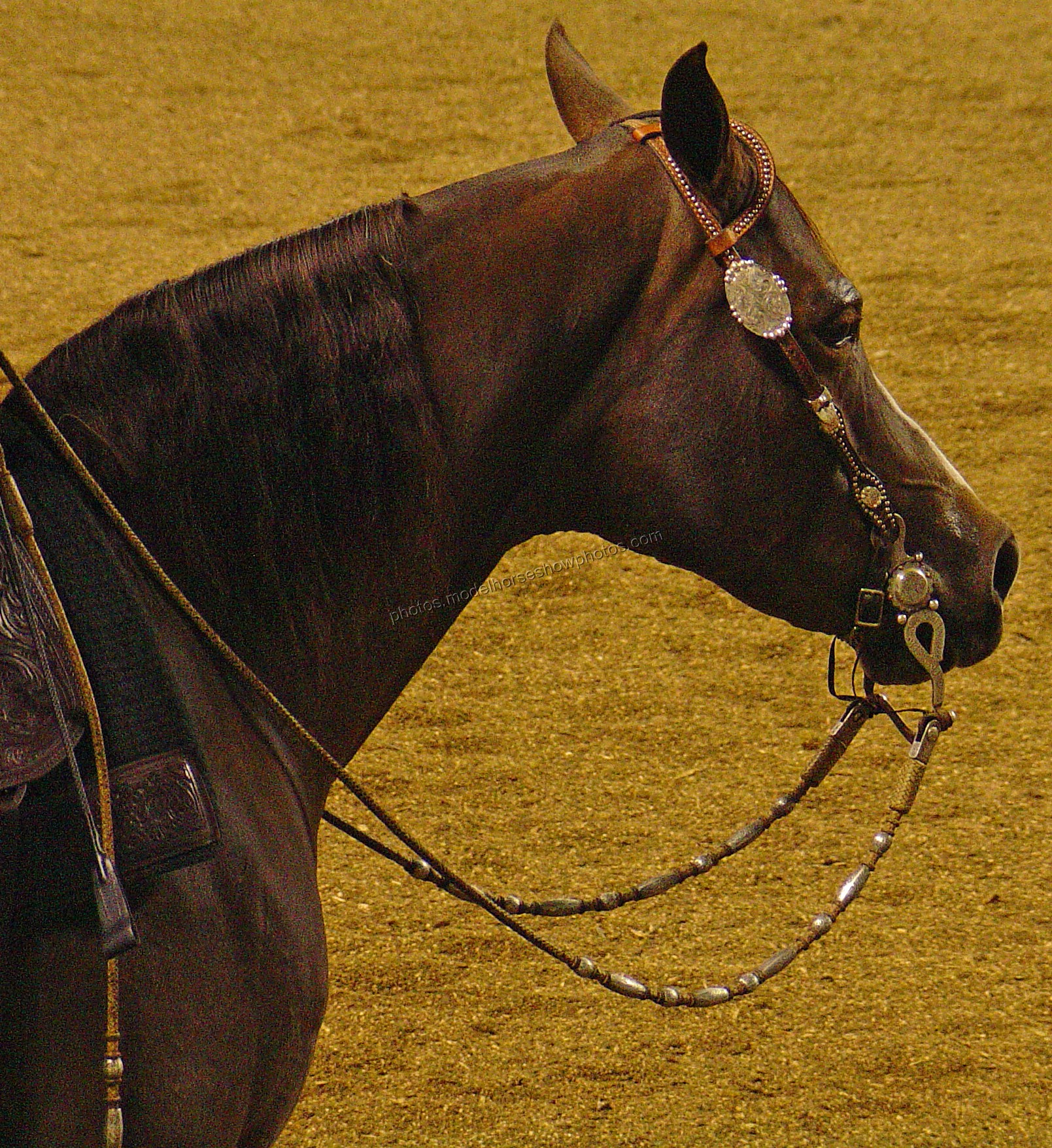
Western show bridle

A bridle is a piece of equipment used to direct a horse. It includes both the headstall that holds a bit that goes in the mouth of a horse, and the reins that are attached to the bit. It provides additional control and communication through rein pressure. The trade that makes bridles is a saddler.

Headgear without a bit that uses a noseband to control a horse is called a hackamore, or, in some areas, a bitless bridle. There are many different designs with many different name variations, but all use a noseband that is designed to exert pressure on sensitive areas of the animal's face to provide direction and control.

The bridle was devised by Indo-European herders of the Pontic-Caspian steppes to control horses between 3000 BC and 2000 BC.

== Parts ==
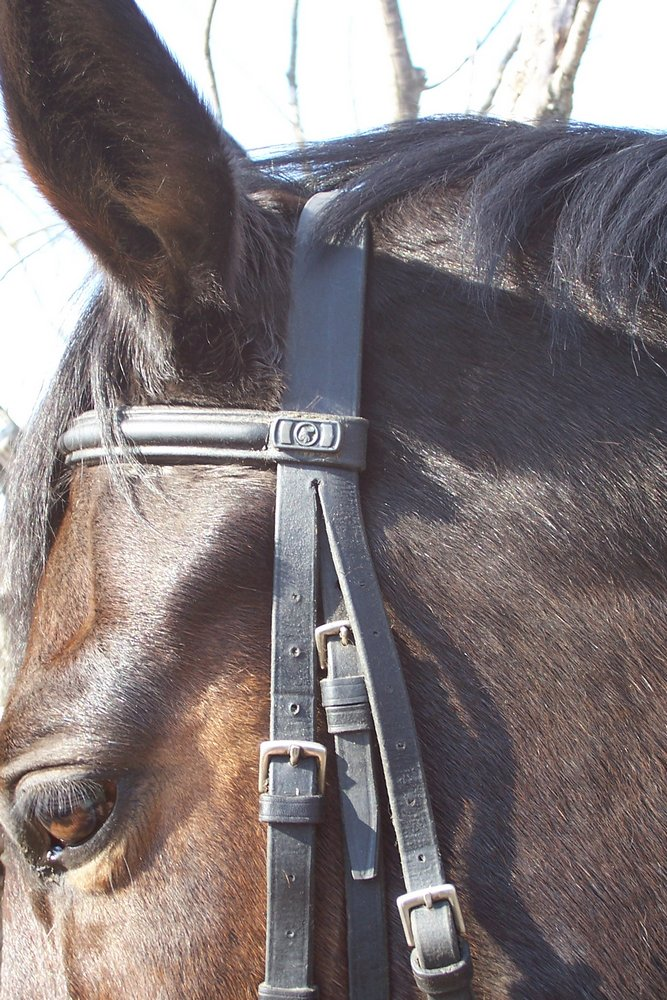
The crownpiece runs over the horse's poll, and the browband across the forehead. The cheekpieces run down the sides of the horse's face.

The bridle consists of the following elements:

- Crownpiece: The crownpiece, headstall (US) or headpiece (UK) goes over the horse's head just behind the animal's ears, at the poll. It is the main strap that holds the remaining parts of the bridle in place.
- Cheekpieces: On most bridles, two cheekpieces attach to either side of the crownpiece and run down the side of the horse's face, along the cheekbone and attach to the bit rings. On some designs, the crownpiece is a longer strap that includes the right cheek and crownpiece as a single unit and only a left side cheekpiece is added.
- Throatlatch: the throatlatch (US) or throatlash (UK) is usually part of the same piece of leather as the crownpiece. It runs from the horse's right ear, under the horse's throatlatch, and attaches below the left ear. The main purpose of the throatlatch is to prevent the bridle from coming off over the horse's head, which can occur if the horse rubs its head on an object, or if the bit is low in the horse's mouth and tightened reins raise it up, loosening the cheeks.
- Browband: The crownpiece runs through the browband. The browband runs from just under one ear of the horse, across the forehead, to just under the other ear. It prevents the bridle from sliding behind the poll onto the upper neck, and holds multiple headstalls together when a cavesson or second bit is added, and holds the throatlatch in place on designs where it is a separate strap. In certain sports, such as dressage and saddle seat, decorative browbands are sometimes fashionable.
- Noseband: the noseband encircles the nose of the horse. It is often used to keep the animal's mouth closed, or to attach other pieces or equipment, such as martingales. See also Noseband.
- Cavesson, also called Caveson or caves[s]on noseband, is a specific type of noseband used on English bridles wherein the noseband is attached to its own headstall, held onto the rest of the bridle by the browband. Because it has a separate headstall (also called sliphead), a cavesson can be adjusted with greater precision; a noseband that is simply attached to the same cheekpieces that hold the bit cannot be raised or lowered. In Saddle seat riding, the cavesson is often brightly colored and matches the browband. Variations on the standard English-style bridle are often named for their style of noseband. For use in polo, a gag bridle usually has a noseband plus a cavesson.
- Frentera, a strap running from the browband to the noseband, primarily seen on bridles of certain South American designs.
- Fiador, a form of throatlatch, is used with a hackamore.
- Reins: The reins of a bridle attach to the bit, below the attachment for the cheekpieces. The reins are the rider's link to the horse, and are seen on every bridle. Reins are often laced, braided, have stops, or are made of rubber or some other tacky material to provide extra grip.
- Bit: The bit goes into the horse's mouth, resting on the sensitive interdental space between the horse's teeth known as the "bars".

On a double bridle, where the horse carries two bits (a curb and small snaffle, often called a "bit and bradoon"), a second, smaller headstall, known as a 'bradoon hanger' or ‘slip head’ is used to attach the bradoon. A second set of reins is attached to the bradoon, and hence the rider carries four reins.

The bridle, depending on style, may also contain some of the following elements:

- Bit guards: Bit guards are optional fittings used on some bits.
- Curb strap or curb chain, used primarily on bridles with a curb bit, a small strap or chain, usually flat, that runs from one side of the bit to the other, and puts pressure on the chin groove when curb reins are tightened.
- Lip strap: a small strap used on a few curb bit designs, attaches between the bit shanks of a curb bit at the halfway point, used to keep the curb chain properly positioned and may prevent the horse from grabbing at the shanks with its lips.
- Bit hobble: basically, a curb strap used on the snaffle bit rings of a western bridle. Provides no leverage, but because open-faced bridles have no cavesson to prevent the horse from gaping its mouth open, it prevents the bit rings from being pulled through the mouth if strong pressure is applied.
- Shank hobble: A strap, bar or chain that connects the shanks of a curb bit at the bottom of the bit. Serves to stabilize the bit, prevent a lasso or other object from being caught on the shanks.
- Winkers or blinkers, also called "blinders", are partial eye blocks used primarily on driving horses and some race horses that prevent the animal from seeing what is behind it.
- Overcheck, also called a bearing rein or "check rein", is a specialty rein that runs from a snaffle bit, past the crownpiece, along the crest of the neck, and attaches to the front of a harness on a driving horse. It prevents the horse from dropping its head too low. Overchecks are also sometimes used on riding horses, especially ponies, to keep them from grazing while being ridden by a small child who may lack the physical strength or skill to raise the animal's head up.
- Ornaments such as phalerae and sallongs.

== Types ==
=== "English" styles ===
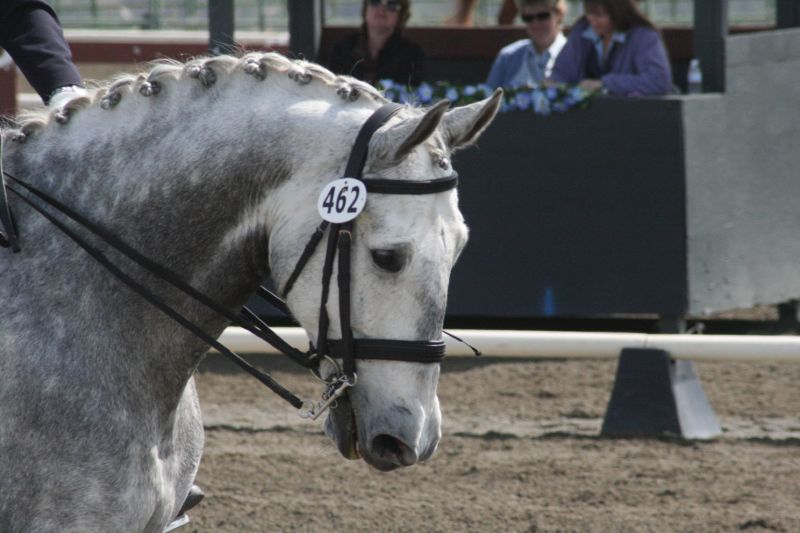
A double bridle, using two bits

- Snaffle bridle: the "English-type" snaffle bridle is most commonly seen in English riding. It is a basic bridle that carries one bit and usually has one set of reins. Despite the name, a snaffle bridle may be used not only with a snaffle bit, but also with almost any other types of single rein bits, including Kimblewicks (US: Kimberwick), gag bits, and single curb bits. The English bridle is almost always used with some type of cavesson noseband.
- Pelham bridle: The Pelham is another English type bridle that carries a single bit, in this case a Pelham bit, but two sets of reins, one for snaffle action and one for curb action.
- Double bridle: Also called a Weymouth bridle, a double bridle uses two bits at once: a small snaffle called a bradoon and a curb or Weymouth bit. It requires the use of two sets of reins. Double bridles are usually only seen used in upper level dressage, in saddle seat riding, and for showing in certain other events that require formal attire and equipment.

=== Stock horse and working styles ===
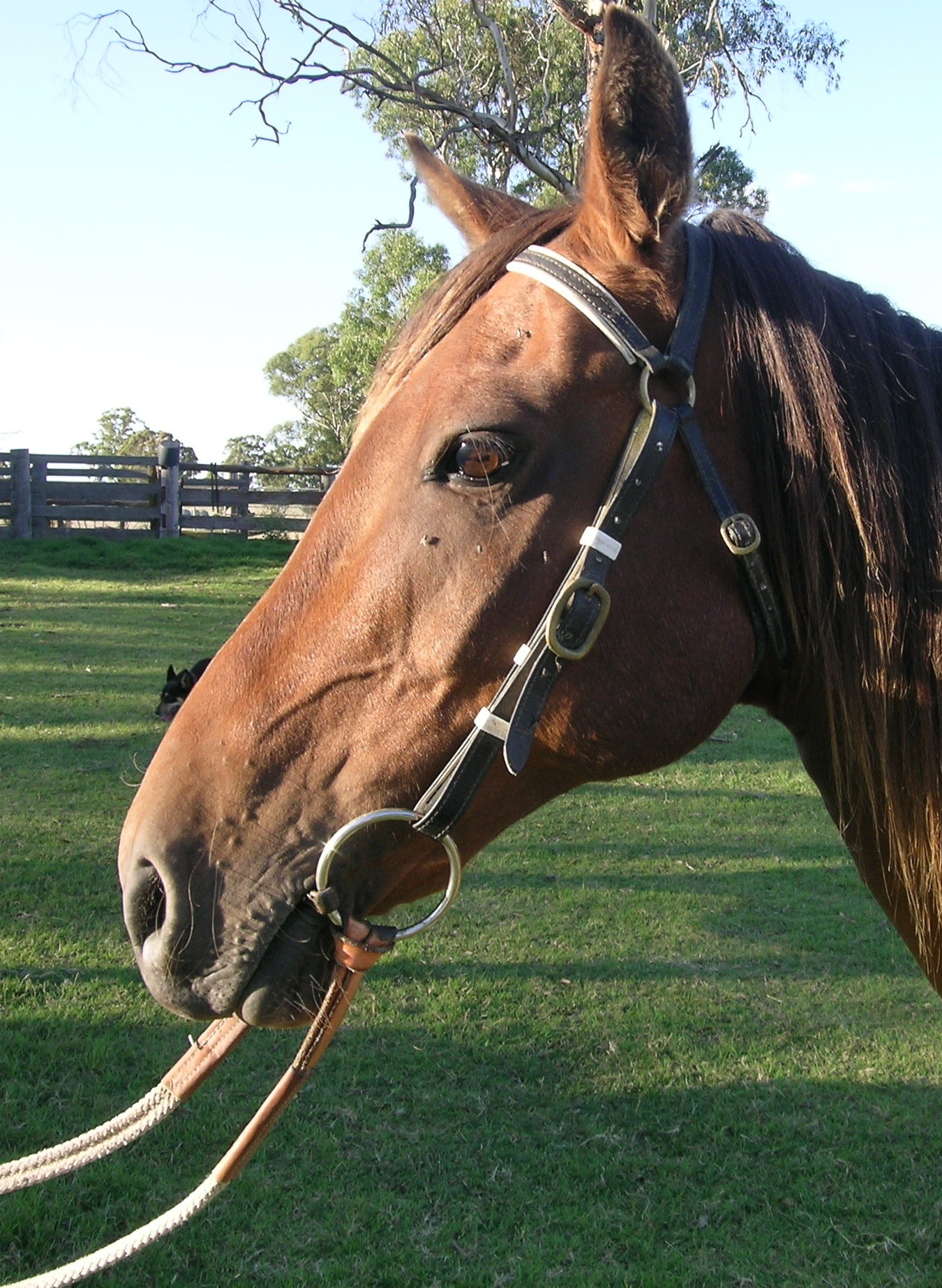
Barcoo (or ringhead) bridle as used across Australia

- Western bridle: used for American-style western riding, this bridle usually does not have a noseband. Many western bridles also lack browbands, sometimes replaced by a "one ear" (variations called "split ear", "shaped ear", and "slip ear") design where a small strap encircles one or both ears to provide extra security to keep the bridle on. Some horse show styles do not have a throatlatch, most working styles do.
- Barcoo bridle – an Australian stock horse bridle that usually does not have a noseband and is used at work and in competition. The crownpiece, browband and throatlatch are all sewn onto a ring near the horse's ears on each side of the head. The cheek strap is single strap that loops through the bit and through the ring to a buckle on the outside of the cheek. Thus the cheek strap is doubled. Variations of this bridle include an "extended head" with the throatlatch further back than usual to prevent horses rubbing the bridle off. Other variations include a noseband and these styles may be used as a headcollar. A lighter variety used for racing has cheek strap billets sewn to the ring, and the attached cheek straps are similar to those of an English bridle. Most bits can be used with these bridles with various snaffles the most commonly used.

=== Specialty styles ===
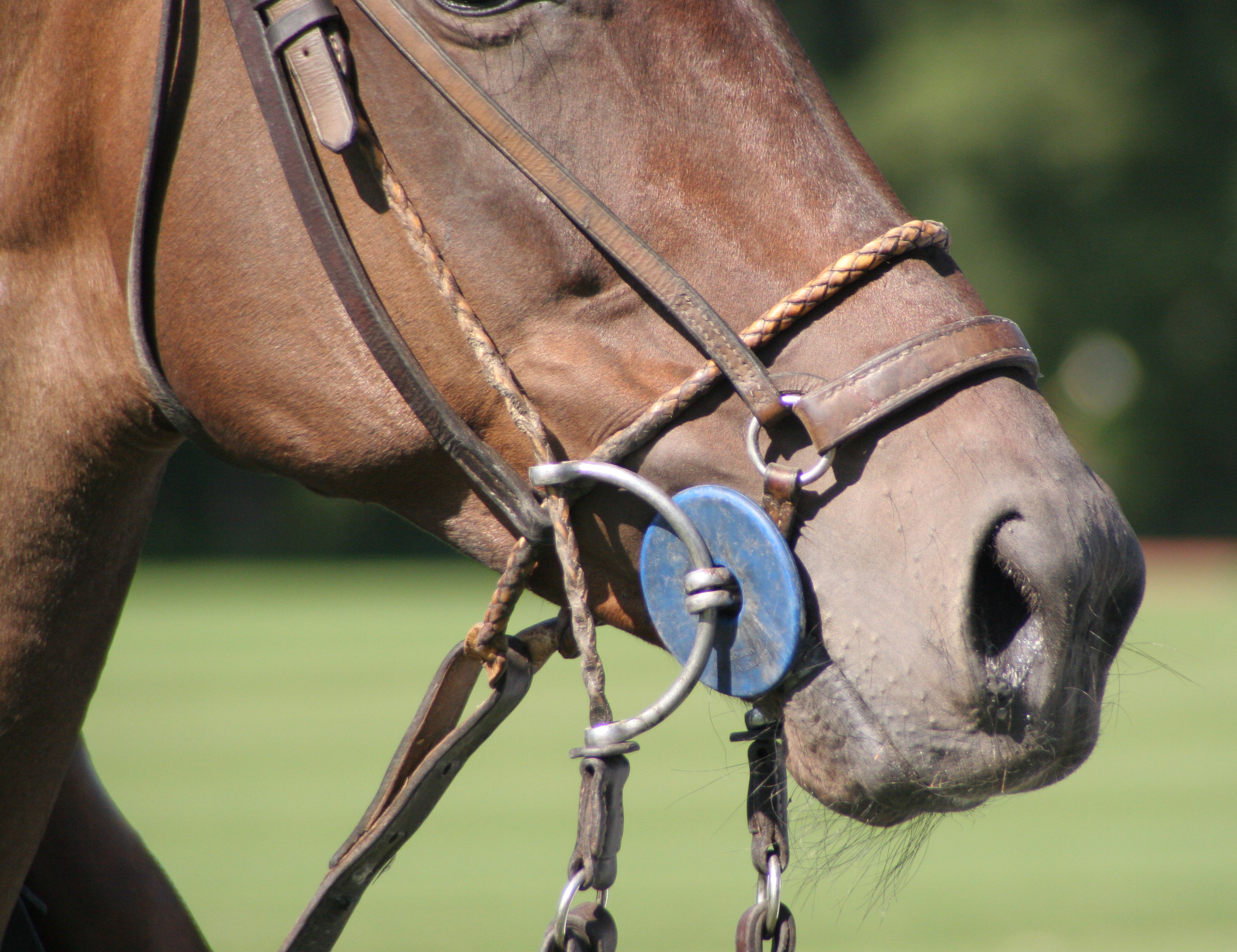
Gag bridle

- Gag bridle: a bridle with rounded cheekpieces that pass through the top and bottom holes in the bit ring of a gag bit and attach directly to the reins. Tension on the reins rotates the bit and slides it up the cheekpieces and into the corners of the lips. In some styles, the bit is sewn into the bridle and slides, but is not interchangeable, other styles have detachable cheekpieces that allow bits to be changed. Gag bridles have the potential for severe action. They are often seen in polo, rodeo speed events, and occasionally show jumping. They are not permitted in most other horse show competition. In polo, they are often used with double reins, in the same manner as a Pelham bridle.
- Halter bridle, also known as a "trail bridle" or "endurance" bridle, this design is a halter with additional quick release cheekpieces that hold a bit and reins. They are an alternative to using a bitted bridle over the top of a halter. During rest stops, instead of removing the bridle, the rider only needs to remove the bit and reins. Variations of this bridle are used by the Australian Light Horse, the Household Cavalry, the Royal Canadian Mounted Police and some other mounted police units.

== Hackamores and bitless bridles ==
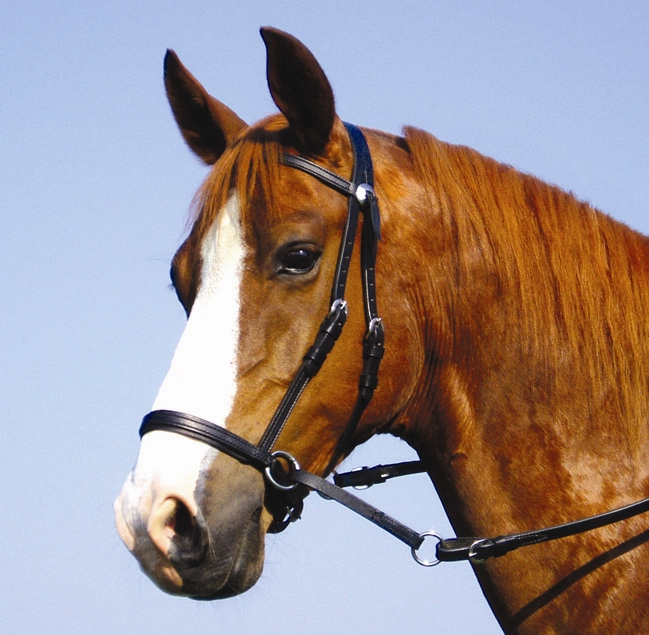
A bitless bridle

A hackamore, put simply, is headgear that controls a horse via pressure points on the face, usually with a nosepiece instead of a bit. A hackamore is not the same thing as a halter, as a halter is primarily used for leading and tying up an animal. Bitless bridles are similar to hackamores, but some designs use different leverage principles for control. Hackamores and bitless bridles use a headstall with reins attached to some type of noseband or nosepiece. Various designs allow control and good communication to the horse and may, in some cases, be more comfortable to the horse, particularly a young animal or one with a mouth injury.

The jaquima or original bosal style hackamore is mostly seen on young horses being started under saddle in western riding disciplines. Bitless bridles and other types of hackamore are most often seen on horses used for endurance riding and trail riding. A design called the mechanical hackamore is sometimes seen at rodeos. Most horse show events do not allow bitless bridles of any kind. The exceptions are show jumping, where equipment rules are fairly generous, and in certain western horse show classes for "junior" horses, which permit use of bosal hackamore.

Besides the bosal hackamore, there are many other designs. A design that combines elements of the bosal hackamore is known as a sidepull, which acts mostly on the nose, and are popular with western riders and many trail riders. English riders sometimes use a jumping cavesson or "jumping hackamore" that is basically a leather sidepull noseband reinforced internally with a cable, with rein rings attached. The so-called mechanical hackamore or "hackamore bit" is basically a hybrid bridle/hackamore made up of a noseband with shanks and a curb strap or chain that can put considerable leverage on the jaw and poll.

Another design, called a bitless bridle is the "cross-under" or "figure eight" bridle. One common design connects the reins to a loop that passes from the noseband, under the jaw, and up around the poll, returning on the opposite side back under the jaw to the noseband and out to the other rein. This design directs pressure from one rein to the opposite side of the horse's head, or pressure on both reins to the whole head. Other designs only cross under the jaw and do not go over the poll.

Some riders, not realizing that a horse's head overall is a very sensitive area, use a noseband-based style of headgear without the same caution they might use with a bit, thus defeating any benefit that an apparently milder form of gear would otherwise provide. While many bitless designs are marketed as humane, and some are indeed quite mild, other designs can be remarkably harsh in the hands of a poor rider, particularly if they are improperly adjusted or have metal parts, a thin design, or rough surfaces.

== Harness bridles ==
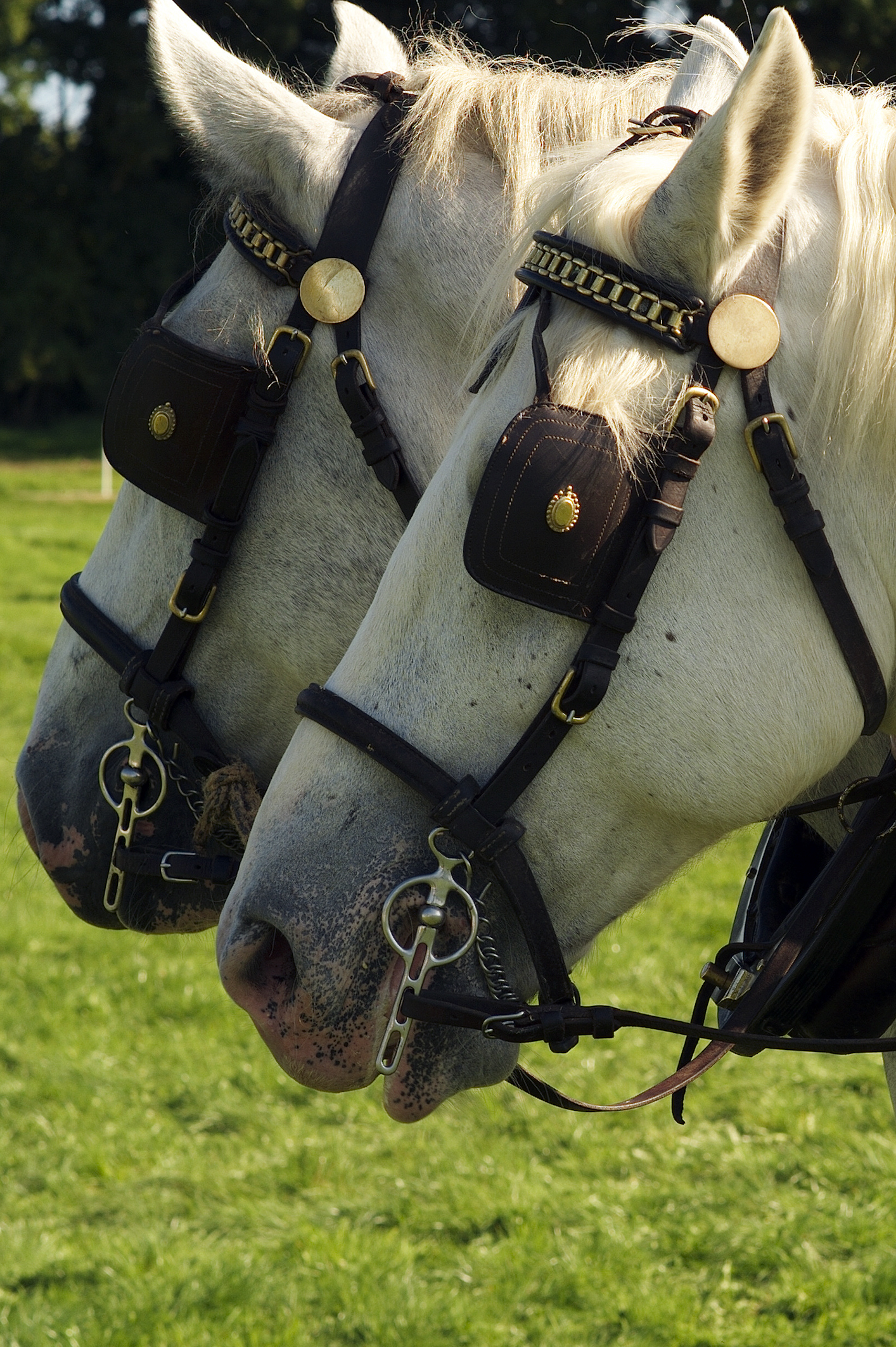
Pair of horses in matching harness bridles with Liverpool driving bits

Bridles used for driving horses have some differences from most riding bridles. The most visible difference is that they usually include partial eye coverings called blinders, blinkers or winkers that restrict the horse's peripheral vision. They are stitched into the cheekpieces of a driving bridle and sometimes bear a monogram or badge. Winkers may be square, dee-shaped, hatchet-shaped, or round, and are adjusted to fit clear of the center of the horse's eye.

The noseband is fitted into the bridle so has a certain amount of action, and is not on a separate headstall (also called sliphead) as is a cavesson. Harness bridles may feature a fancy browband, rosettes, and other ornamentation. An overcheck or bearing reins are sometimes used to control a horse's head carriage and may be used in conjunction with an overcheck bit.

The Liverpool curb bit is most commonly used for carriage driving. The reins can be attached in any of the three slots along the shanks, resulting in a snaffle or curb action as required. Wilson snaffle bits are commonly used with trade turnouts. These bits have four rings so that the inner two rings may be attached to the cheek pieces and the outer pair to the reins. This arrangement is designed to prevent rein pressure interfering with the position of the winkers. Other styles of bits are used for harness racing, fine harness, and coach driving.

== Fitting a bridle ==
A bridle is individually fitted to a horse. Without properly fitting the bridle to the horses’ head, the horse may be uncomfortable, and poor fitting may also result in lack of control while riding or unclear communication.

The length of each piece of the bridle needs to be individually adjusted to fit the horse's head. Other parts of the bridle are adjustable in length, though there are limits to adjustment and thus many manufacturers offer two to six different basic sizes. The sizes may have different names, but in the US and Canada they are often called "cob" and "horse" for small and large animals, sometimes with "pony", "mini", "warmblood" and "draft" sizes in some designs.

The bit and browband are of set lengths and must be selected in the correct size. A too-narrow bit is uncomfortable and cannot be widened. One that is slightly too wide can be narrowed to some extent by adding a pair of bit guards. A browband that is too short causes the browband or crownpiece to rub the ears. The cheekpieces are adjusted not only so that the bit avoids the extremes of pulling the corners of the horse's mouth or banging the horse's incisors, but also so it hangs properly in the mouth for the specific riding discipline and bit design involved . The adjustment of the noseband depends on the type used, but needs to be snug enough to be effective, yet loose enough to avoid discomfort. The throatlatch is adjusted each time the bridle is put on the horse, loose enough to not interfere as the horse flexes at the poll. A standard throatlatch measurement is that the width of three or four fingers should be able to fit between the throatlatch and the horses’ cheek.

== Dangers of tying with a bridle ==
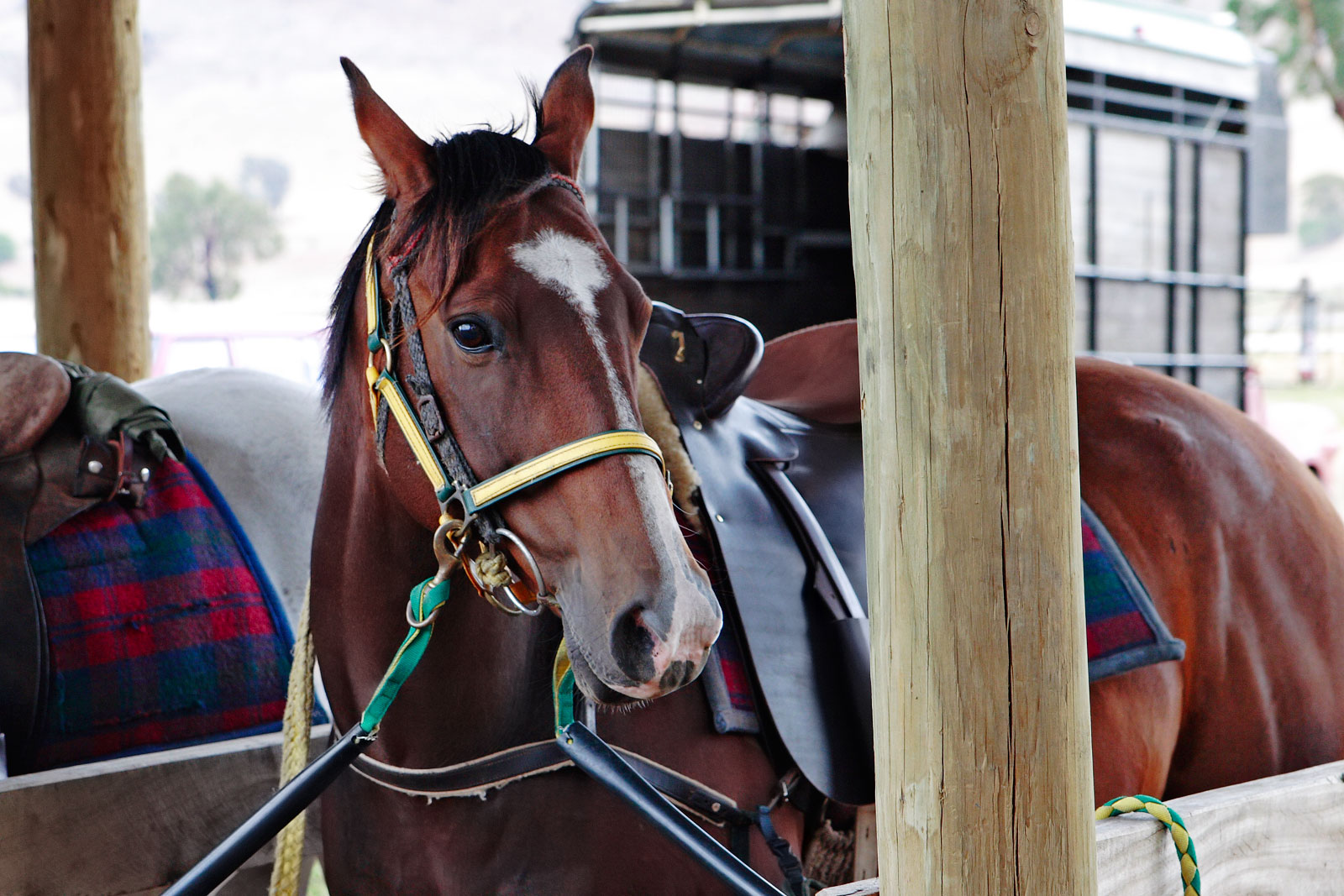
If a horse must be tied to an object, a halter should be placed under or over the bridle, and the cross-ties should be attached to halter rings rather than the bit.

It is unsafe to tie a horse using a bridle for two main, seemingly contradictory, reasons. First, if the tied animal pulls back on the bridle, the bit or controlling noseband (such as a bosal or mechanical hackamore) may cause considerable pain or even injury to the mouth, tongue, or other facial structures of the animal even if the bridle breaks. Second, compared to halters, most bridles are made of thin leather which will easily break under pressure. The end result can be both injury to the horse and broken equipment. Should a rider need to tie a horse, best practice is to either remove the bridle and put on a halter, or to put a halter on in addition to the bridle (under or over the bridle), and tie the horse using the halter only. In addition, tying with a slipknot that can be released by pulling on the end of the lead rope is a key safety tactic.

In western riding, some horses are taught to "ground tie" with a bridle, that is, to stand still when the reins are dropped on the ground. This can only be done with split reins, as a horse can easily put a foot through a pair of reins that are attached to one another. Even with split reins, a horse can still step on a rein, jerk its head up and both break the rein and injure its mouth. Historically, it was a useful skill if a rider had to momentarily dismount and perform a task that required both hands (such as removing brush or fixing a fence) in a remote area where tying was impracticable. In actual practice, just as with the "stay" command used in obedience work for dogs, even well-trained horses may not stay "ground tied" for long, especially if left unsupervised. Thus, ground tying today is usually seen in specific classes at horse shows such as the trail horse class, or as a useful short-term command: many horses are taught to stand still for a limited period of time on a "whoa" or "stay" command, with or without dropping the reins.
