= Martingale (tack) =

Horse equipment

A martingale is any of several designs of tack that are used on horses to control head carriage. Martingales may be seen in a wide variety of equestrian disciplines, both riding and driving. Rules for their use vary widely; in some disciplines they are never used, others allow them for schooling but not in judged performance, and some organizations allow certain designs in competition.

The two most common types of martingale, the standing and the running, are used to control the horse's head height, and to prevent the horse from throwing its head so high that the rider loses control over the horse's speed, direction and shape of body. When a horse's head gets above a desired height, the martingale restrains the head so that it becomes more difficult or impossible to raise it higher.

== The standing martingale ==
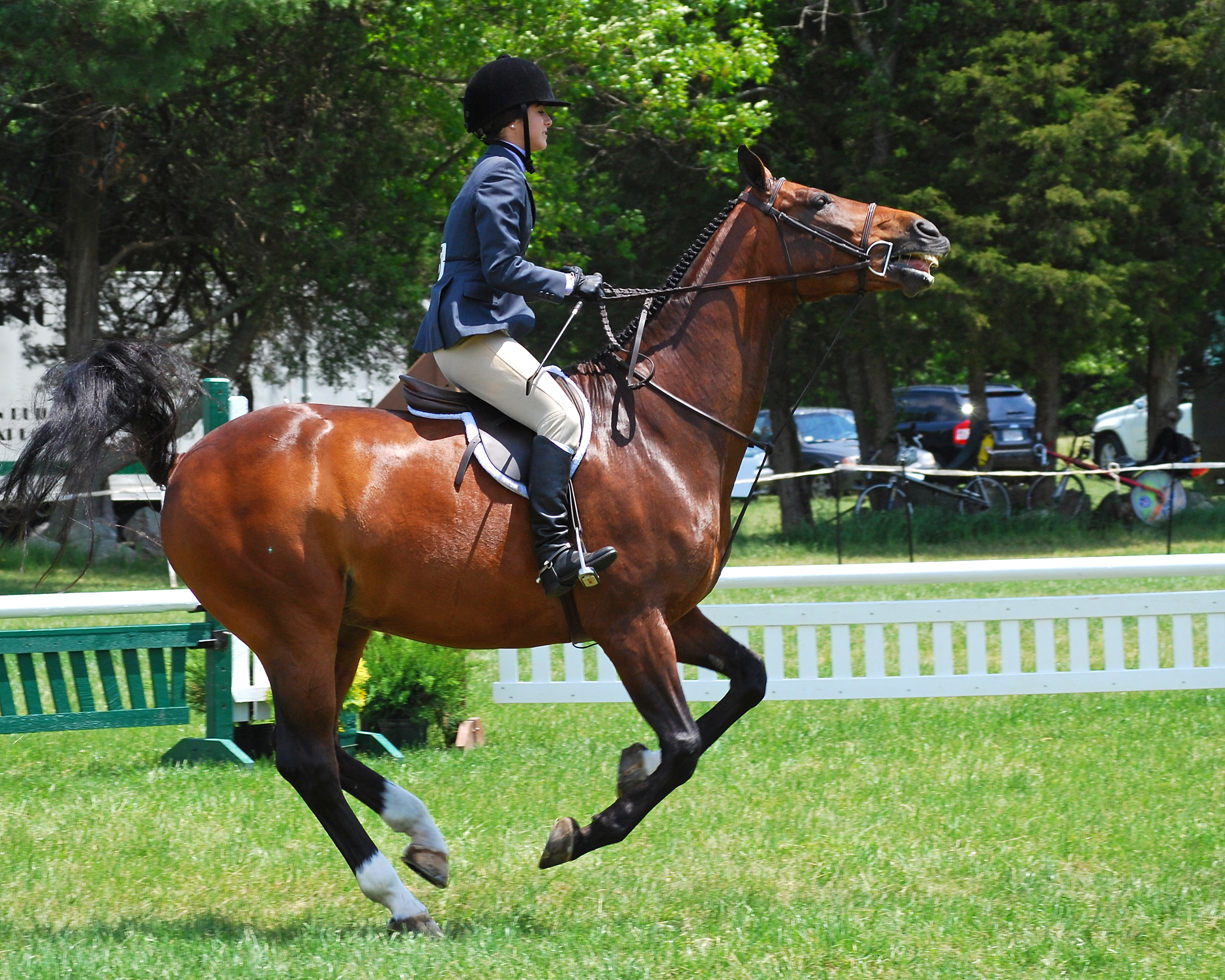
The standing martingale.

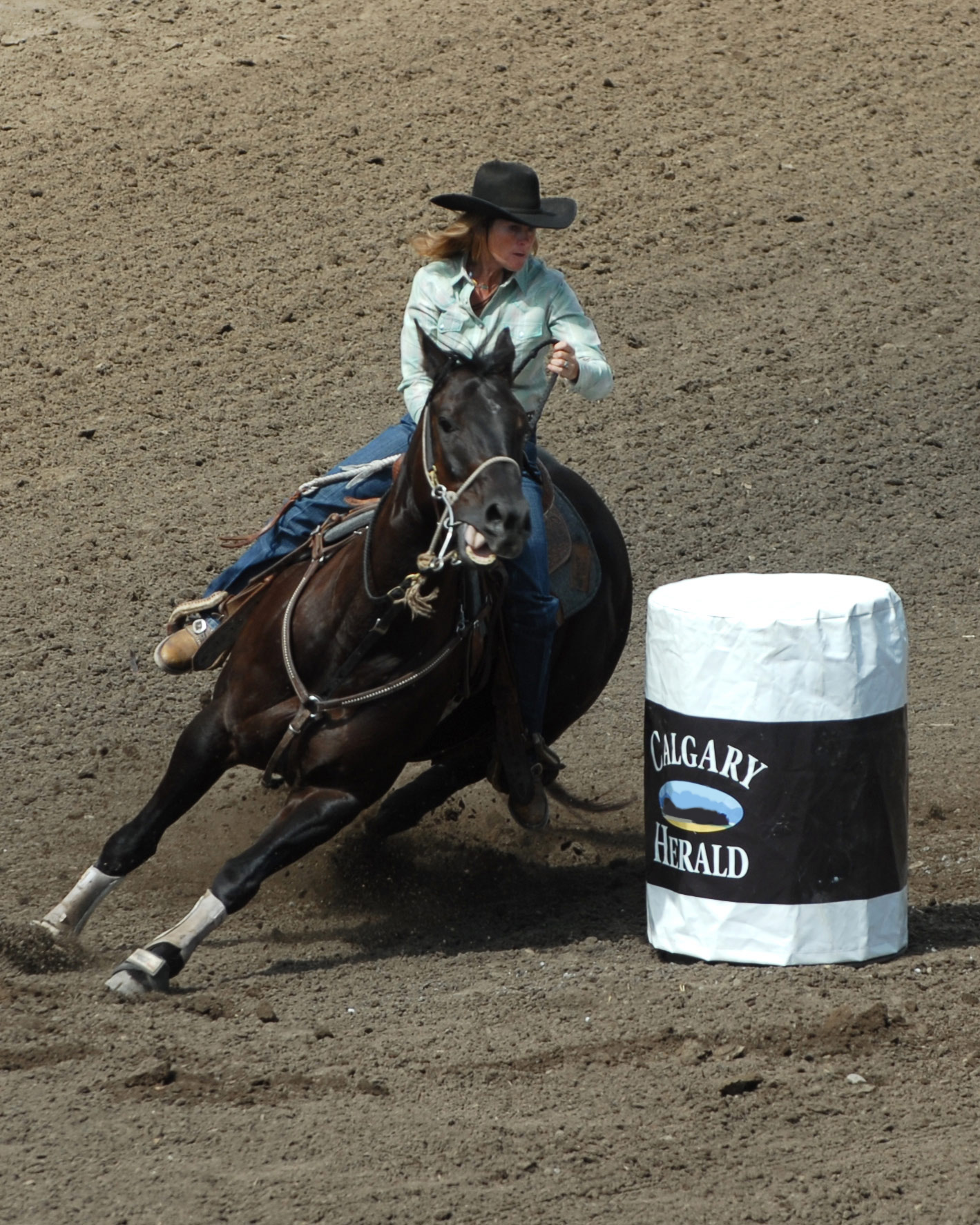
The tiedown

The standing martingale, also known as a "tiedown" or a "head check", has a single strap which is attached to the girth, passes between the horse's front legs and is fixed to the back of the noseband. To prevent it from catching on other objects, it also has a neck strap. A variation is attached to a breastplate in lieu of a neck strap. When correctly fitted for English riding, it should be possible to push the martingale strap up to touch the horse's throatlatch.

A variation of the standing martingale, called a tiedown, is seen almost exclusively in the western riding disciplines. A tiedown is adjusted much shorter than a standing martingale and is intended primarily to prevent the horse from flipping its head up when asked to abruptly stop or turn in speed events. Users also claim that it gives the horse something to brace against for balance. It consists of an adjustable strap, one end which attaches to the horse's breastplate and the other which attaches to a noseband on the bridle. The noseband can be of leather, but may also be of lariat rope, or even plastic-covered cable, which can make the western tiedown considerably harsher than the English-style standing martingale. It is properly adjusted when it puts no pressure on the horse's nose when held at a normal position, but will immediately act if the horse raises its nose more than a few inches.

With both pieces of equipment, the slack is taken up out of the strap when the horse raises its head above the desired point, and pressure is placed on the horse's nose.

The standing martingale is competition legal for show hunter and hunt seat equitation riders over fences in the US, show jumping competitions in the UK, and is permissible and in common use in fox hunting, polocrosse, horseball, and polo. It is also seen on some military and police horses, partly for style and tradition, but also in the event of an emergency that may require the rider to handle the horse in an abrupt manner. It is not legal for flat classes. The tiedown is commonly seen in rodeo and speed events such as gymkhana games, but is not show legal in any other western-style horse show competition.

=== Safety and risks ===
The standing martingale is more restrictive than the running martingale because it cannot be loosened in an emergency. A horse that trips in a standing martingale could potentially fall more easily because its range of motion is restricted. If a horse falls wearing an incorrectly fitted standing martingale, the animal cannot extend its neck fully, plus will have a more difficult time getting back up.

Due to the risk of injury to the cartilage of the nose, the martingale strap is never attached to a drop noseband. Because of the risk of both nose and jaw injuries, it also should not be attached to any type of "figure 8" or "grackle" noseband. A standing martingale can be attached to the cavesson (the upper, heavier strap) of a flash noseband, but not to the lower, "flash" or "drop" strap.

Any martingale may cause pain to the horse if misused in combination with certain other equipment. If used in conjunction with a gag bit, a standing martingale can trap the head of the horse, simultaneously asking the horse to raise and lower its head and providing no source of relief in either direction. This combination is sometimes seen in polo, in some rodeo events, and occasionally in the lower levels of jumping.

Overuse or misuse of a martingale or tiedown, particularly as a means to prevent a horse from head-tossing, can lead to the overdevelopment of the muscles on the underside of the neck, creating an undesirable "upside down" neck that makes it more difficult for the horse work properly under saddle. It may also lead to the horse tensing the back muscles and moving incorrectly, especially over fences. This may put excessive pressure on the horse's spine, reduce the shock-absorbing capacity of the leg anatomy, and can over time lead to lameness. There is also a risk of accidents: If a horse is sufficiently "trapped" by a combination of a too-short martingale and too-harsh bit, the horse may attempt to rear and, inhibited by the action of the martingale, fall, potentially injuring both horse and rider.

== The running martingale and German martingale ==
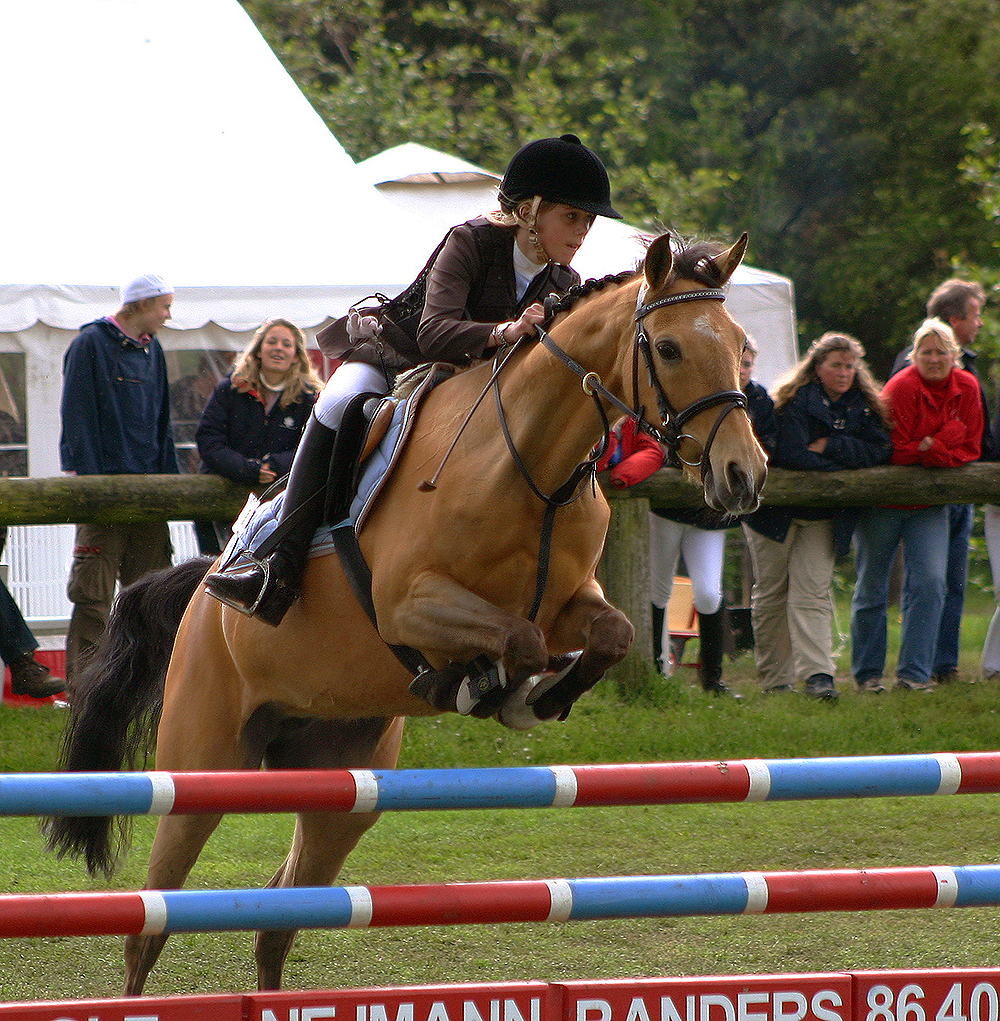
Running martingale. Note the rings that go around each of the reins, and the rein stops between the martingale rings and the bit rings.

The running martingale consists of a strap which is attached to the girth and passes between the horse's front legs before dividing into two pieces. At the end of each of these straps is a small metal ring through which the reins pass. It is held in the correct position by a neck strap or breastplate.

A running martingale is adjusted so that each of the "forks" has about an inch of slack when the horse holds its head in the normal position. When correctly adjusted, the reins make a straight line from the rider's hand to the bit ring when the horse's head in at the correct height and the running martingale is not in effect.

When the horse raises its head above the desired point, the running martingale adds leverage through the reins to the bit on the bars of the horse's mouth. The leverage created by this pressure encourages the horse to lower its head. A running martingale provides more freedom for the horse than a standing martingale, as the rider can release pressure as soon as the desired result is achieved. Additionally, if a horse happens to trip on landing after a fence, the rider can loosen the reins and the horse will have full use of its head and neck.

Because of this safety factor, the running martingale is the only style of martingale permitted for use in eventing competitions and horse racing. Some show jumpers also prefer the running martingale due to the extra freedom it provides. Running martingales are also used outside of the competition arena on young horses being trained in the Saddle seat, western riding, and many other disciplines.

The German martingale, also called a Market Harborough, consists of a split fork that comes up from the chest, runs through the rings of the bit and attaches to rings on the reins of the bridle between the bit and the rider's hand. It acts in a manner similar to a running martingale, but with additional leverage. It is not show legal and is used primarily as a training aid.

=== Safety and risks ===
A running martingale is generally used with rein stops, which are rubber or leather stops slipped onto the rein between the bit and the ring of the martingale. Rein stops are compulsory at Pony Club and British Eventing Events. They are an important safety feature that stops the martingale from sliding too far forward and getting caught on the bit ring or on the buckles or studs that attach the reins to the bit. Sanctioning organizations require a running martingale to be used in conjunction with rein stops if the reins are buckled to the bit.

The primary difficulty in use of a running martingale is the inability to raise the horse's head in the event of the animal bucking. If adjusted too short, lateral use of the reins may be impeded. If used improperly, the force exerted by the running martingale on the horse's mouth can be severe and for this reason the standing martingale is preferred in some circles. Improper use includes use on the reins of a curb bit; adjustment too short, so that the equipment pulls the horse's head below the proper position.

== The Irish martingale ==
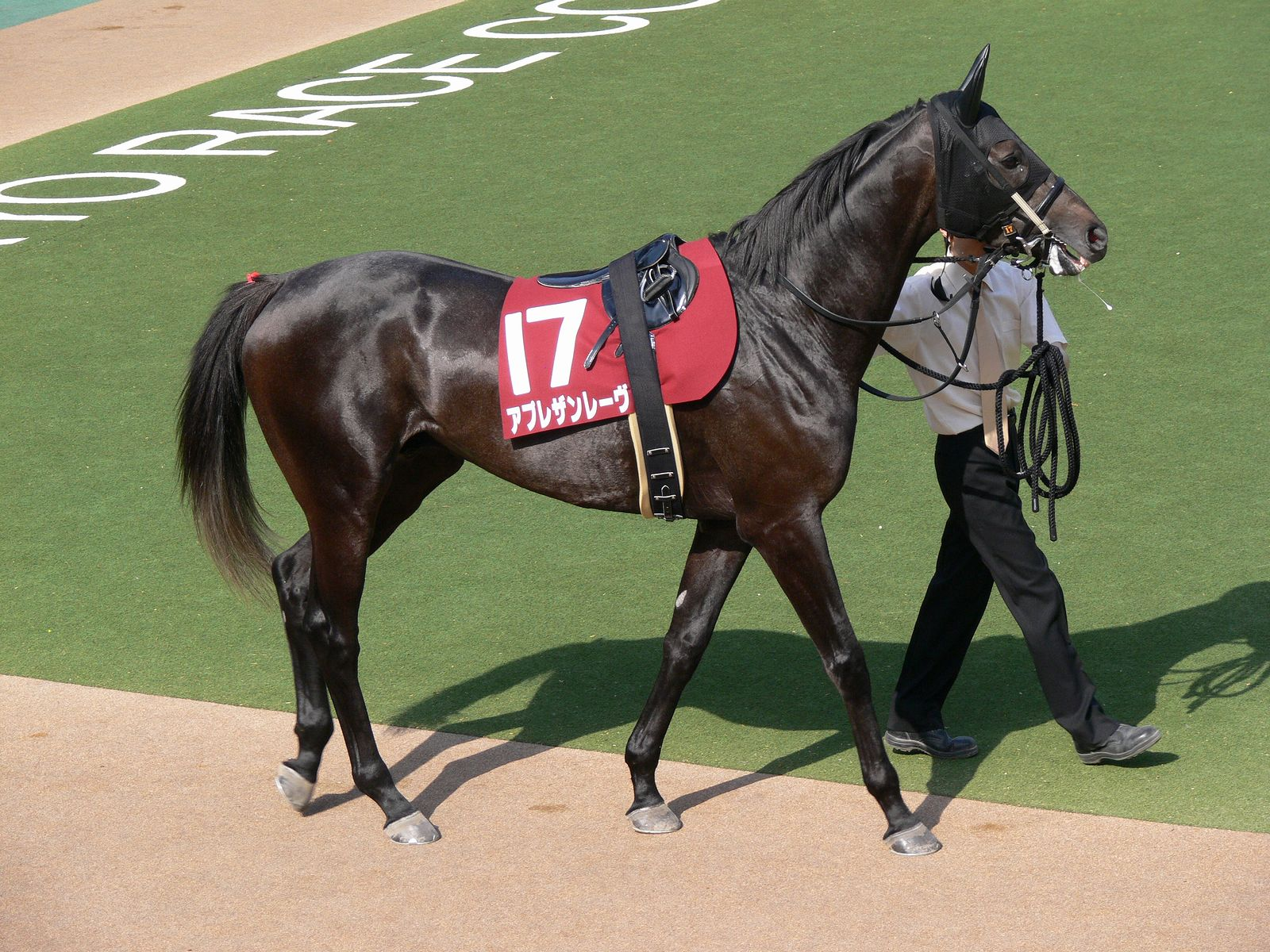
The Irish martingale joins the reins, seen here on a racehorse

The Irish martingale is not a true martingale in the sense of a device that affects the rider's control over the horse. Thus, it is sometimes known as a semi-martingale. It is a simple short strap with a ring on either end. The reins are each run through a ring on either side before being buckled. The Irish martingale's purpose is not to control the head, but to prevent the reins from coming over the horse's head, risking entanglement, should a rider fall. It is used mostly in European horse racing.

The Pony Racing Authority (PRA) requires the use of an overgirth such as a running martingale or an Irish martingale for its races. The Irish martingale must also be accompanied with a neckstrap.
