= Poll (livestock) =

Top of an animal's head between the ears

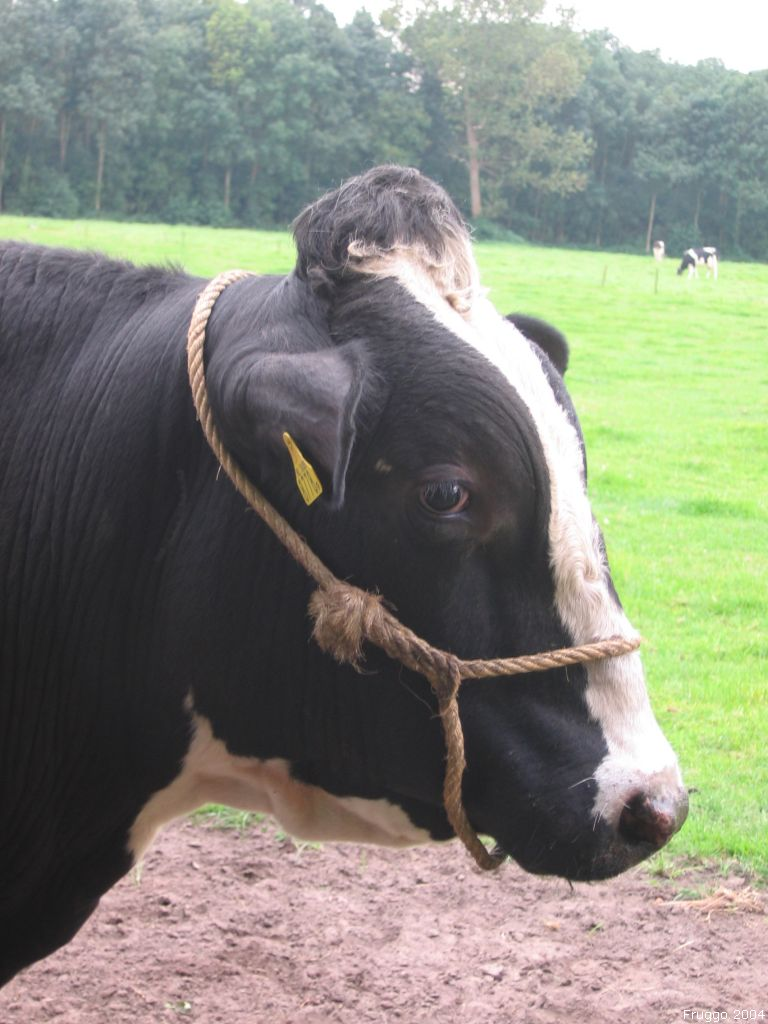
A cow with a prominent poll

The poll is a name of the part of an animal's head, alternatively referencing a point immediately behind or right between the ears. This area of the anatomy is of particular significance for the horse.

== Etymology and related terminology ==
The term poll comes from Middle English pol, polle 'scalp, pate', from Middle Dutch pol, pōle, polle 'top, summit; head'

Specifically, the "poll" refers to the occipital protrusion at the back of the skull. However, in common usage, many horsemen refer to the poll joint, between the atlas (C1) and skull as the poll. The area at the joint has a slight depression, and is a sensitive location. Thus, because the crownpiece of a bridle passes over the poll joint, a rider can indirectly exert pressure on the horse's poll by means of the reins, bit, and bridle.

== See also ==
- Polled livestock, for information on naturally or mechanically dehorned animals
