= Hackamore (disambiguation) =

Hackamore can refer to:

- The classic hackamore (Spanish: jaquima) of the vaquero tradition, featuring a bosal noseband
- The mechanical hackamore
- Any one of a number of designs of bitless bridle, sometimes also referred to as "Hackamores," referencing any type of headgear that uses a noseband in lieu of a bit (horse)
- Hackamore, California
- the jug sling knot
