= Fiador =

Fiador can refer to:

- Fiador (tack)
- Fiador knot
