= Fiador knot =

Type of knot

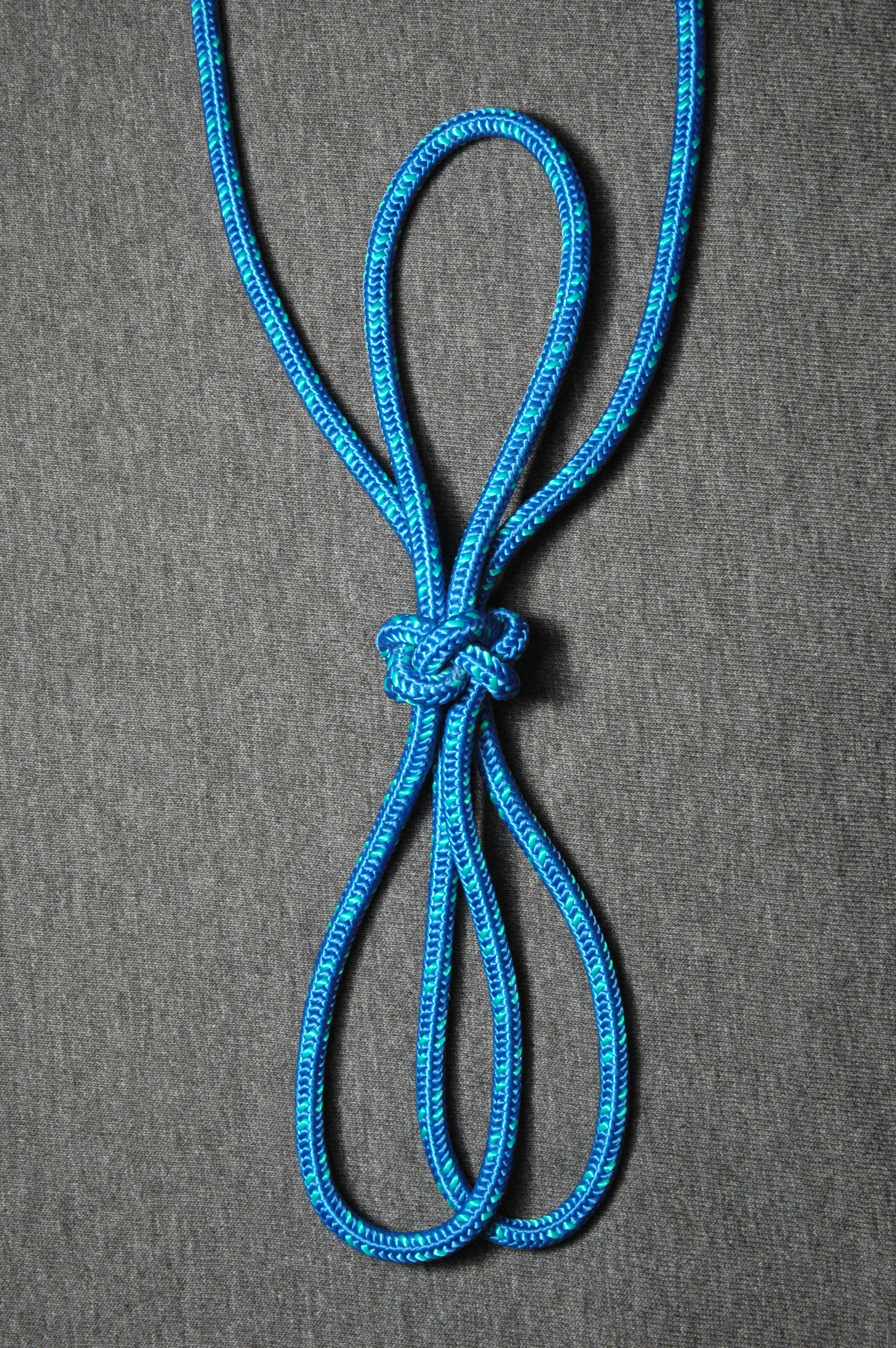
- Names: Fiador knot, Ole fiador knot, Theodore knot, Hackamore diamond knot
- Category: Loop
- Related: Bottle sling, Diamond knot
- Typical use: rope halters, hackamores, and hobbles
- ABoK: #1110, #2569

The fiador knot (also Theodore knot) is a decorative, symmetrical knot used in equine applications to create items such as rope halters, hobbles, and components of the fiador on some hackamore designs. As traditionally described, it is a four strand diamond knot in which six of the eight ends loop back into the knot, thus allowing it to be tied with a single line. While a specific knot is discussed in this article, the fiador knot has also been treated as an entire class of multi-strand knots similarly made with a single line.

== Etymology ==
The origin of the variant name "Theodore knot", used in the United States, is a corruption of the Spanish fiador. American cowboys likewise corrupted a number of other closely related terms, substituting "hackamore" for jaquima and "McCarty" for mecate.

Knotting authority Clifford Ashley relates Philip Ashton Rollins's suggestion that, "When Theodore Roosevelt, 'the hero of San Juan Hill,' visited the Southwest, shortly after the Spanish–American War, it was a foregone conclusion that the Spanish name 'Fiador' would be corrupted to 'Theodore' in his honor."

== Tying ==
Considered a difficult knot to tie, cowboys were said to have been able to collect a fee for tying it. Ashley went so far as to include it in a chapter covering trick knots in The Ashley Book of Knots stating archly, "the trick is to succeed in tying it."

Many methods have been devised to tie the fiador knot, including fixtures used to hold the parts in shape while tying. More recent sources have shown a simpler method of forming the fiador knot using a flat precursor knot.

The following images (or this video) show a method for tying the fiador knot:

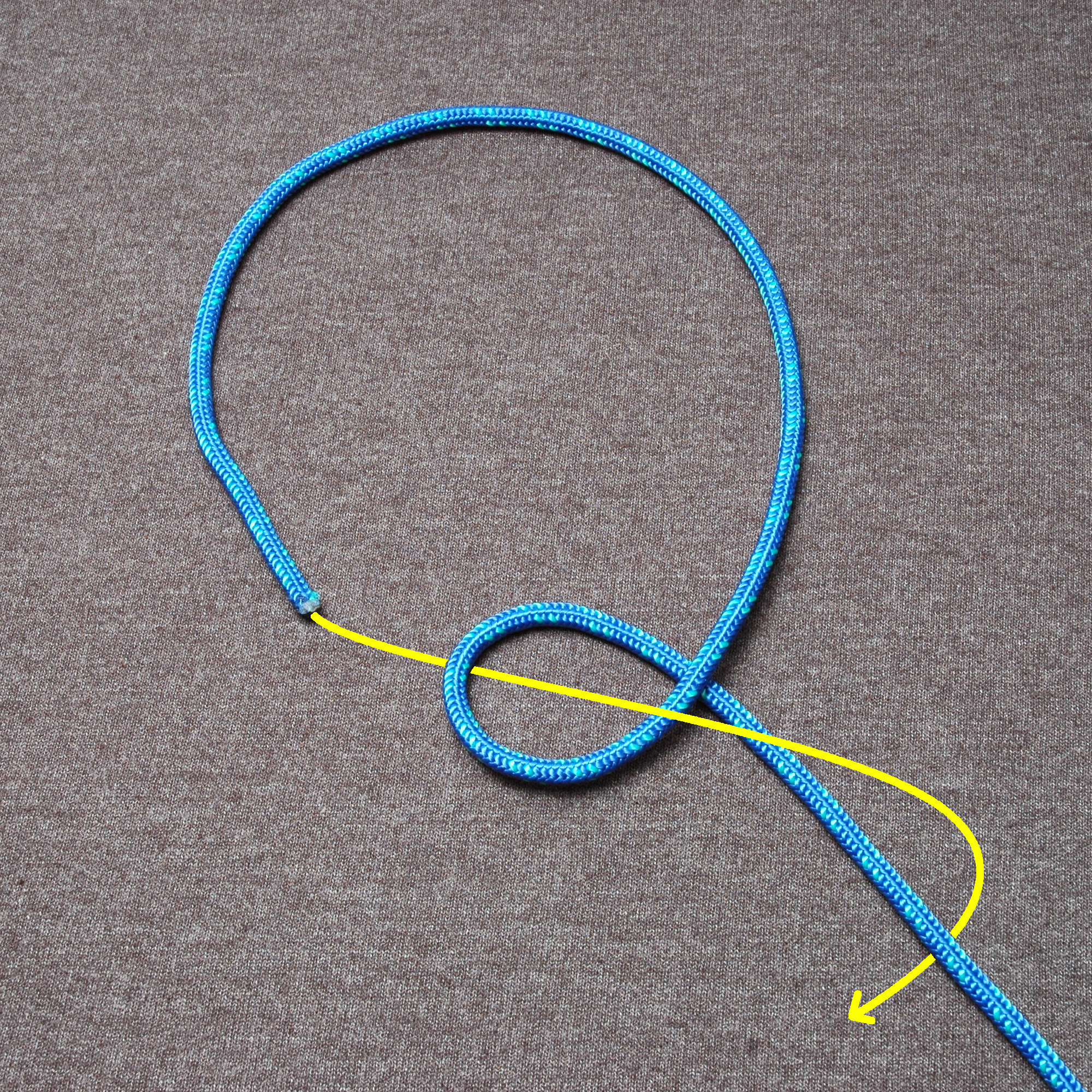

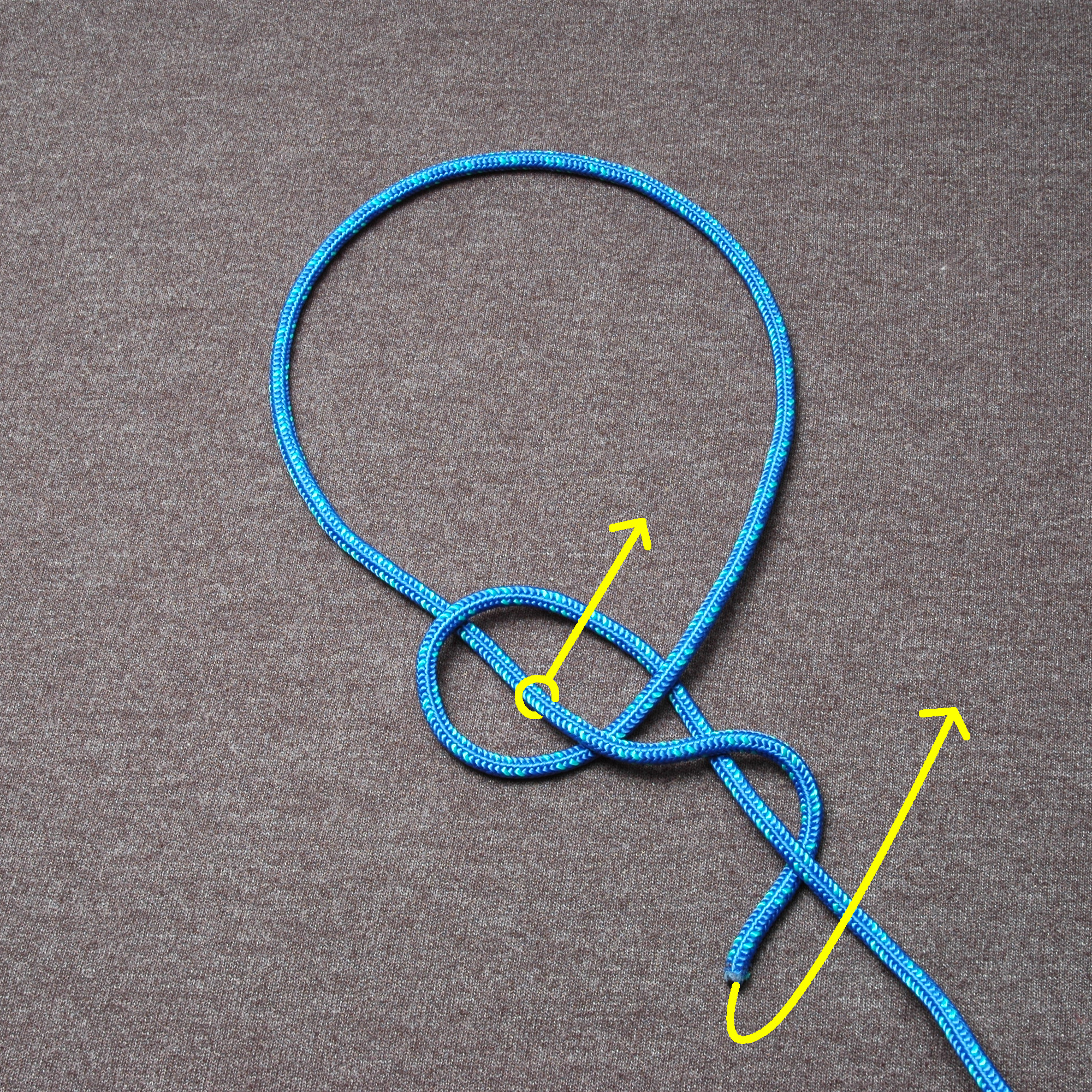

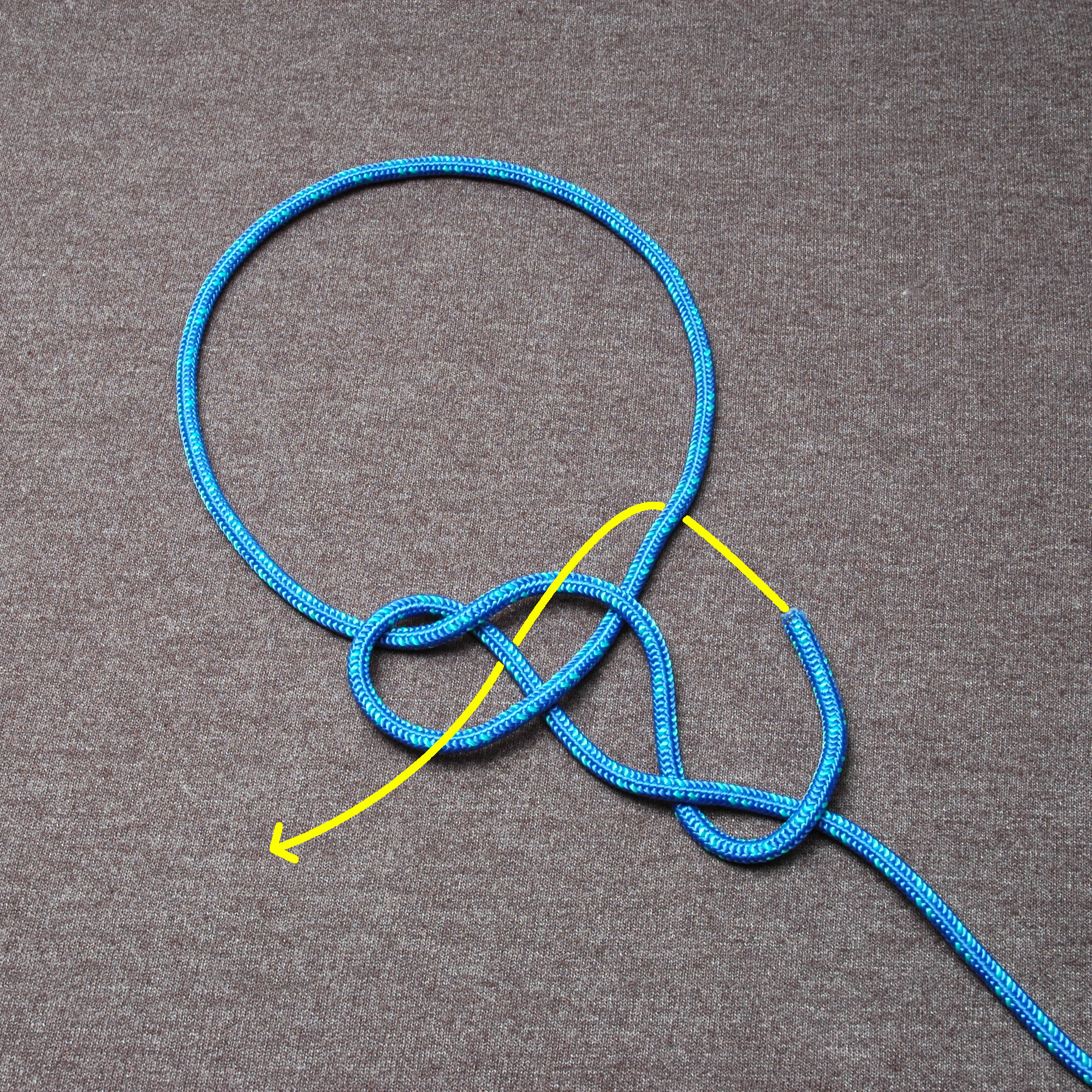

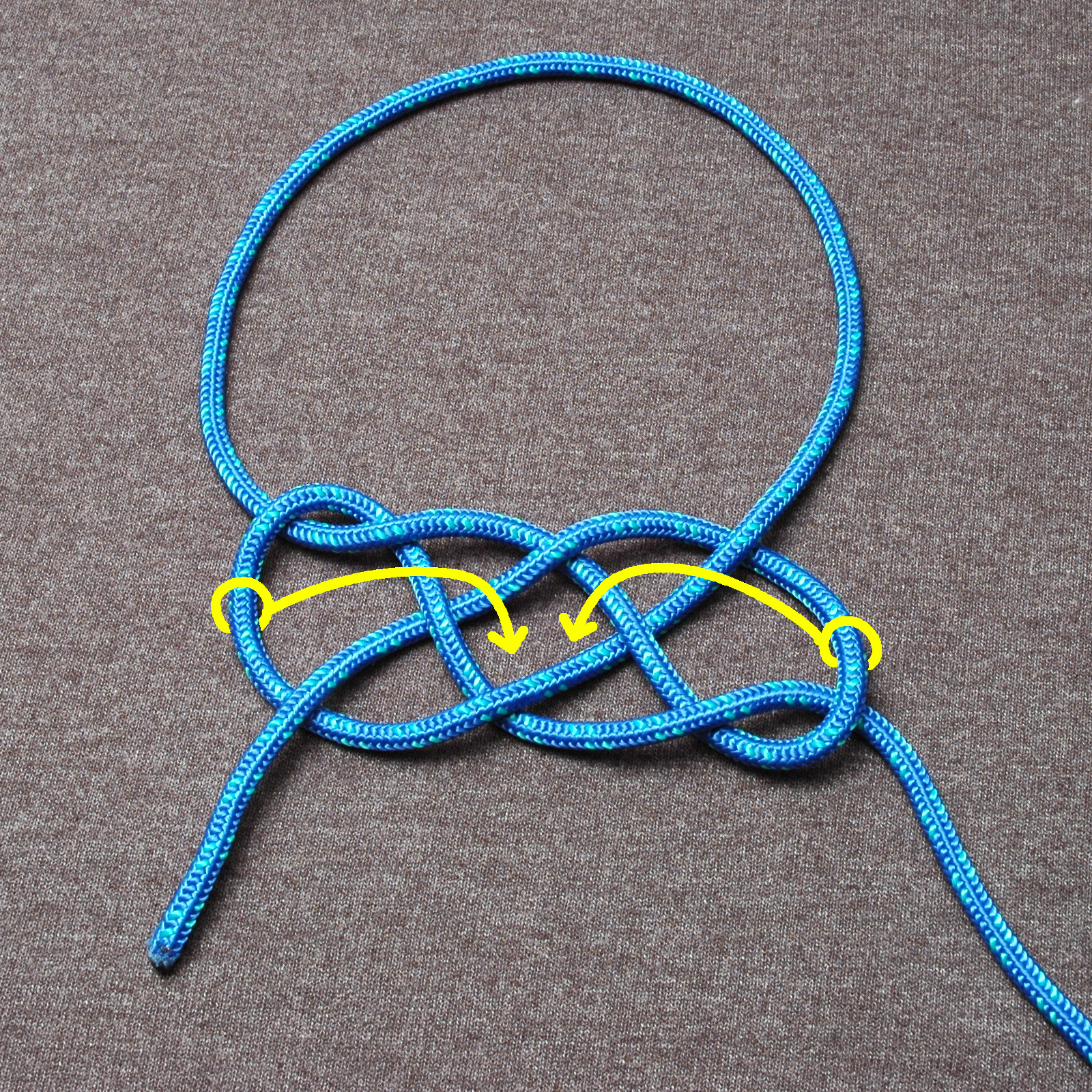

=== Tight face and loose face ===
Careful inspection reveals the two faces of the completed fiador knot, where the four strands emerge, are not identical. One has the appearance of a crown knot surrounding the emerging strands and is somewhat resistant to spreading when they are pulled apart. By comparison, the strands emerging from the other face of the knot are not nearly as well-contained and if pulled apart, the fiador knot easily distorts and splays. Depending on how the fiador knot is tied, these distinct faces can be positioned differently with respect to the side of the knot with the two loops and the side with a single loop and the two free ends.

While most sources fail to discuss and differentiate the two faces, those that do suggest the tight face is best oriented towards single loop and two free ends if the knot is to be used in a rope fiador. The rationale stated is that the single loop and free end side of the knot will be subject to more spreading when it passed around the neck of the horse. By contrast, the strands on the two-loop side of the fiador knot will generally be kept together by the double hackamore knot immediately below it.

Regardless of the original tying method, the orientation of the tight and loose faces can be swapped in the completed knot. By loosening the fiador knot, the tight face can be pressed towards, over, and around the rest of the knot. The knot will invert, "much the same as a mitten is turned inside out." When retightened, the tight and loose faces will have been exchanged.

== Uses by equestrians ==
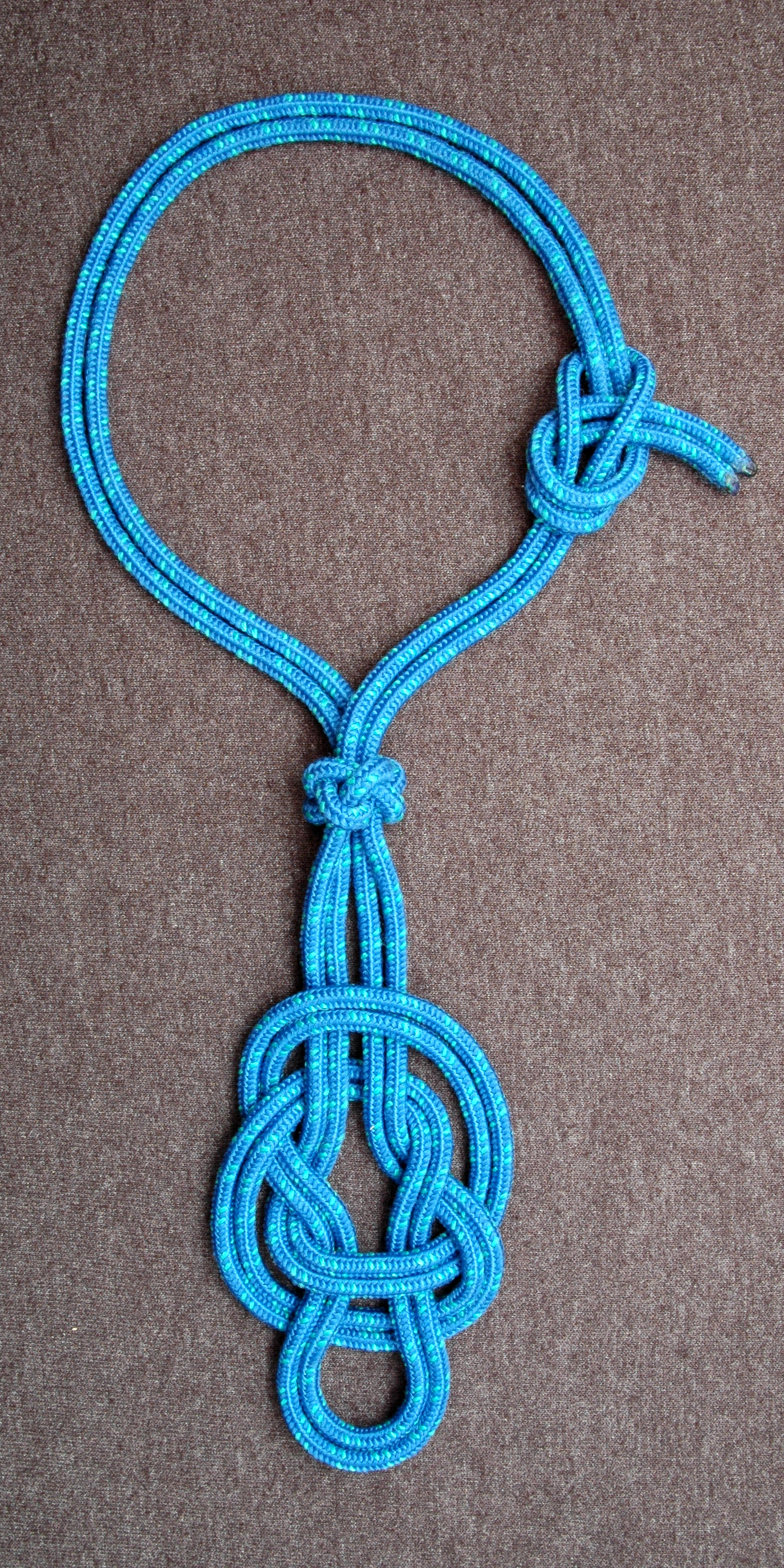
A mockup of the three knots used on a hackamore's fiador with the fiador knot in the center.

There are several ways the fiador knot is used with certain types of horse tack:

- The knot is used on, and shares its name with, the fiador of a hackamore. The fiador knot holds the four strands of the fiador together under the horse's jaw, while a doubled bottle sling—sometimes called a "hackamore knot" in this context—is used to attach the fiador to the heel knot of the bosal, or noseband, of the hackamore. A becket hitch is used to secure the fiador around the throatlatch of the horse. In North America, again according to Ashley, "...the method originated in the South American pampas and worked its way, via Mexico, to the Southwestern cow country, arriving there soon after the conclusion of the Spanish–American War."
- On knotted rope halters, the knot often is used under the jaw both as a decorative knot, and also to fashion the lower loop onto which a lead rope is attached. On a rope halter, the fiador knot is made from one continuous piece of rope, and is, along with a series of double overhand knots, one of two types of knots that comprise most rope halters.
- For one style of rope hobbles, a brass ring may be attached to the double loops on one side of the knot to join the hobble for the horse's other front foot. On the other side, a diamond knot terminates the two loose ends and the single loop is placed over this to encircle the horse's fetlock. A small rope slide (melted with a solder iron) on this single loop is pushed against the diamond knot to prevent the loop from slipping off the foot.

== See also ==
- List of knots
