= Bottle sling =

Type of knot

Bottle sling (Scoutcraft knot)
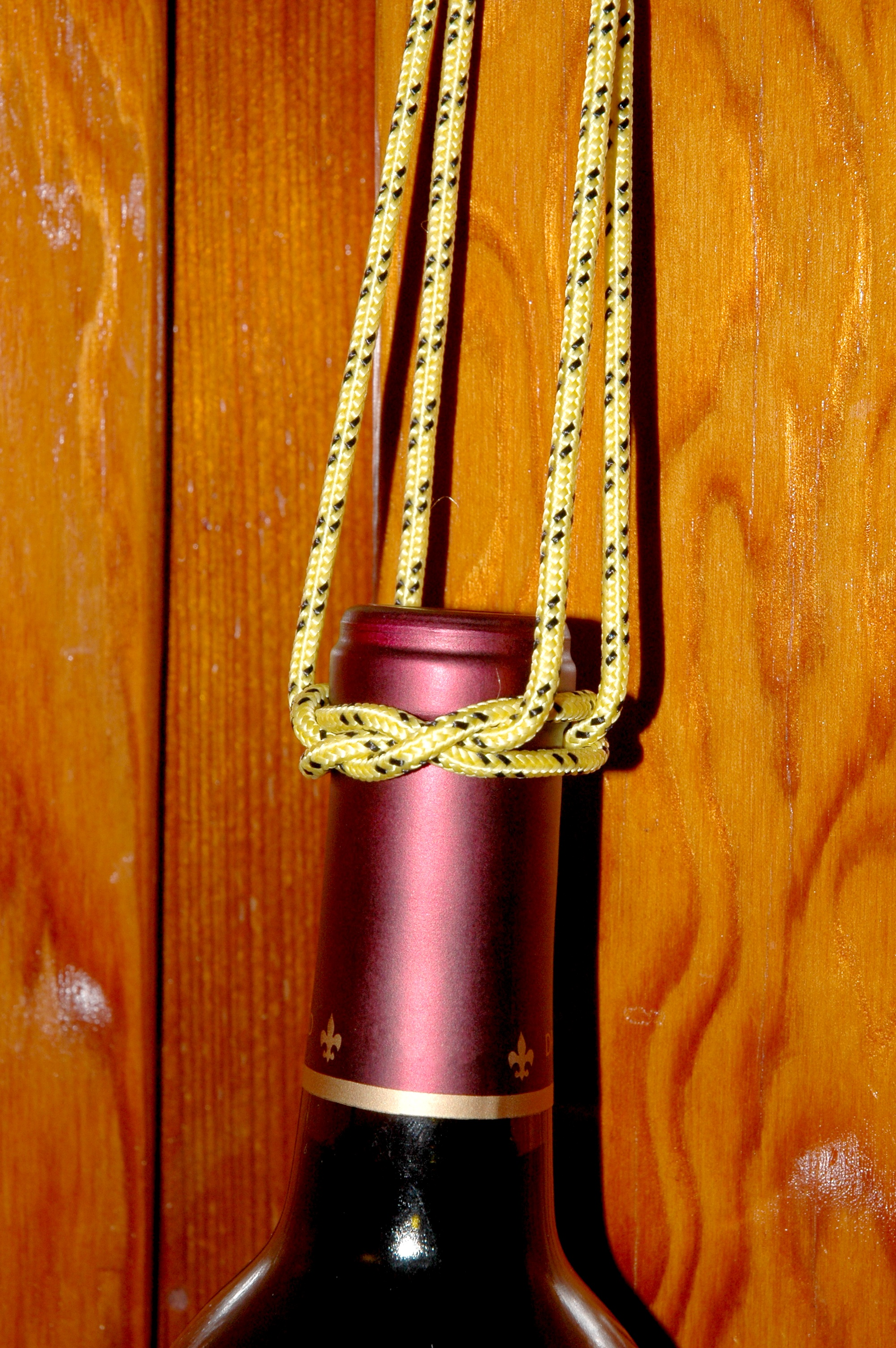
- Names: Bottle sling (Scoutcraft knot), Bottle knot, jug sling, jug knot, jar knot, moonshiner's knot, hackamore, hackamore knot, bridle knot, Beggarman's knot
- Category: Binding
- Origin: Ancient
- Related: Jury mast knot, miller's knot, Fiador knot
- Typical use: Suspending bottles and other similar objects
- Caveat: Cord must be scaled to size of bottle's flare or collar
- ABoK: #260, #1142, #2007, #2186, #2300, #2554

The bottle sling (also called a jug sling, a Hackamore knot, or a Scoutcraft knot) is a knot which can be used to create a handle for a glass or ceramic container with a slippery narrow neck, as long as the neck widens slightly near the top.

While classed with binding knots, such as the reef knot and miller's knot, the bottle sling is able to perform a function for which most other binding knots are unsuited. The bottle sling's specific form allows it to grip a cylinder, assuming it has even a slight flare or collar, and lift it along its axis when the knot is loaded by all four strands. With appropriate size cord, most wine bottles can be reliably suspended with this knot.

== History ==
The bottle sling was described in detail by the Greek physician Heraklas in his first century monograph on surgical knots and slings. It was included under the name diplous karkhesios brokhos ("double jug-sling noose"). Clearly familiar with the knot, Heraklas provided three distinct tying methods. Knot expert Cyrus L. Day believed the bottle sling was not described again in print until Craigin's 1884 A Boy's Workshop, although Clifford Ashley noted it was illustrated in Johann Röding's 1795 Allgemeines Wörterbuch der Marine ("General Dictionary of the Navy"). More recently, the bottle sling has been nationally recognized by the Boy Scouts of America as the symbol of Outdoor Skills by scout camps throughout the country.

== Usage ==
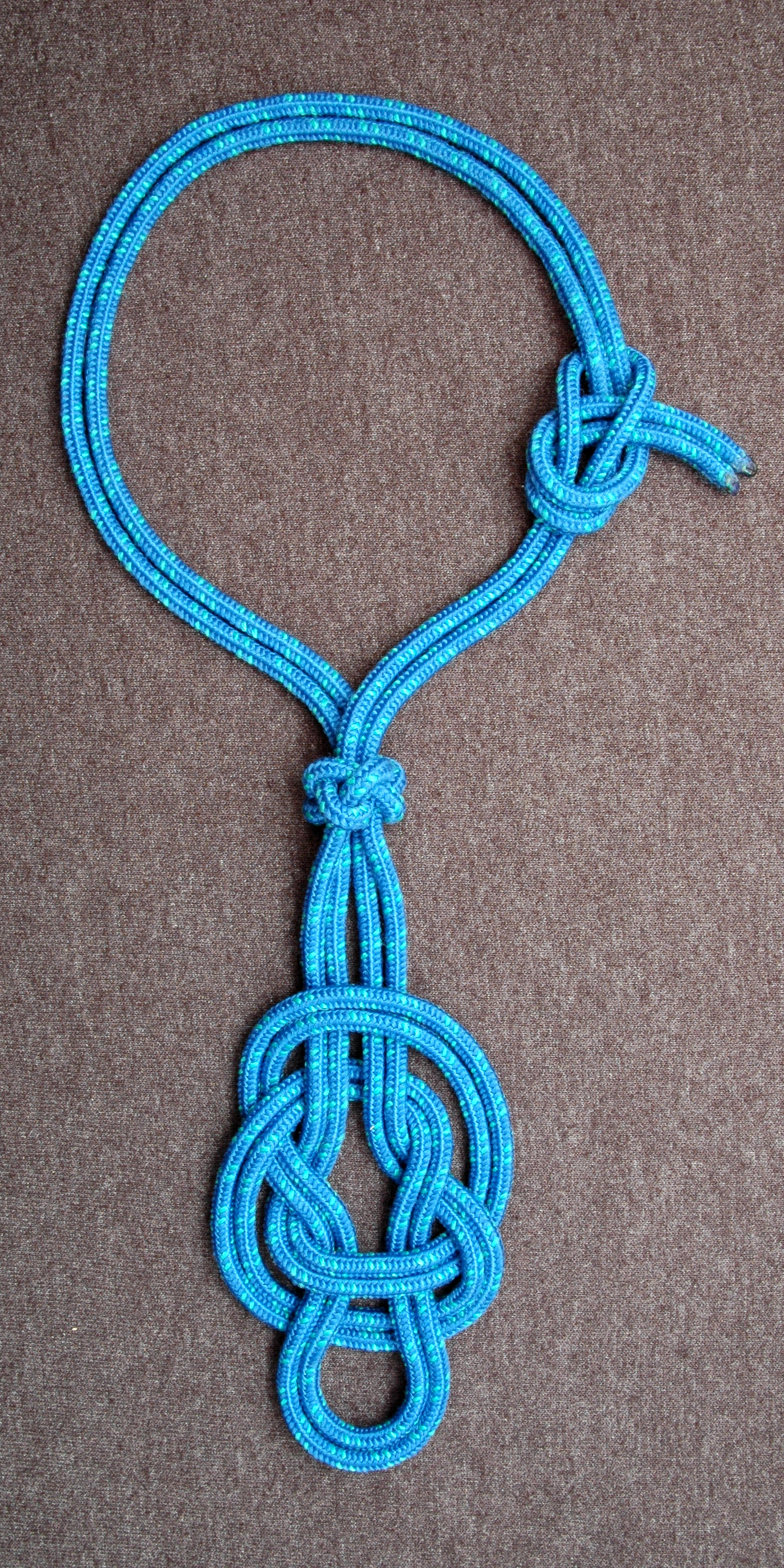
Mockup of a rope fiador with the doubled "hackamore knot" at the bottom

As the name suggests, the primary use for this knot is to suspend bottles, jugs, and other items with similar shapes. The space at the center of the knot is dropped over the top of a bottle or similar object. Firmly pulling on all four ends emerging from the knot tightens it against the neck of the bottle. Looping the running ends through the bight and tying them together will make a sling that grips and can be used to lift the bottle. This provides a convenient method of lowering a beverage bottle from a boat into the water to chill.

As mentioned above, the knot is believed to have been used medically in ancient Greece for applying traction in the reduction of fractures and dislocations. However it is not known to have any current medical application.

The knot is also said to have been used as an improvised emergency horse bridle when rope was the only material at hand. Its use is described with the central parts of the knot acting as a bit, one of the knot's outer bights passing over the top of the animal's muzzle, and the other passing under the jaw to form the noseband. The closed loop end of the knot would be placed over the animal's head and behind the ears, as a crownpiece, and the two free ends coming off under the chin used as reins. It was intended only for temporary use. However, at least one author has disputed this as "nonsense" and suggests its only proper equestrian use is in a doubled form, in this context known as a hackamore knot, to secure the fiador to the bosal in some hackamore designs.

== Tying ==
Perhaps not surprisingly—given three were already known to the ancient Greeks—there are many methods to tie the bottle sling. Swedish physiologist and knot researcher Hjalmar Öhrvall listed eight in his 1916 book Om Knutar ("About Knots").

One method for tying the bottle sling is similar to the loop-and-weave method used to tie the jury mast knot and the trumpet knot. The knot is begun by making a bight in a piece of rope and folding the bight back on itself to make two separated loops that are mirror images of each other. Lay one loop on top of the other so that they overlap slightly and create a cat's-eye-shaped hole above a triangular hole between the two loops. Make a bird's beak with your index and thumb and weave them down through the loop, up through the cat's eye and down through the bottom loop, bunching the coils of rope against your fingers. Pinch the section of rope that was the bottom of the triangle and flip the coils over the pinched section. The flip may take a little practice, but the pinched section should become a short bight hanging off a circular knot.

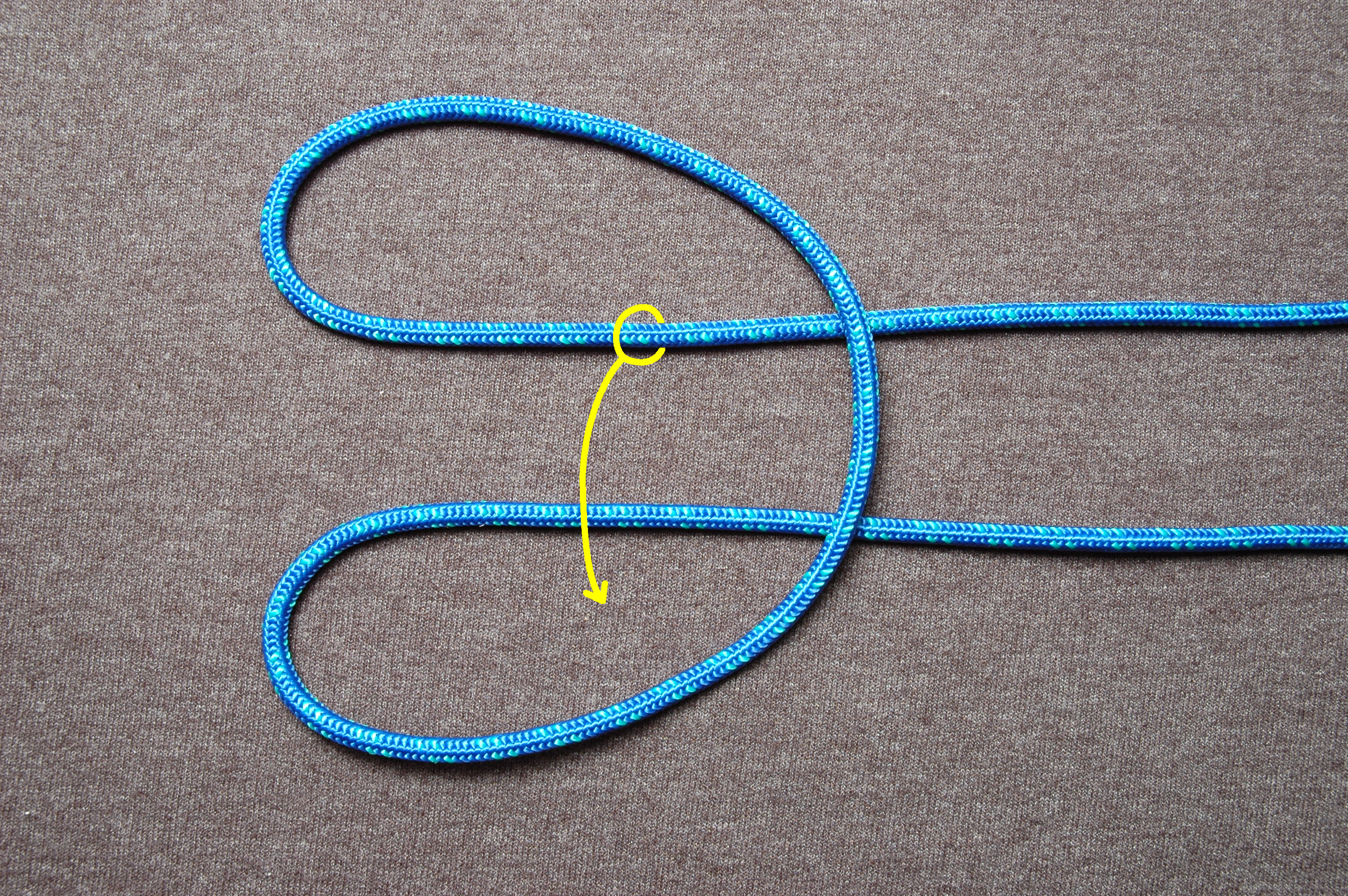
Overlapping the loops

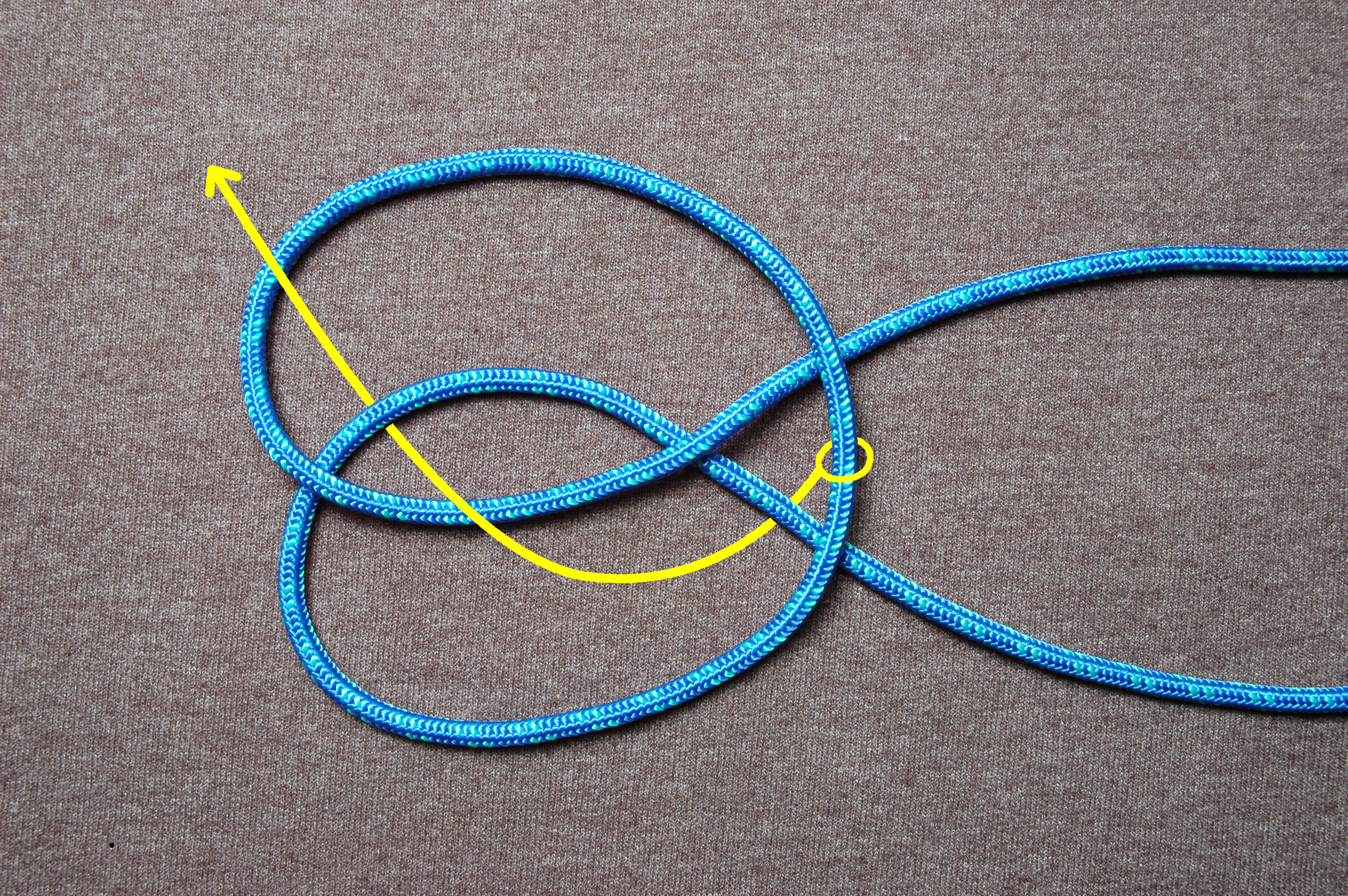
Path the bight takes through the cat's eye

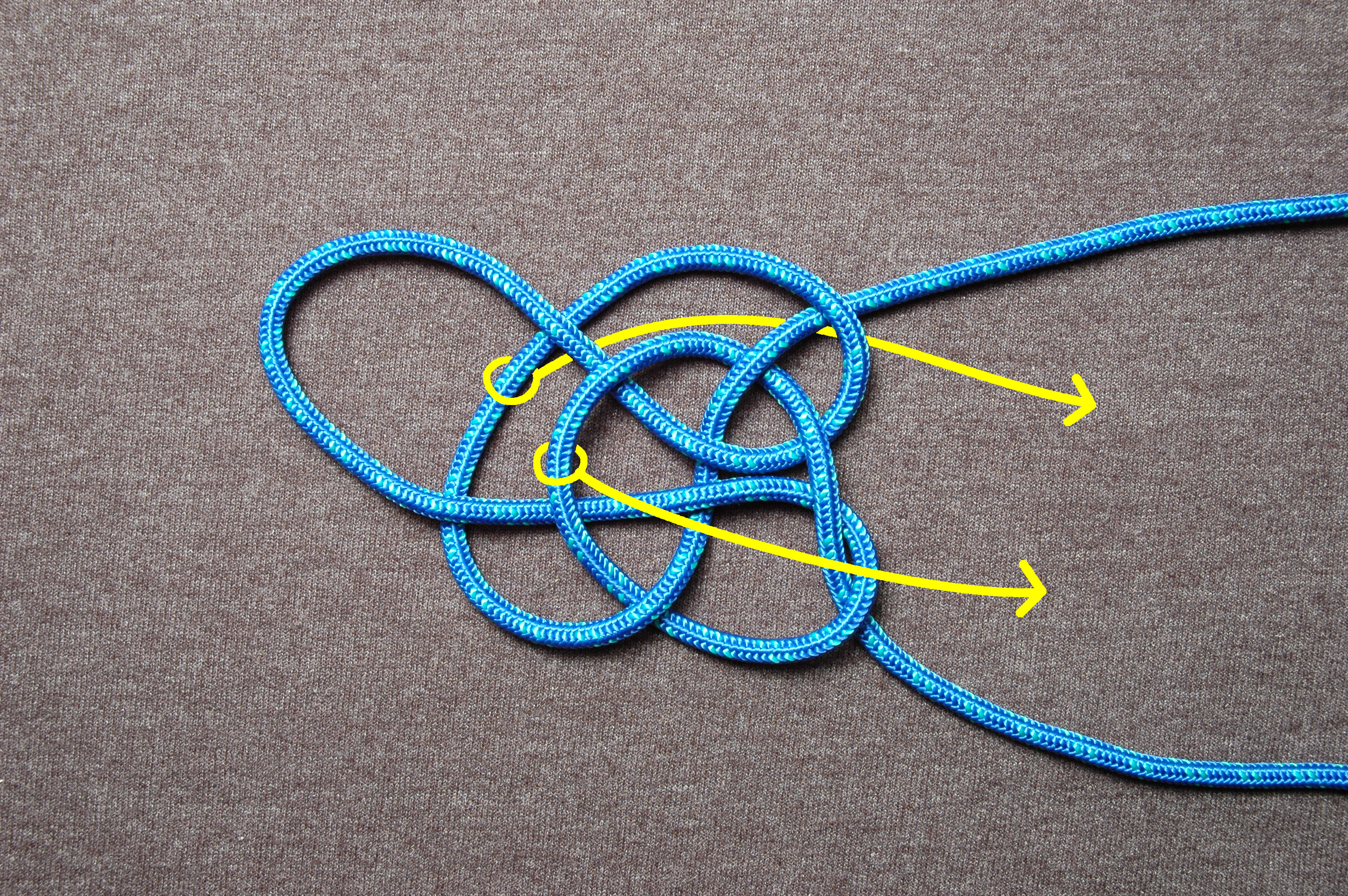
Flipping the knot

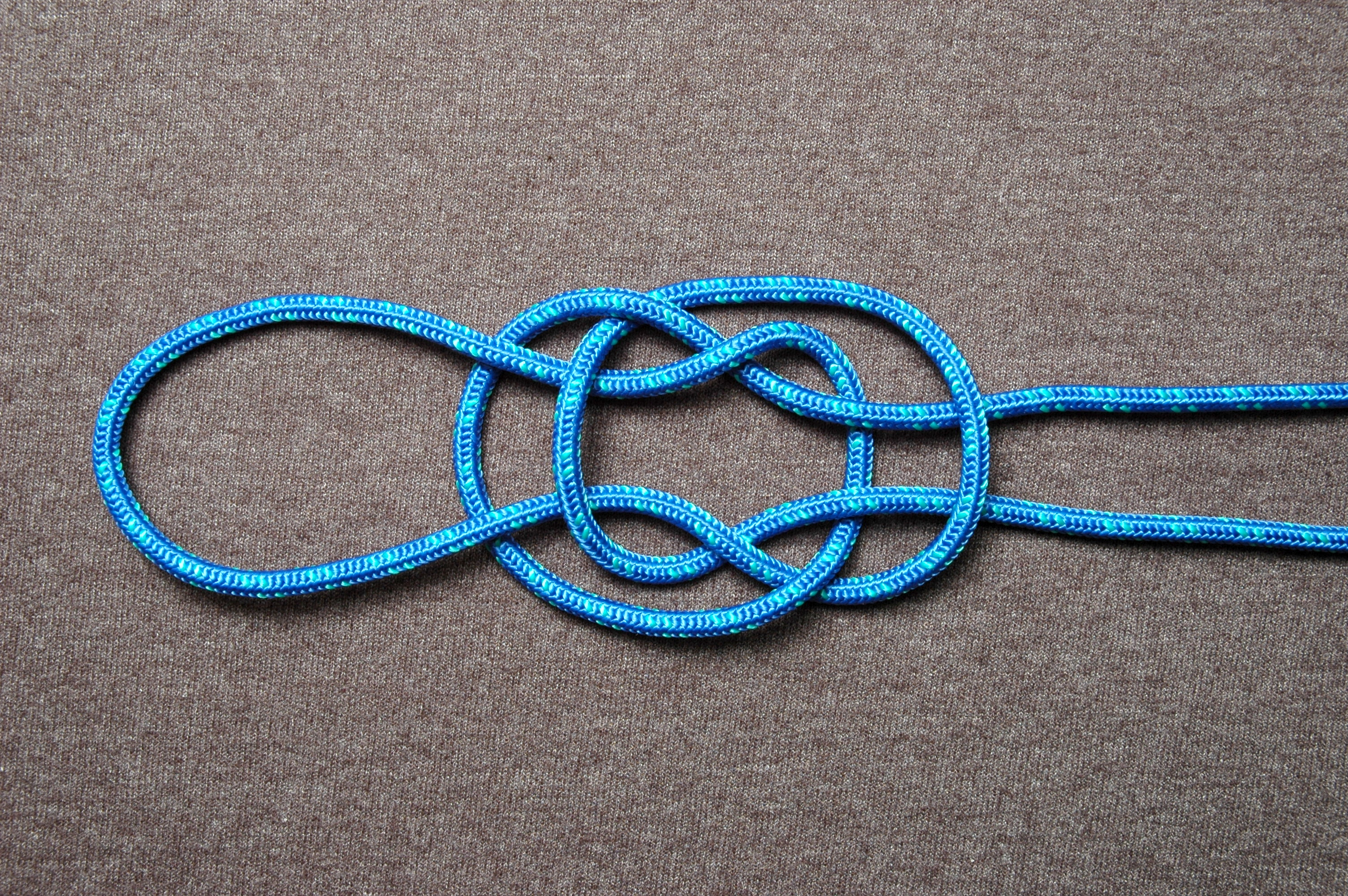
Final configuration

== See also ==
- Bottle cage
- List of binding knots
- List of knots
