= Fiador (tack) =

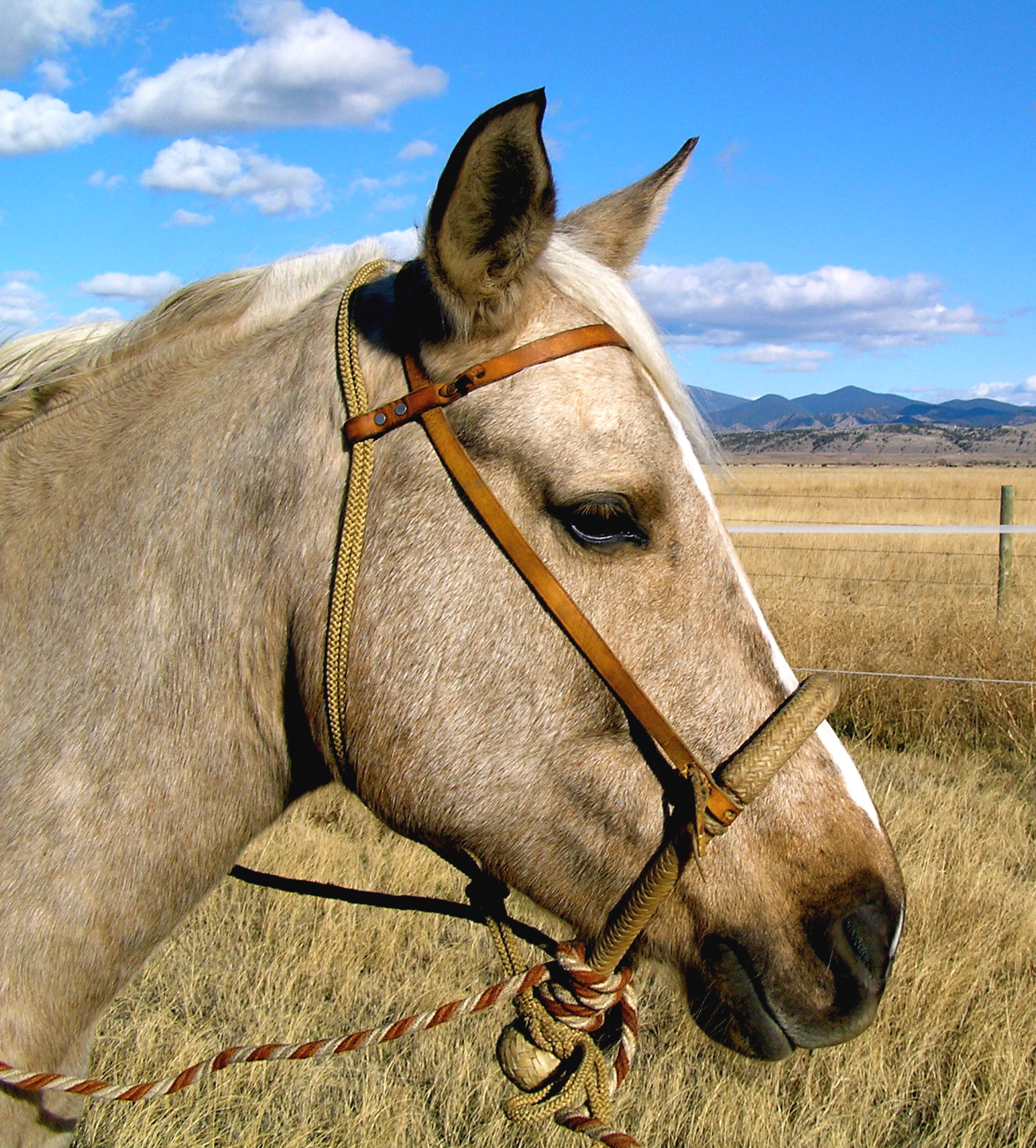
A bosal hackamore with fiador

A fiador (/ˈfiːədɔːr/) term of Spanish colonial origin referring to a hackamore component used principally in the Americas. In English-speaking North America, the fiador is known principally as a type of throatlatch used on the bosal-style hackamore. Its purpose is to stabilize a heavy noseband or bosal and prevent the bridle from shifting. It is not used for tying the horse.

A fiador-like design and fiador knot is also used under the jaw on some rope halters, usually ending in a loop to which a lead rope can be attached. This, however, is not an independent "fiador", nor generally labeled as such; it is simply an integral part of the halter itself.

== Origins ==
The origin of the word fiador in its equestrian sense is obscure but appears to be of Mexican or South American origin. In Spanish, the word fiador has numerous senses, all related to safekeeping. For example, an 18th-century Spanish—English dictionary defines fiador as surety, bail; he that is bound for another. In falconry, the small long line that is fastened to the hawk's leash when she is first lured, to bring her back at pleasure. ... also the loop of a cloak that comes about the neck to button, that it may not fall off. An early 19th century Portuguese—English dictionary also gives the senses of surety, bail, and falconry long line (creance). By the 1840s, the equestrian sense was in wide use in Mexico; in an 1844 article titled LOS RANCHEROS, Domingo Revilla defined and described the Mexican Jáquima, Bozal and Fiador, as follows:

“Jáquima is a kind of leather or horsehair bozal, secured with a harness of the same material, and at the base of the bozal that remains next to the horse's chin, there is a strap to further secure it, and it is called fiador. The bozalillo is just the bozal without harness or without a fiador. There are very curious jáquimas and bozalillos, and both are very necessary for the horse.”

Don Carlos Rincón Gallardo, 3rd Duke of Regla, 4th Marquess of Guadalupe, simply defined the fiador as: “the part that attaches the bozal to the throatlatch.”

By the mid 19th century (prior to the 1860s) it was also in use in Argentina, and it also appears in a 1911 dictionary of argentinismos.

== Styles ==
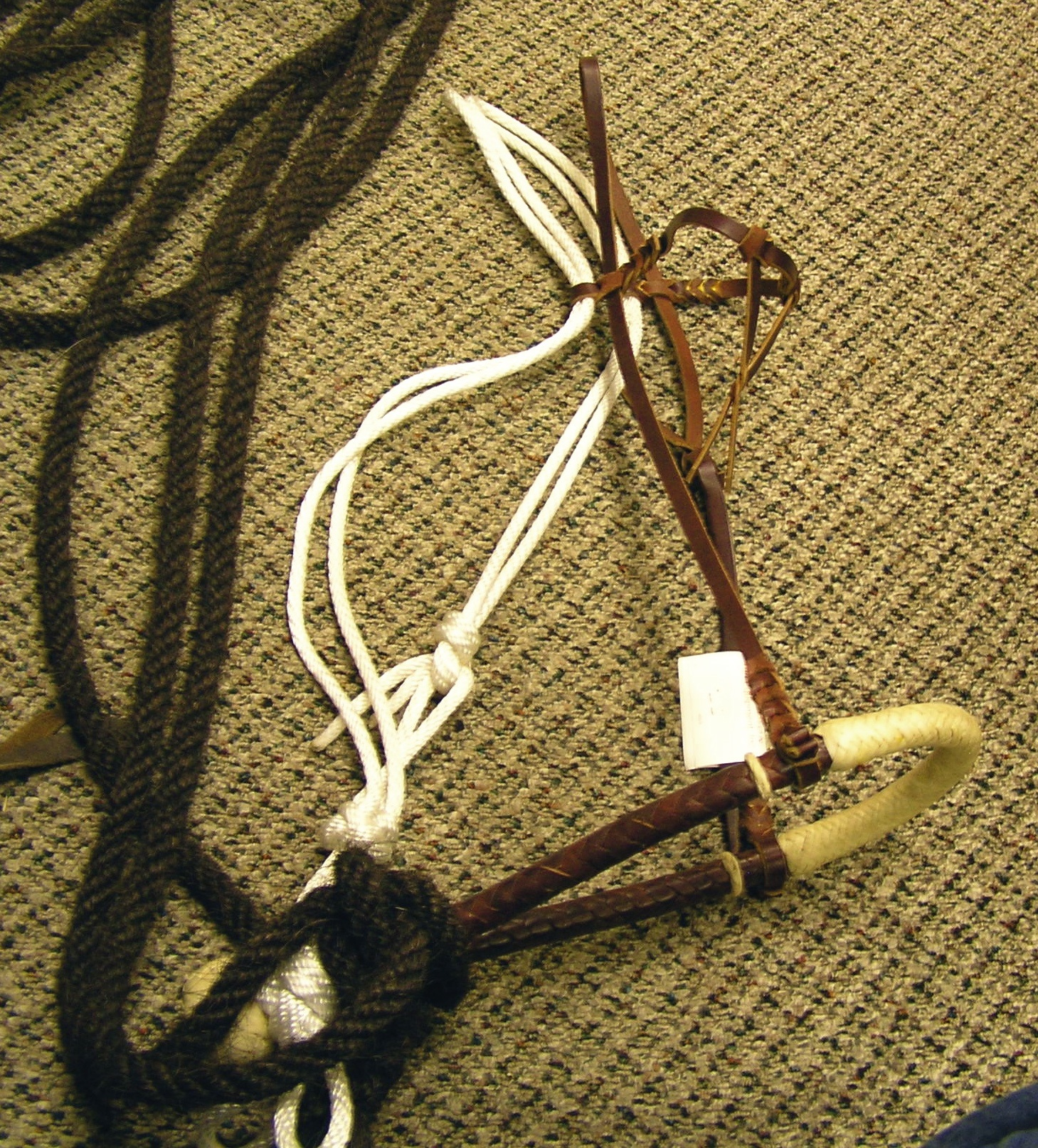
A bosal style hackamore with a fiador of white nylon rope

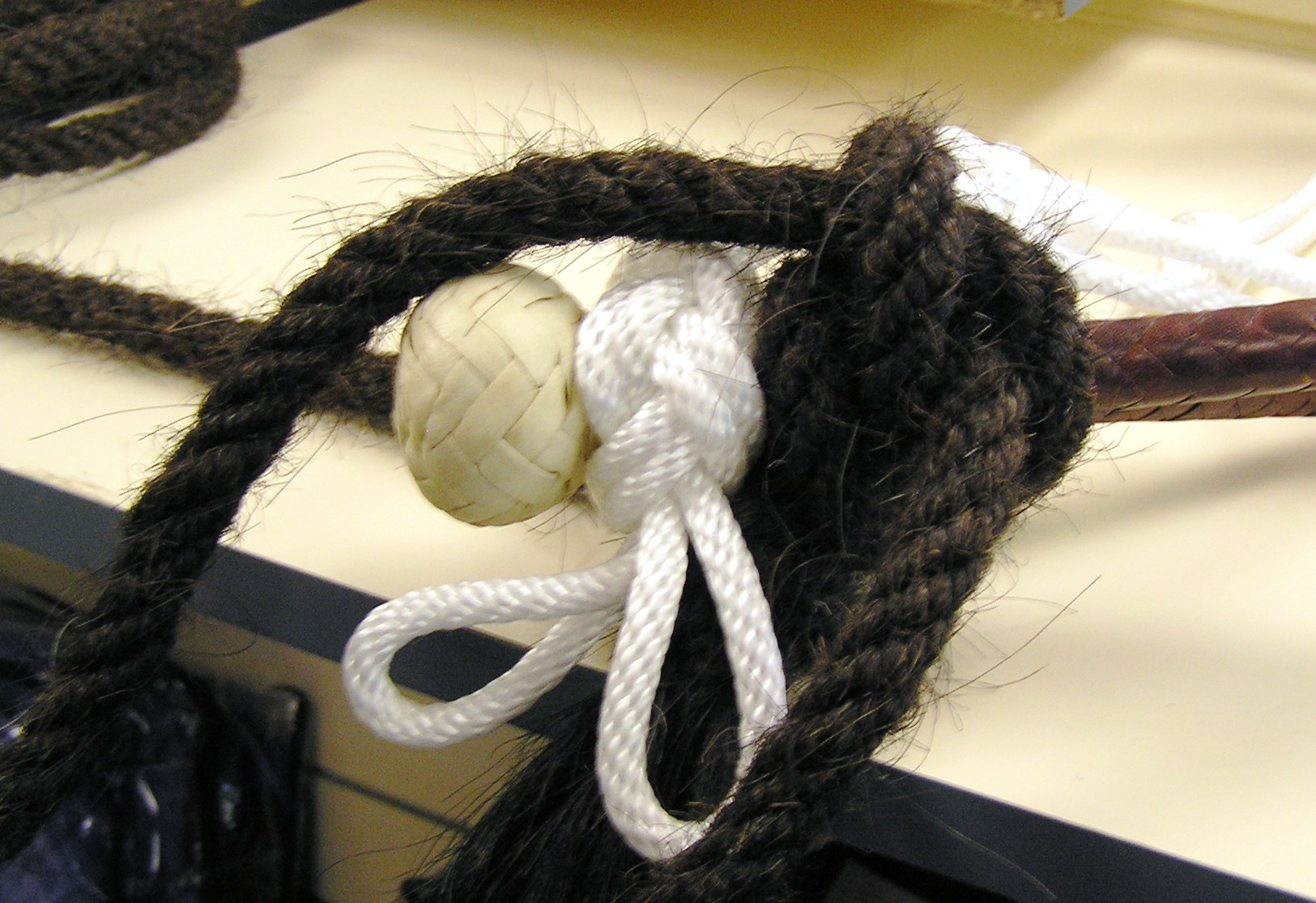
detail of the fiador tied onto the heel knot of a bosal with a bottle sling knot, attached below the mecate

The term fiador refers to different styles of equipment in different parts of the Western Hemisphere. In Mexico, the United States and Canada, the fiador is a type of throatlatch used on heavier styles of bosal hackamore. This design crosses over the horse's head at the poll, with a knot under the jawbone, and attaches to the hackamore at the noseband or bosal. The knot under the jaw is usually a fiador knot, and the fiador may have a second fiador knot at the point where it attaches to the heel knot of the bosal.

The fiador is attached to a headstall via a common (shared) browband, and its opposite end is tied to the bottom of a noseband or bosal, leaving a small loop. Seen in some nations on both bridles and hackamores, in Mexico, the United States and Canada it is used only on a bosal hackamore. This style of fiador functions as a throatlatch, and is attached either above or below the mecate reins. It is often made of cordage and tied in a fiador knot under the jaw. South American styles differ from those used in North America.

== Construction ==
In North America, a fiador is usually made from rope or cordage. Materials used may include horsehair, rawhide, cotton sash cord, or nylon. Cotton or nylon rope of approximately 6 mm diameter is the most common material. It runs behind the ears, over the poll of the horse, then joins under the cheeks with a fiador knot, or occasionally a Matthew Walker knot. There are two loops on the front end, and a loop and two tails on the back. The double loop runs forward to the heel knot of the bosal, where it is traditionally attached using what sailors call the bottle sling. The double tails from the backside of the knot pass over the poll, where they are passed through the remaining loop in a becket hitch below the left temple of the horse. The fiador can easily be detached from the headstall and, with somewhat more difficulty due to the need to untie the bottle sling knot, from the bosal.

In South America, a fiador is usually made of the same material as the rest of the halter or bridle, or of rawhide, and is fixed with a knotted button and button hole.

== Uses ==
In North America, a fiador is used most often on some bosal-style hackamores to stabilize a heavy bosal noseband on the horse's head. It is most often used within the "California" or vaquero tradition only when starting young horses with a heavy bosal, but is used throughout the hackamore phase of training horses within the "Texas" tradition of Western style riding. A bosal adjusted low on the horse's nose requires the fiador for proper balance, and also makes it easier to handle the horse on the ground when using the lead rope end of the mecate three rein system. A horse is not tied with a hackamore, even with a fiador, but rather, the fiador prevents the headgear from falling off the horse's head.

In Argentina, a fiador is seen on both halters and bridles, often together with a frentera. In Spain it is also used on bridles.

On rope halters, particularly designs that can also be used as a type of hackamore or bitless bridle, a fiador is fully incorporated into the headgear and is not detachable. The halter is used with a mecate or reins, which are attached to the fiador loop that hangs below the chin.
