= Mecate rein =

Horse tack

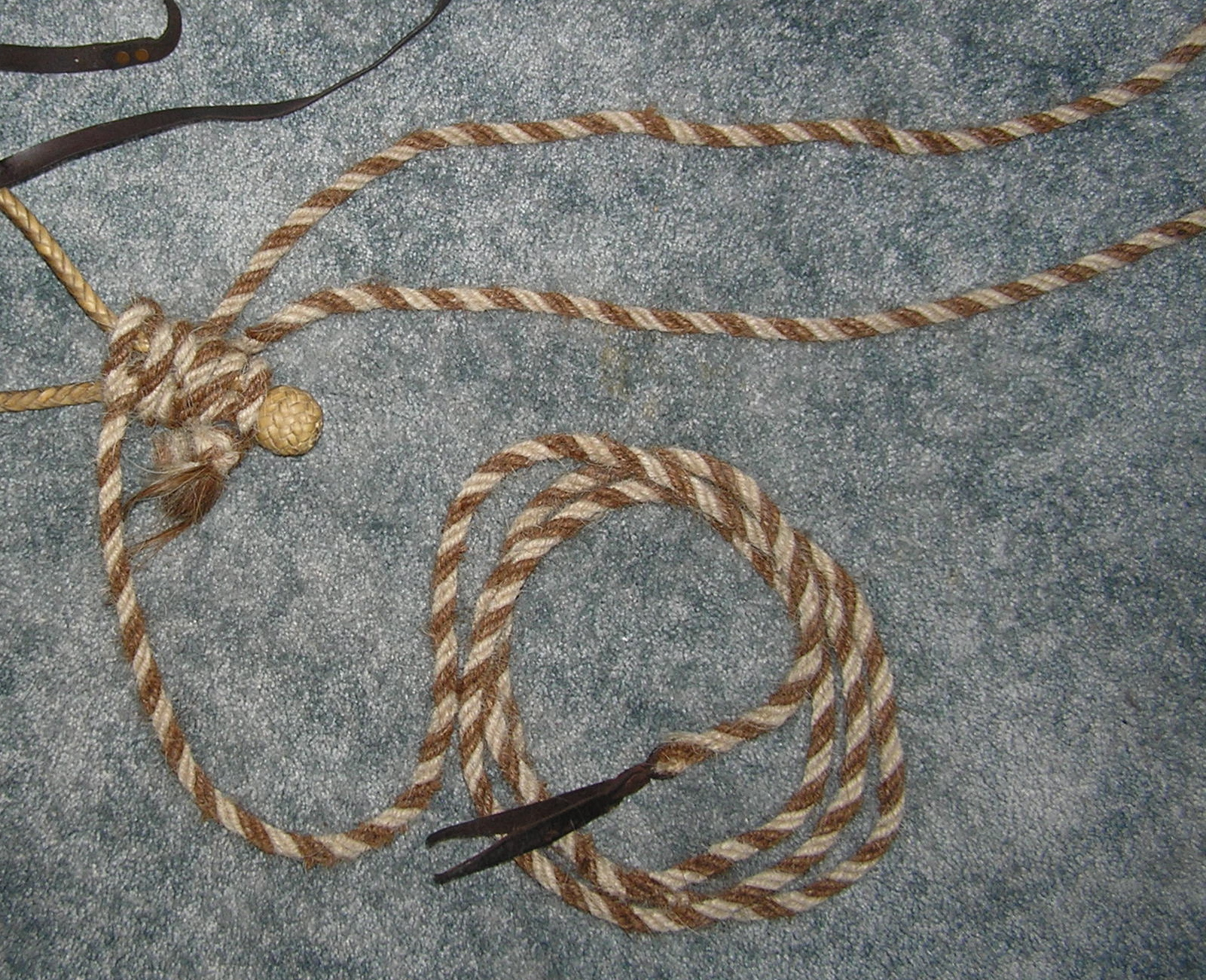
A traditional horsehair mecate tied to a bosal. Leather popper is on lead rein end, paired extension forms a looped rein, horsehair tassel marks end attached to bosal

The mecate (/məˈkɑːtiː/ or less anglicized /məˈkɑːteɪ/; Spanish pronunciation: [meˈkate]) is the rein system of the bosal style hackamore used to train young horses. It is a long rope, traditionally of horsehair, approximately 20–25 feet long and up to about 3/4 inch in diameter. It is tied to the bosal in a specialized manner that adjusts the fit of the bosal around the muzzle of the horse, and creates both a looped rein and a long free end that can be used for a number of purposes. When a rider is mounted, the free end is coiled and attached to the saddle. When the rider dismounts, the lead rein is not used to tie the horse to a solid object, but rather is used as a lead rope and a form of Longe line when needed.

The traditional mecate was an integral part of the vaquero culture that became the California tradition of western riding. The classic mecate is hand-braided of horsehair, usually long hair from the tail, often a blend of black and white hairs made into an alternating design. Modern mecates are made not only of horsehair, but also of synthetic rope, usually of a solid dark color, sometimes with a horsehair tassel at one end and a leather popper or quirt at the other.

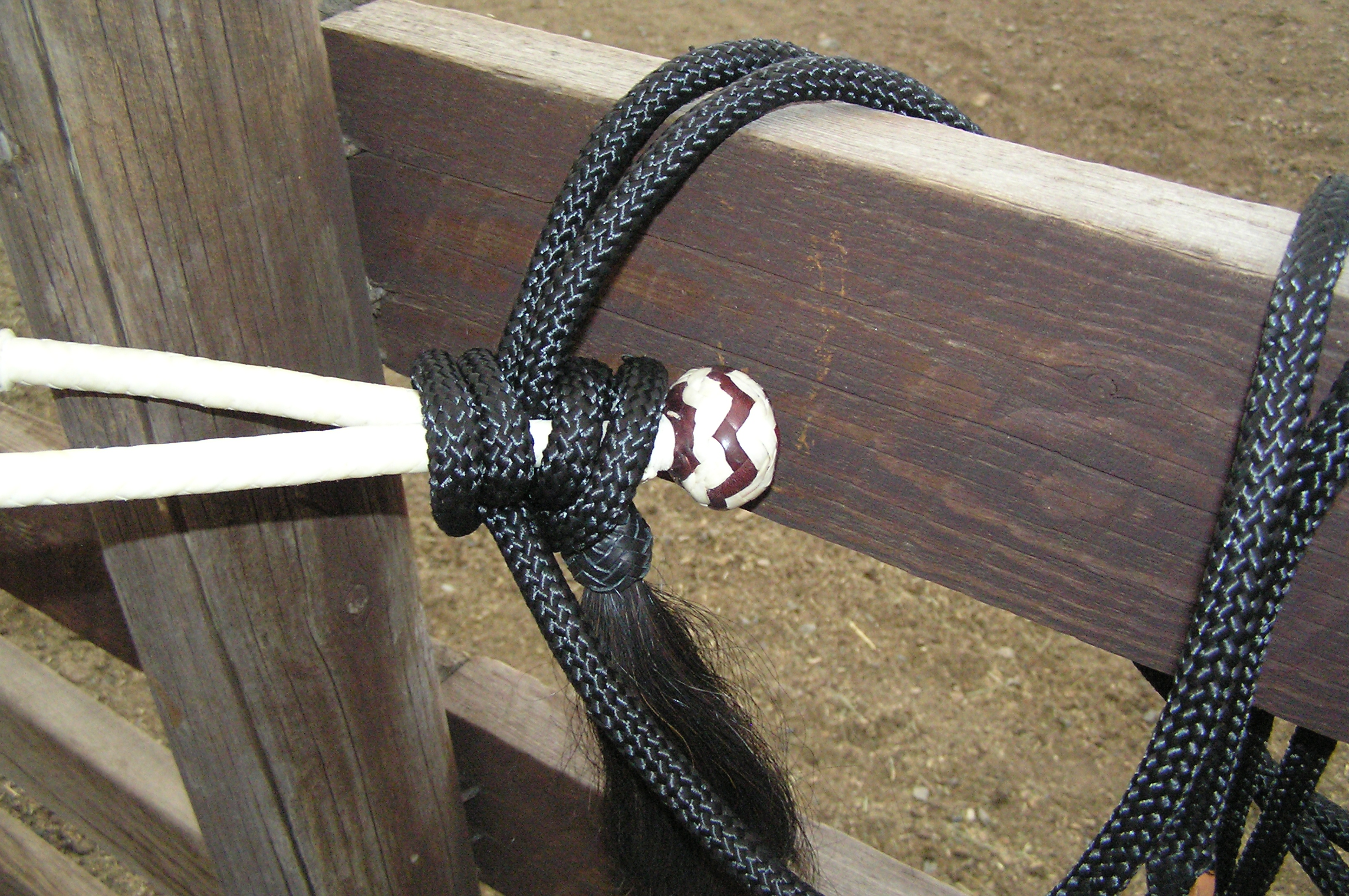
A close view of the mecate knot. Additional wraps can be added or removed to change the adjustment of the bosal

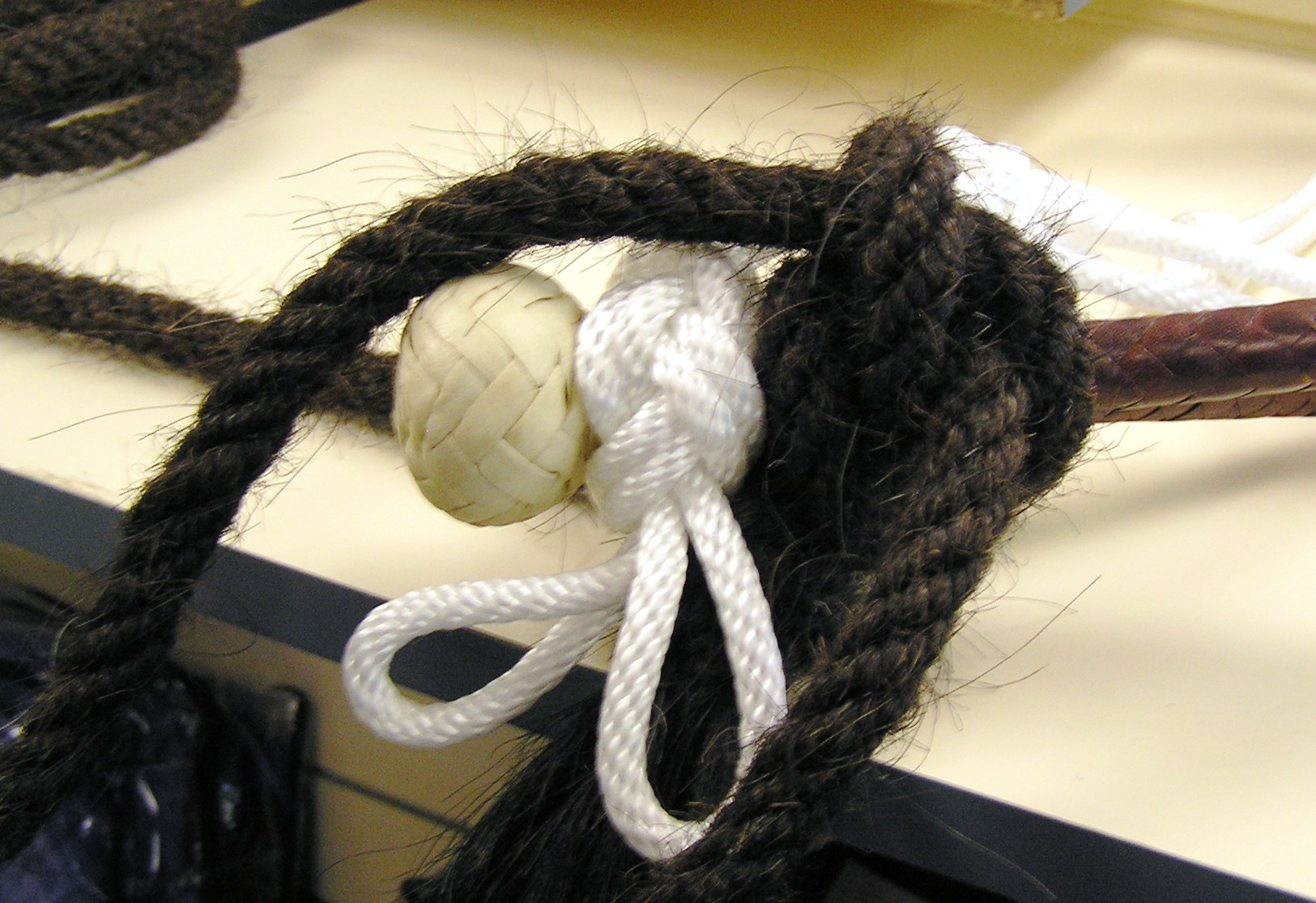
Detail of a horsehair mecate tied next to a fiador on a bosal

A mecate knot begins at the heel knot of the bosal, where the mecate is anchored with a wrap of rope similar to the clove hitch. Next, the looped rein is formed coming off the top of the bosal. Then, the loose end is wrapped two or more times in front of the rein loop until the bosal is the proper diameter to fit the horse, and secured with another clove hitch, leaving the long lead rein end coming out the bottom of the bosal, secured by the last wrap. A properly tied mecate knot allows wraps of rope to be added to the knot in front of the rein loop in order to tighten the bosal noseband on a horse, or the rope can be unwrapped to loosen the bosal. Sometimes, a heavy bosal is stabilized by the addition of a fiador, which is a type of throatlatch usually made of thin cotton rope. The fiador attaches in front of the mecate so as to not interfere with the action of the reins. The mecate may need to be loosened to accommodate the fiador if used.

A variation, sometimes called "mecate reins" and other times a "McCarty" or "McCarthy outfit," is used as a rein system for a bridle with a bit. This design, usually of cotton rope or web, consists of a single looped rein attached to either site of a snaffle bit with a lead rein coming off of the left bit ring in a manner similar to the lead rein of the traditional mecate. This setup is most often seen today among some practitioners of the natural horsemanship movement. Sometimes considered an adaptation of the California tradition to the Texas tradition, it allows the rider to hold on to the horse while on the ground, but the drawback to the design is that the lead rein comes off of one side of the bit, creating an imbalance in the horse's mouth. To balance the lead rein, some users add a large tassle on the bight off the other side of the bit. The lead rein also cannot be used for longing the horse in both directions, as it is attached only on the left.

== See also ==
- Hackamore
- Bosal
- Rein
- Cowboy
