= Hackamore, California =

Unincorporated community in California, United States

Hackamore
- Unincorporated community
- Location in California Hackamore (the United States)
- Coordinates: 41°33′07″N 121°07′25″W
- Country: United States
- State: California
- County: Modoc
- Elevation: 4,705 ft (1,434 m)

Hackamore (formerly Jaquina) is an unincorporated community in Modoc County, California, United States. It is located on the Southern Pacific Railroad, 30 miles (48 km) west of Alturas, at an elevation of 4705 feet (1434 m).

A post office operated at Hackamore from 1903 (having been transferred from Stobie) to 1904.

Hackamore was the site of a Civilian Conservation Corps camp during the 1930s. Camp residents built many miles of roads and telephone lines in the region and assisted in the mapping of Lava Beds National Monument.
