= Hackamore =

Type of animal headgear

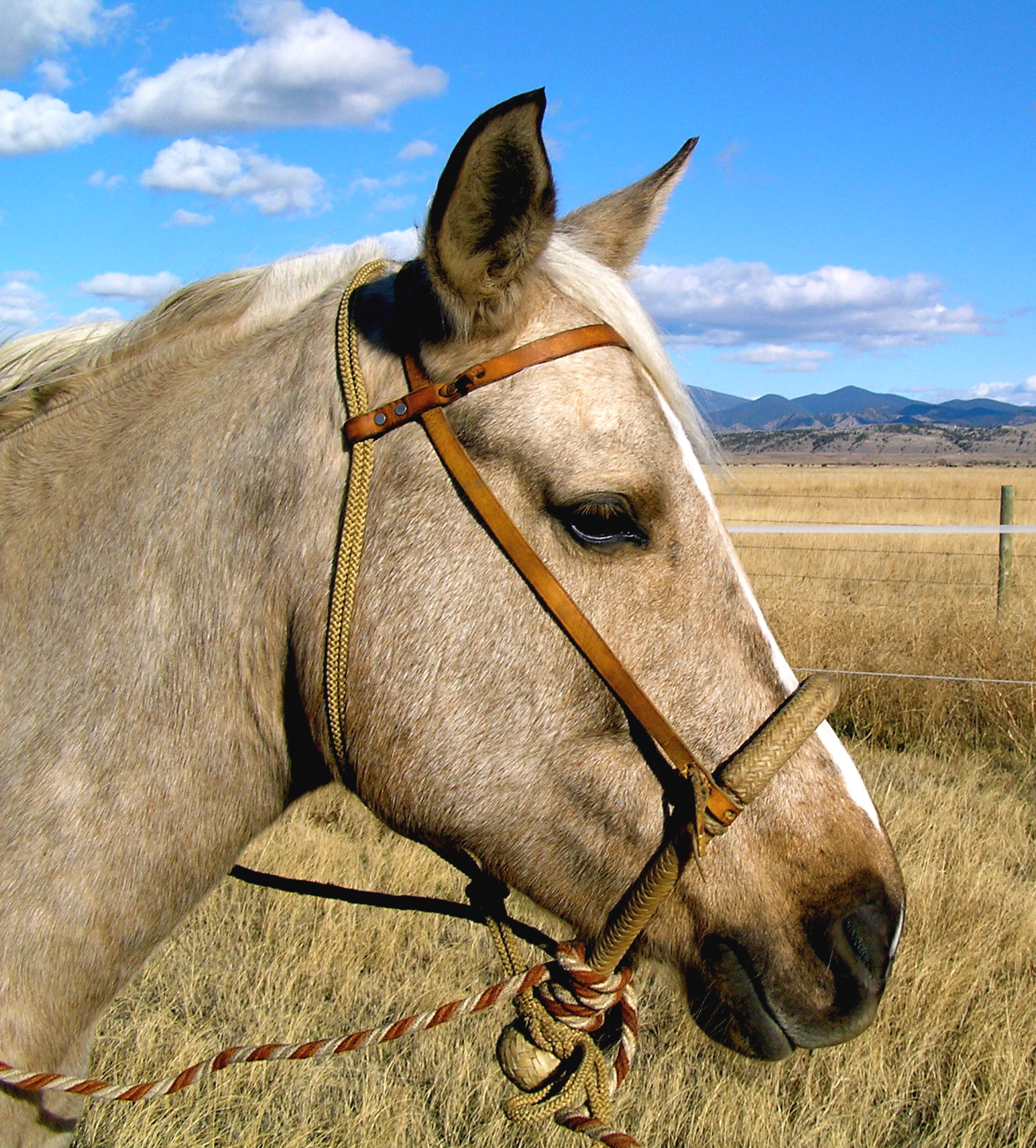
A horse wearing a bosal hackamore with a fiador

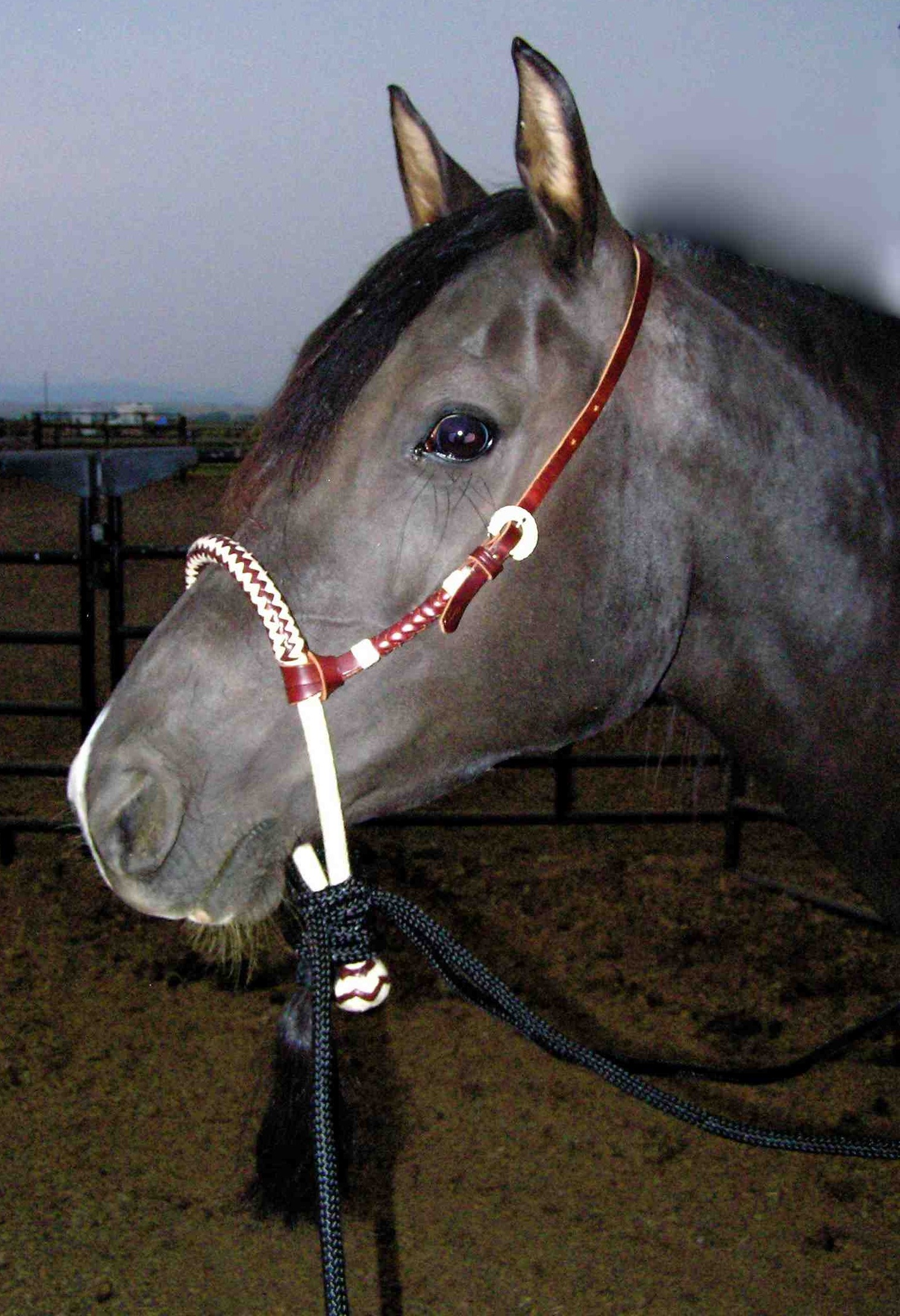
A horse wearing a bosal-style hackamore

A hackamore (or jáquima) is a type of horse headgear which does not have a bit. Instead, it has a special type of noseband that works on pressure points on the face, nose, and chin. Hackamores are most often seen in western riding and other styles of riding derived from Spanish traditions, and are occasionally seen in some English riding disciplines such as show jumping and the stadium phase of eventing. Various hackamore designs are also popular for endurance riding. While usually used to start young horses, they are often seen on mature horses with dental issues that make bit use painful, and on horses with mouth or tongue injuries that would be aggravated by a bit. Some riders also like to use them in the winter to avoid putting a frozen metal bit into a horse's mouth.

There are many styles, but the classic hackamore design features a bosal (bozal) noseband, and sometimes is itself called a "bosal" or a "bosal hackamore". It has a long rope rein called a mecate and may also add a type of stabilizing throatlatch called a fiador, which is held to the hackamore by a browband. Other designs with heavy nosebands are also called hackamores, though some bitless designs with lighter weight nosebands that work off tension rather than weight are also called bitless bridles. A noseband with shanks and a curb chain to add leverage is called a mechanical hackamore, but is not considered a true hackamore. A simple leather noseband, or cavesson, is not a hackamore; a noseband is generally used in conjunction with a bit and bridle.

Like a bit, a hackamore can be gentle or harsh, depending on the hands of the rider. The horse's face is very soft and sensitive with many nerve endings. Misuse of a hackamore can not only cause pain and swelling on the nose and jaw, but improper fitting combined with rough use can cause damage to the cartilage on the horse's nose.

== Origins ==
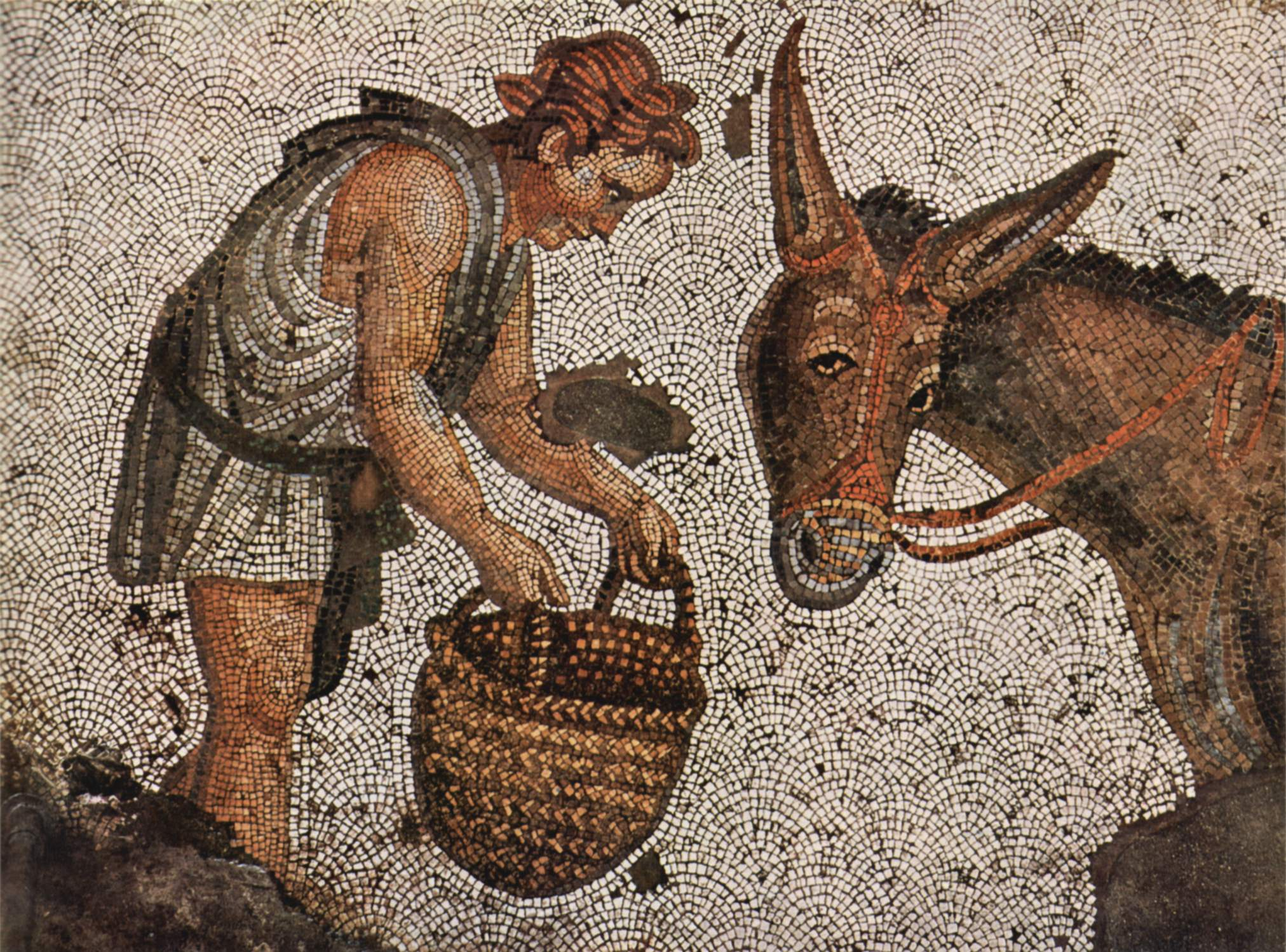
5th century AD Eastern Roman mosaic from the emperor's palace in Constantinople

The word "hackamore" is derived from the Spanish word jáquima, meaning headstall or halter, itself derived from Old Spanish xaquima. The Spanish had obtained the term from the Arabic šakīma, (bit), from šakama (to bridle). From the Americanized pronunciation of jaquima, the spelling "hackamore" entered the written English language by 1850, not long after the Mexican–American War.

The first hackamore was probably a piece of rope placed around the nose or head of a horse not long after domestication, perhaps as early as 4,000 BC. Early devices for controlling the horse may have been adapted from equipment used to control camels. Over time, more sophisticated means of using nose pressure were developed. The Persians beginning with the reign of Darius, c. 500 BC, were one of the first cultures known to have used a thick-plaited noseband to help the horse look and move in the same direction. This device, called a hakma, also added a third rein at the nose, and was an innovation that allowed a rider to achieve collection by helping the horse flex at the poll joint. The third rein later moved from the top of the noseband to under the chin, where it is still part of the modern mecate rein used on the bosal-style hackamore. The techniques of horse-training refined by the Persians later influenced the works on horsemanship written by the Greek military commander Xenophon.

This heavy noseband itself came to be known by many names, retaining the name hakma in Persio-Arabic tongues, but becoming the cavesson in French, the cavezzone or capezzone in Italy, the cabezon or media caña in Spain, and bozal or bosal in Mexico. Another modern descendant is the modern longeing cavesson which includes a heavy noseband with a rein at the nose, but it is used for longeing, not for riding.

Some historic designs, when pulled, tightened over the nostrils, creating control by restricting the horse's wind. Metal was used in some designs, a predecessor to the Spanish serreta, a metal noseband with teeth. In general, the hackamore commonly was used on the initial ridings of a horse which was in the process of being broken.

In 18th-century Spain, a jáquima was the bridle used for riding on donkeys and mules. The tradition of hackamore use in the United States came from the Spanish Californians, who were well respected for their horse-handling abilities. English journalist and artist, William Redmond Ryan (1823–1855), described the Californio method for taming horses using a jáquima, which he calls “hackamore”, while living in California in the 1840s. From this tradition, the American cowboy adopted the hackamore and two schools of use developed: The "buckaroo" or "California" tradition, most closely resembling that of the original vaqueros, and the "Texas" tradition, which melded some Spanish technique with methods from the eastern states, creating a separate and unique style indigenous to the region. Today, it is the best known of the assorted "bitless bridling" systems of controlling the horse.

In 1844, Domingo Revilla defined and described the jáquima used in Mexico as follows:"Jáquima is a kind of leather or horsehair bozal, secured with a harness of the same material, and at the base of the bozal that remains next to the horse's chin, there is a strap to further secure it, and it is called a fiador. The bozalillo is just the bozal without harness or without a fiador. There are very curious jáquimas and bozalillos, and both are very necessary for the horse." In his book Vocabulario de Mexicanismos (1899), Mexican historian and philologist Joaquín García Icazbalceta defined the bozal or bozalillo (known as a "bosalita" in the US) as: "Bozalillo: It is not a diminutive of Bozal, but a kind of fine jáquima made of twisted horsehair that is placed under the bridle of the horses; and from the part that surrounds the mouth hangs the falsarrienda [false reins]. It replaces the serrated cavesson, not used here."

== Types ==
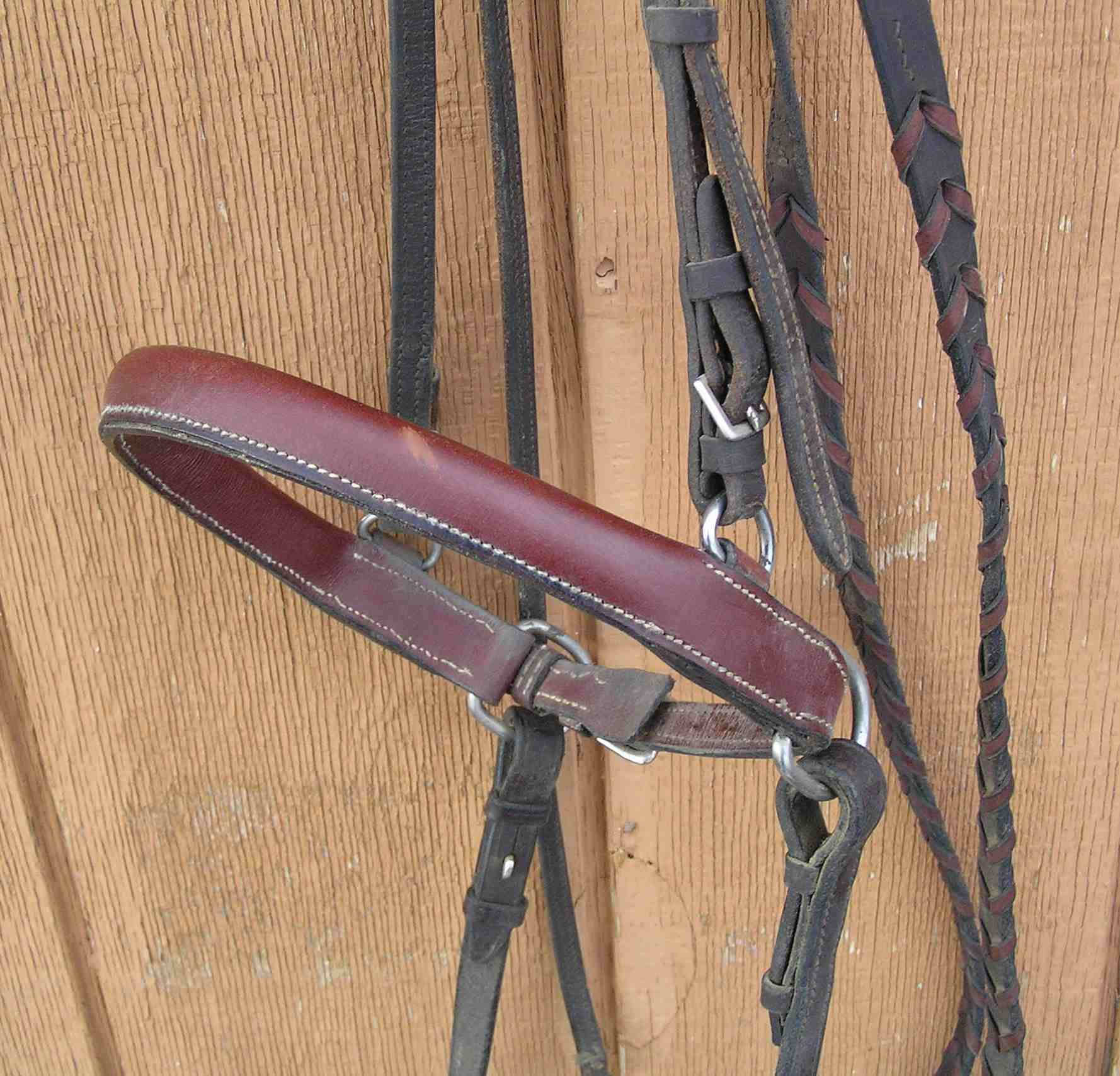
An English style jumping cavesson

The word "hackamore" has been defined many ways, both as a halter and as a type of bitless bridle. However, both terms are primarily descriptive. The traditional jaquima hackamore is made up of a headstall, bosal and mecate tied into looped reins and a lead rope. It is neither precisely a halter nor simply a bridle without a bit. "Anyone who makes the statement that a hackamore is just another type of halter ... is simply admitting that he knows nothing about this fine piece of equipment."

Today, hackamores can be made of leather, rawhide, rope, cable or various plastics, sometimes in conjunction with metal parts. The main types are the classic bosal and the more modern sidepull, though other designs based on nose pressure loosely fall into this category. Other assorted designs of bitless headgear, often classed as "bitless bridles", are not true hackamores. These include the "cross-under" bitless bridle, which uses strap tension to control the horse, and the mechanical "hackamore", which has leverage shanks.

=== Bosal ===
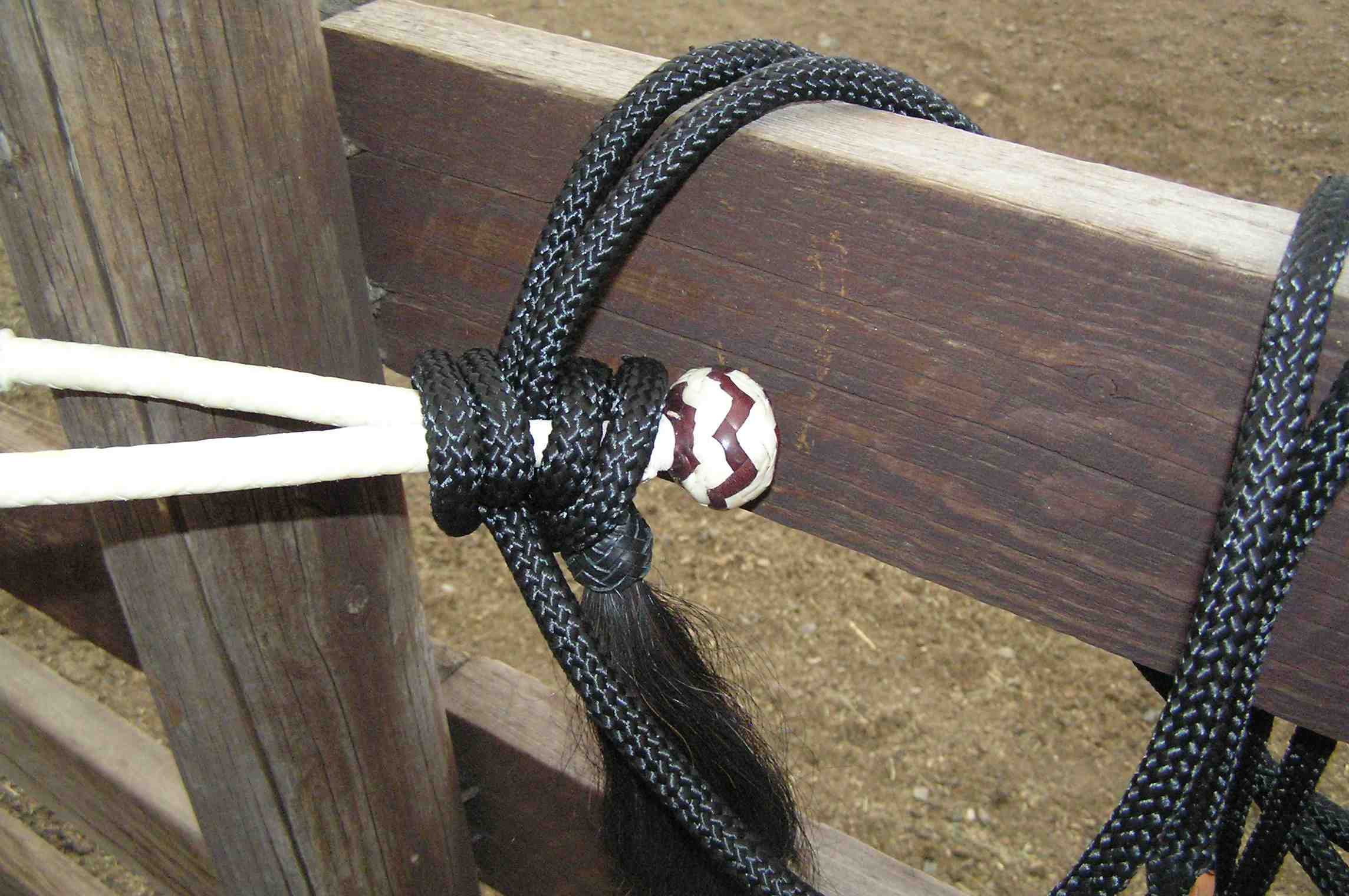
Close-up detail of a nylon rope mecate tied onto the bosal. Note looped reins and a lead rope all come off of the knot.

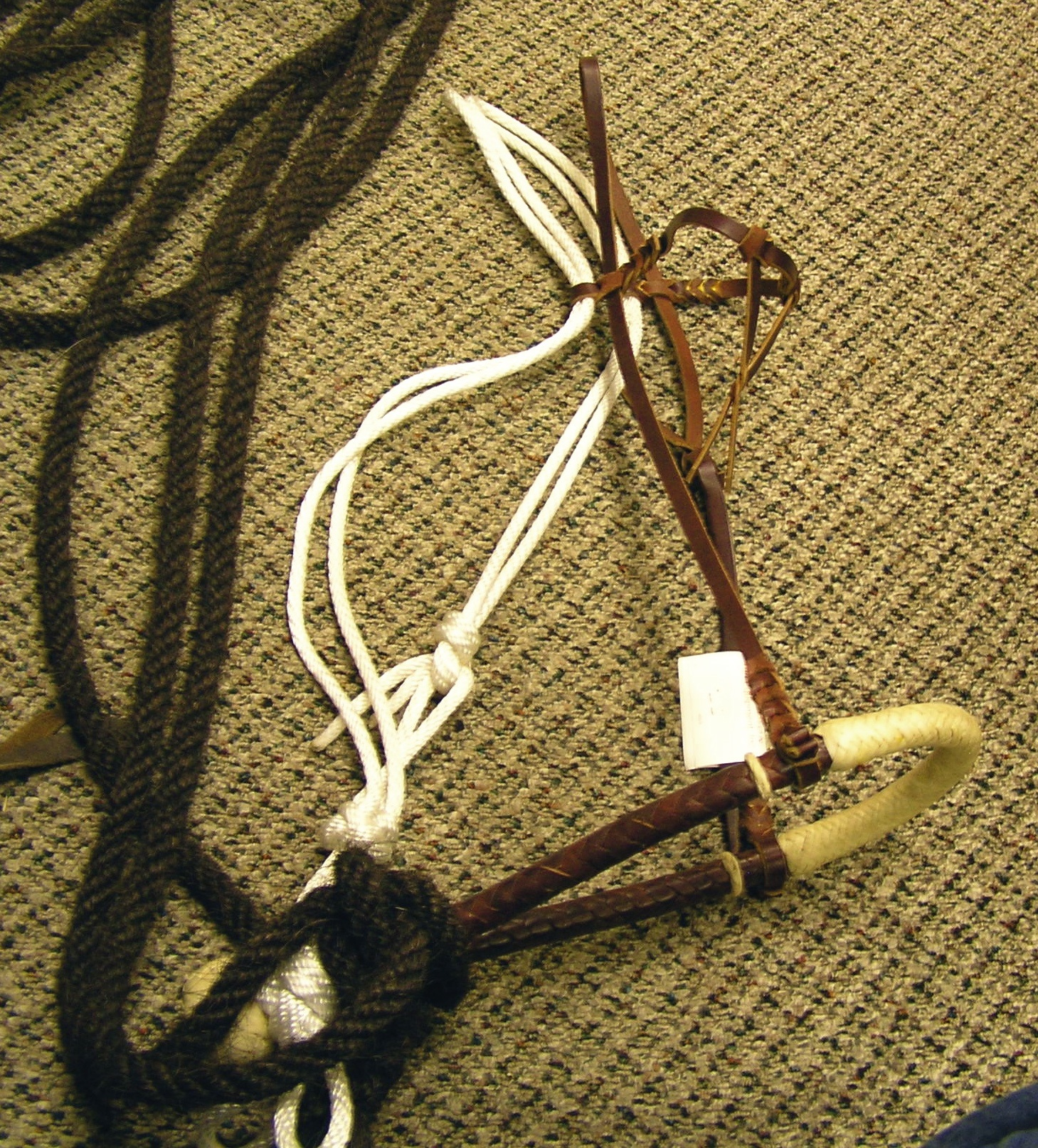
A bosal hackamore with horsehair mecate and a fiador made of white nylon rope)

The bosal (/boʊˈsɑːl/, /boʊˈsæl/ or /ˈboʊsəl/; Spanish pronunciation: [boˈsal]) (bozal) is the noseband element of the classic jaquima or true hackamore. The bosal is seen primarily in western-style riding. It is derived from the Spanish tradition of the vaquero. It consists of a fairly stiff rawhide noseband with reins attached to a large knot or "button" (Sp. bosal) at the base from which the design derives its name. The reins are made from a specially tied length of rope called a mecate (/məˈkɑːteɪ/ in this usage; Spanish pronunciation: [meˈkate]), which is tied in a specific manner to both adjust the size of the bosal, and to make a looped rein with an extra length of rope that can be used as a lead rope. In the Texas tradition, where the bosal sets low on the horse's face, and on very inexperienced ("green") horses in both the California (vaquero) and Texas traditions, a specialized rope throatlatch called a fiador /ˈfiːədɔːr/ is added, running over the poll to the bosal, attached to the hackamore by a browband. The fiador keeps a heavy bosal properly balanced on the horse's head without rubbing or putting excess pressure on the nose. However, it also limits the action of the bosal, and thus is removed once the horse is comfortable under saddle. The terms mecate and fiador have at times been Americanized as "McCarty" or "McCarthy" and "Theodore", but such usage is considered incorrect by hackamore reinsmen of the American West.

The bosal acts on the horse's nose and jaw, and is most commonly used to start young horses under saddle in the Vaquero tradition of the "California style" cowboy. The bosal is a very sophisticated and versatile style of hackamore. Bosals come in varying diameters and weights, allowing a more skilled horse to "graduate" into ever lighter equipment. Once a young horse is solidly trained with a bosal, a bit can be added and the horse is gradually shifted from the hackamore to a bit. While designed to be gentle, Bosals are equipment intended for use by experienced trainers, as they can be confusing in the wrong hands.

The bosal acts as a signal device providing a pre-signal to the horse by the lifting of the heel knot off the chin when the rider picks up on a rein. This gives the horse time to be prepared for the impending cue. Hackamores are traditionally used one rein at a time, with fluctuating pressure. Pulling back on both reins with steady pressure teaches a horse to brace and resist, which is the opposite of the hackamore's intention. Hackamores are used in the classic Vaquero tradition to teach young horses softness, and to give readily to pressure while leaving the mouth untouched for the spade bit later on in training. Bosals come in varying diameters and weights, allowing a more skilled horse to "graduate" into ever lighter equipment. Once a young horse is solidly trained with a bosal, a spade bit is added and the horse is gradually shifted from the hackamore to a bit, to create a finished bridle horse. Some horses are never transitioned to a bitted bridle, and it is possible to use the hackamore for the life of the horse.

=== Sidepulls ===
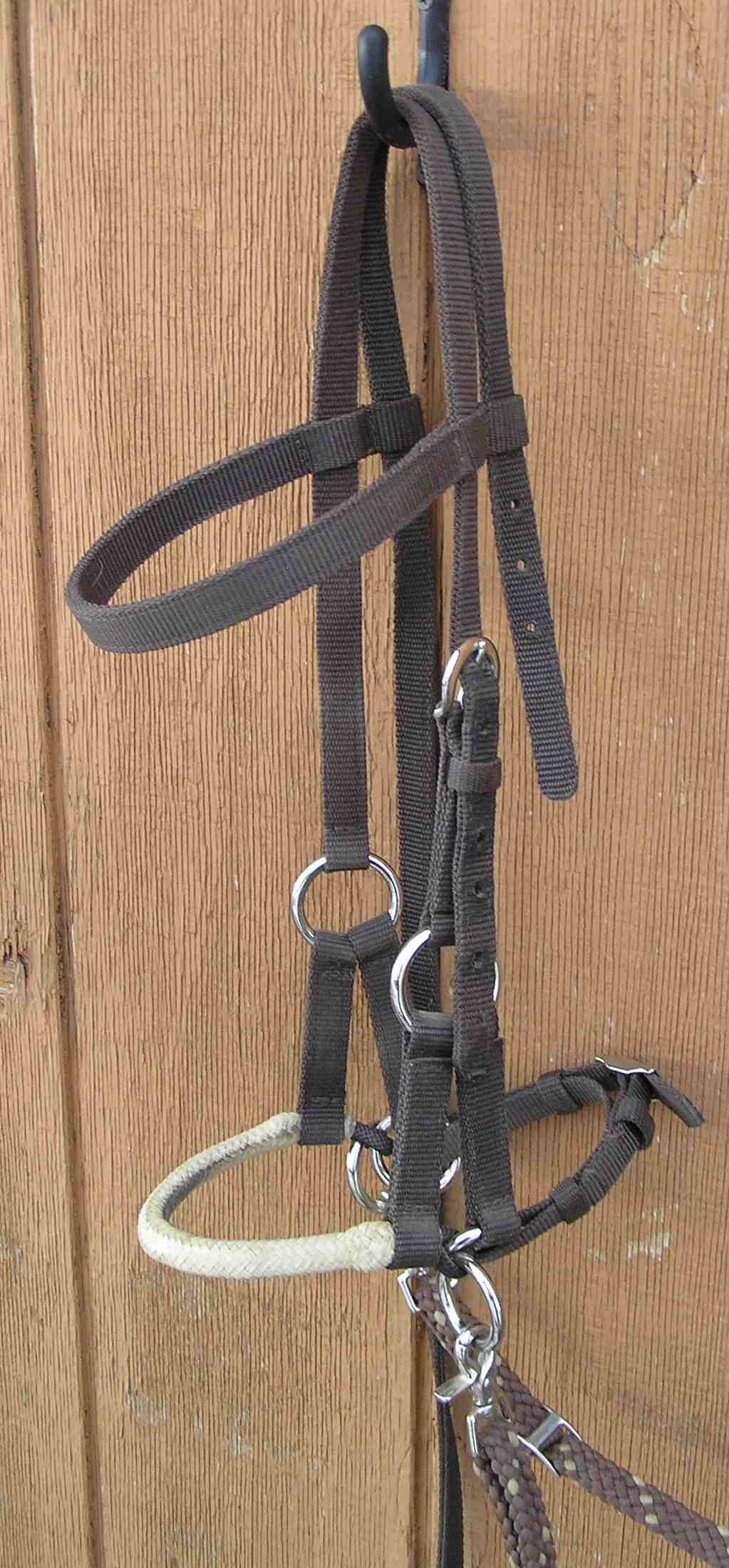
A western-style sidepull

The sidepull is a modern design inspired by the bosal, though it is not a true hackamore. It is a heavy noseband with rings that attach the reins on either side of the head, allowing very direct pressure to be applied from side to side. The noseband is made of leather, rawhide, or rope with a leather or synthetic strap under the jaw, held on by a leather or synthetic headstall. Sidepulls are primarily used to start young horses or on horses that cannot carry a bit.

While severity can be increased by using harder or thinner rope, a sidepull lacks the sophistication of the bosal. The primary advantage of a sidepull over the bosal is that it gives stronger direct lateral commands and is a bit easier for an unsophisticated rider to use. Once a horse understands basic commands, however, the trainer needs to shift to either a bosal or to a snaffle bit to further refine the horse's training. If made of soft materials, a sidepull may also be useful for beginners so that they do not injure their horse's mouth as they learn the rein aids.

English riders sometimes use a jumping cavesson, or jumping hackamore, which is a type of hackamore that consists of a heavy leather nosepiece (usually with a cable or rope inside) with rings on the sides for reins, similar to a sidepull, but more closely fitting and able to transmit more subtle commands. A jumping cavesson is put on a standard English-style headstall and often is indistinguishable at a distance from a standard bridle. It is often used on horses who cannot tolerate a bit or on those who have mouth or tongue injuries.

=== Mechanical hackamore ===
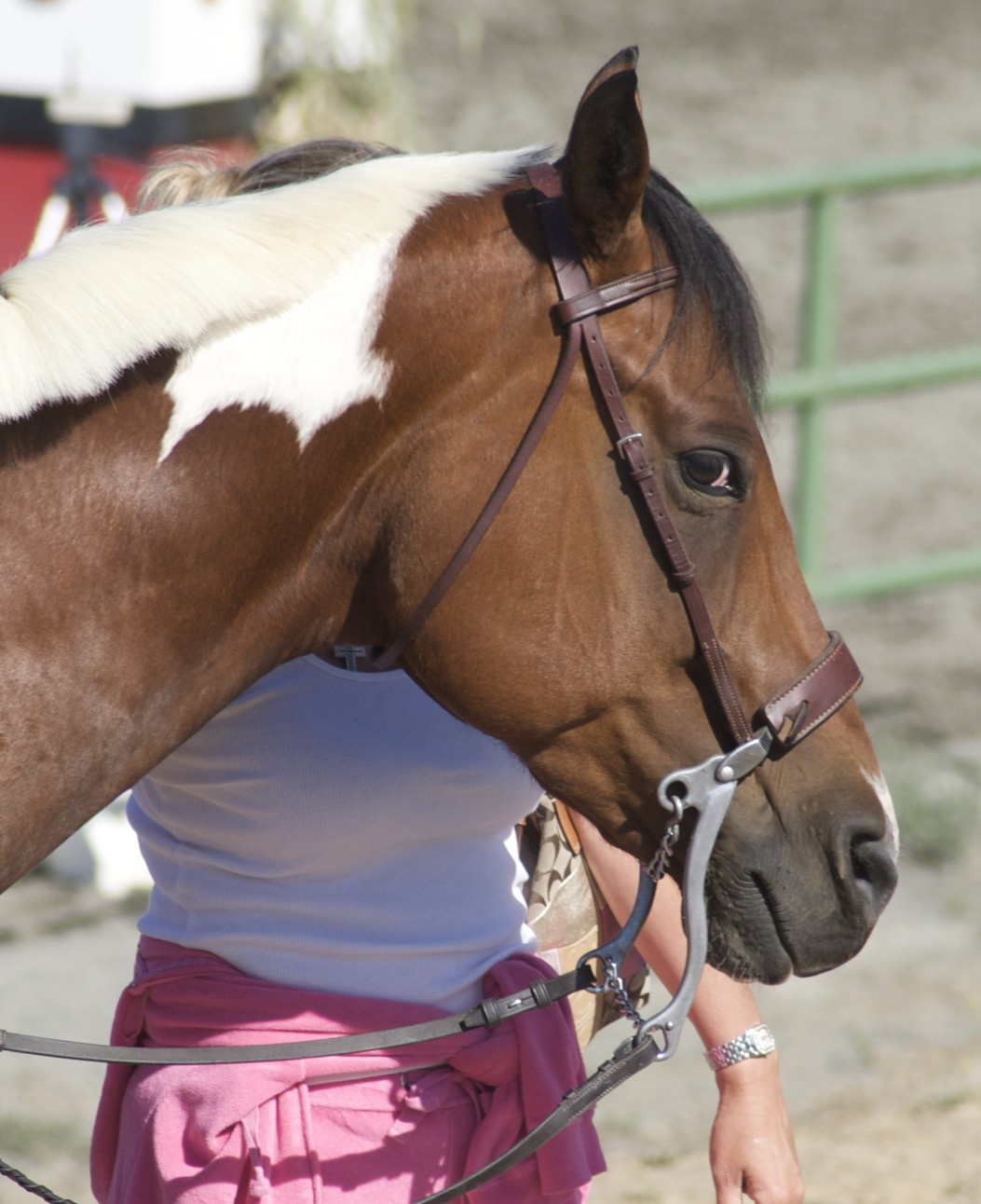
A mechanical "hackamore"

A mechanical hackamore, sometimes called a hackamore bit, English hackamore, or a brockamore, falls into the hackamore category only because it is a device that works on the nose and not in the mouth. The mechanical hackamore uses pressure on the chin and the nose to guide the horse. A mechanical hackamore uses shanks and leverage, thus it is not a true hackamore. Because of its long, metal shanks and a curb chain that runs under the jaw, it works similarly to a curb bit. The ability to apply leverage creates a high risk of abusive use in the hands of a rough rider. Mechanical hackamores lack the sophistication of bits or a bosal, cannot turn a horse easily, and primarily are used for their considerable stopping power. While the bosal hackamore is legal in many types of western competition at horse shows, the mechanical hackamore is not allowed; its use is primarily confined to pleasure riding, trail riding, and types of competition such as rodeos, where bitting rules are fairly lenient.

=== Proper use ===
The proper use of a hackamore can vary depending on the rider's intentions. Riding a horse with a hackamore for pleasure and riding a horse with a hackamore for work will require totally different understandings of how the tack works. When riding with a hackamore for working purposes it is important to make sure both the horse's neck and chin are being engaged with the reins. The way the rider holds his or her hands is also very important when working with a hackamore. The way the hands are held will affect how the reins are pulled which will affect how and where the pressure is being put on the horse. When pulling on the reins to guide the horse one should pull the reins towards his or her hips to get the proper movement from the horse.

=== Other equipment ===
Like the mechanical hackamore, various modern headstall designs known as "bitless bridles" or "cross-under bitless bridles" are also not a true hackamore, even though they lack a bit. These devices use various assortments of straps around the nose and poll to apply pressure by tightening the headstall in particular areas. They are not as subtle as a bosal, but serve many of the same purposes as a sidepull and are generally milder than most mechanical hackamores.

Some people also ride horses with a halter. A closely fitted rope halter with knots on the nose, a bosal-like button at the jaw and two reins attached may act in a manner similar to a sidepull or mild bosal. In contrast, use of an ordinary stable halter as headgear to control a horse is, as a rule, a dangerous practice because the stable halter has no way of increasing leverage to exert control by the rider if a horse panics.

== See also ==
- Bitless bridle
- Bosal
- Bridle
- Horse tack
- Noseband
