= Bosal =

Type of hackamore noseband, sometimes misspelled "bosel."

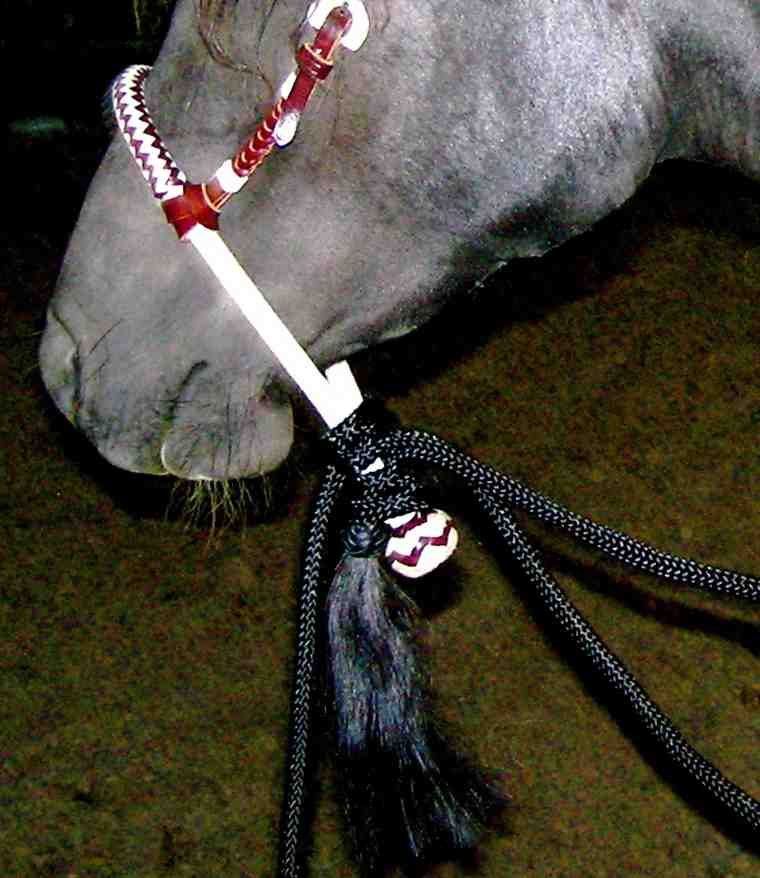
An intermediate-level rawhide bosal on leather headstall, showing attached mecate of synthetic rope and no fiador.

A bosal (/boʊˈsɑːl/, /boʊˈsæl/, or /ˈboʊsəl/ bozal ) is a type of noseband used on the classic hackamore of the vaquero tradition. It is usually made of braided rawhide and is fitted to the horse in a manner that allows it to rest quietly until the rider uses the reins to give a signal. It acts upon the horse's nose and jaw. Though seen in both the "Texas" and the "California" cowboy traditions, it is most closely associated with the "California" style of western riding. Sometimes the term bosal is used to describe the entire classic hackamore or jaquima. Technically, however, the term refers only to the noseband portion of the equipment.

Bosals come in varying diameters and weights, allowing a more skilled horse to "graduate" into ever lighter equipment. Once a young horse is solidly trained with a bosal, a bit is added and the horse is gradually shifted from the hackamore to a bit.

== Etymology and historic use ==
The word bosal is from the Spanish bosal [boˈsal], also spelled bozal [boˈθal], meaning muzzle.

In the Mexican Charro tradition, young horses between four and five years old and typically wild, were started in a bozal. They only introduced the bit much later after the horse was trained in all basic skills. The Charros had five stages for the horse:

- “Caballo Bronco”: the wild horse that has never been ridden.
- “Caballo quebrantado”: the semi-broken horse.
- “Caballo de falsa rienda” or “Caballo de una rienda”: the “false-rein horse” or “one-rein horse”, or the horse being ridden only with the bozal.
- “Caballo de dos riendas”: the “two-rein horse”, or the horse being ridden with both the bozal and the bit.
- “Caballo de rienda limpia” or “rienda pelona” or “caballo hecho”: the “made horse”, the horse ridden only with the bit, the final stage of its education.

== Description ==
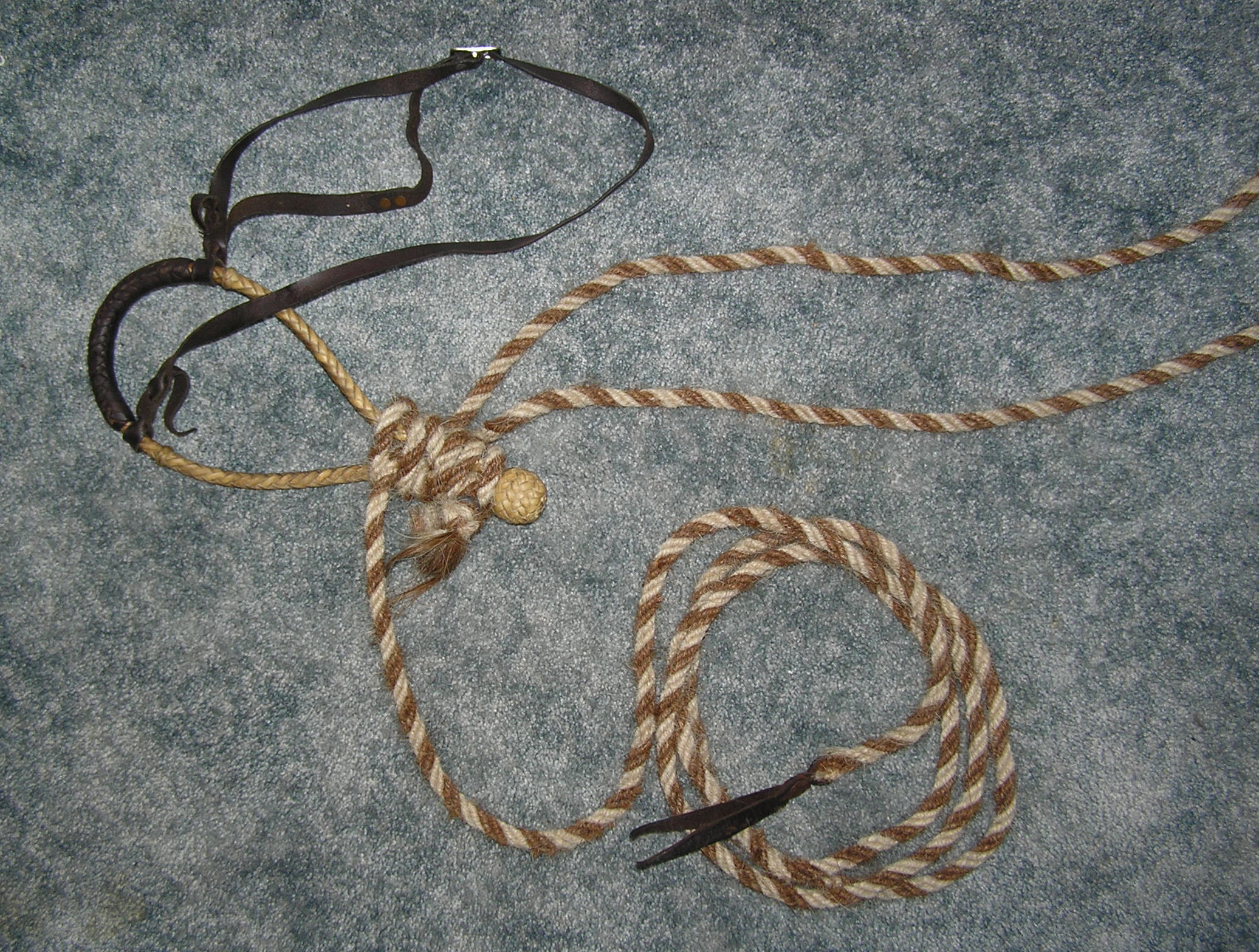
A lightweight bosal made of rawhide, nose button is dark brown leather, horsehair mecate tied just in front of heel knot. Thin leather headstall, no fiador

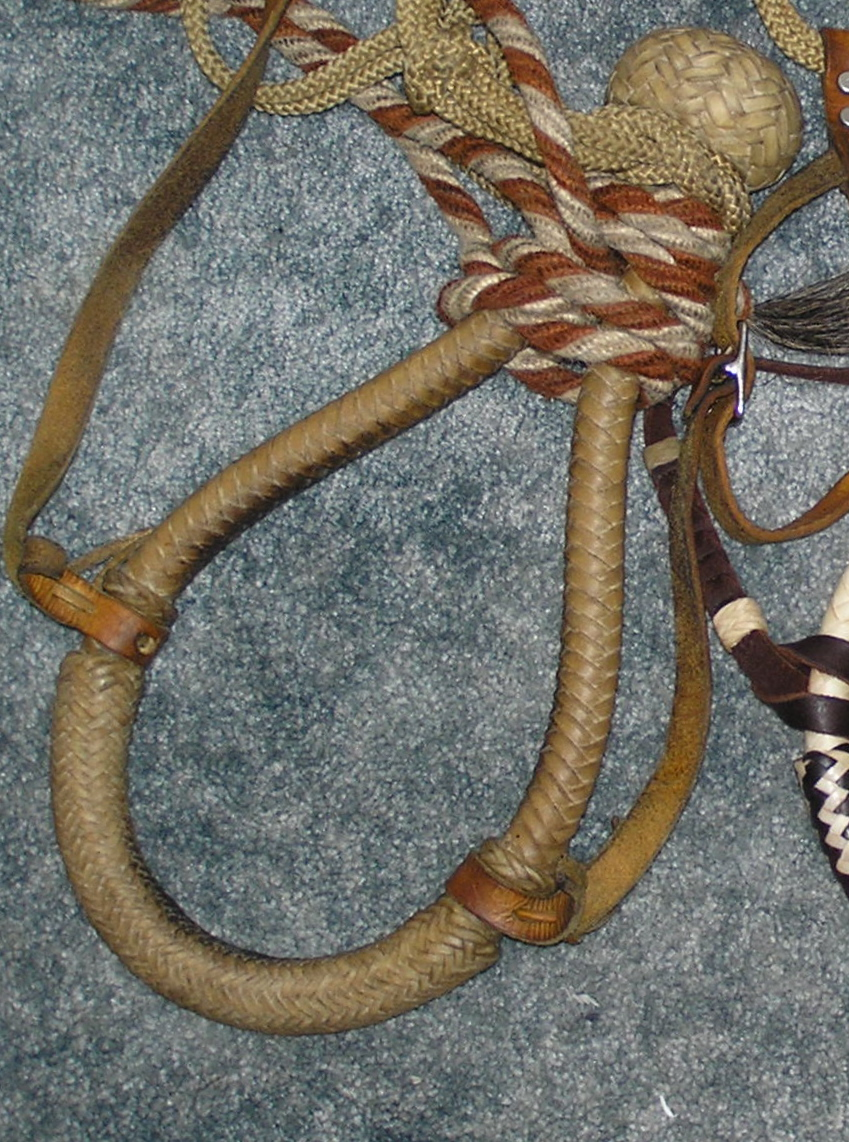
A large diameter bosal with fiador attached below mecate

Over the horse's nose the bosal has a thick, stiff wrapper, called a "nose button." Beneath the horse's chin, the ends of the bosal are joined at a heavy heel knot. The bosal is carried on the animal's head by a headstall, sometimes called a "bosal hanger."

The rein system of the hackamore is called the mecate. The mecate (/məˈkɑːti/ or /məˈkɑːteɪ/) is a long rope, traditionally of horsehair, approximately 20–25 feet long, tied to the bosal in a specialized manner that adjusts the fit of the bosal around the muzzle of the horse, and creates both a looped rein and a long free end that can be used for a number of purposes. When a rider is mounted, the free end is coiled and attached to the saddle or tucked into the rider's belt. When the rider is dismounted, the mecate is not used to tie the horse to a solid object, but rather is used as a lead rope and a form of longe line as needed.

On a finished horse, a bosal with a properly balanced heel knot and mecate generally does not require additional support beyond the headstall. If needed, however, additional support can be provided by one or two accessories. The most common is a throatlatch known as a fiador. If a fiador is used, a browband is added to hold the fiador to the headstall. Less often, the bosal may be further supported by attaching the nose button to the horse's forelock or the crownpiece of the headstall, using a single thin strap of leather called a frentera.

== Uses ==
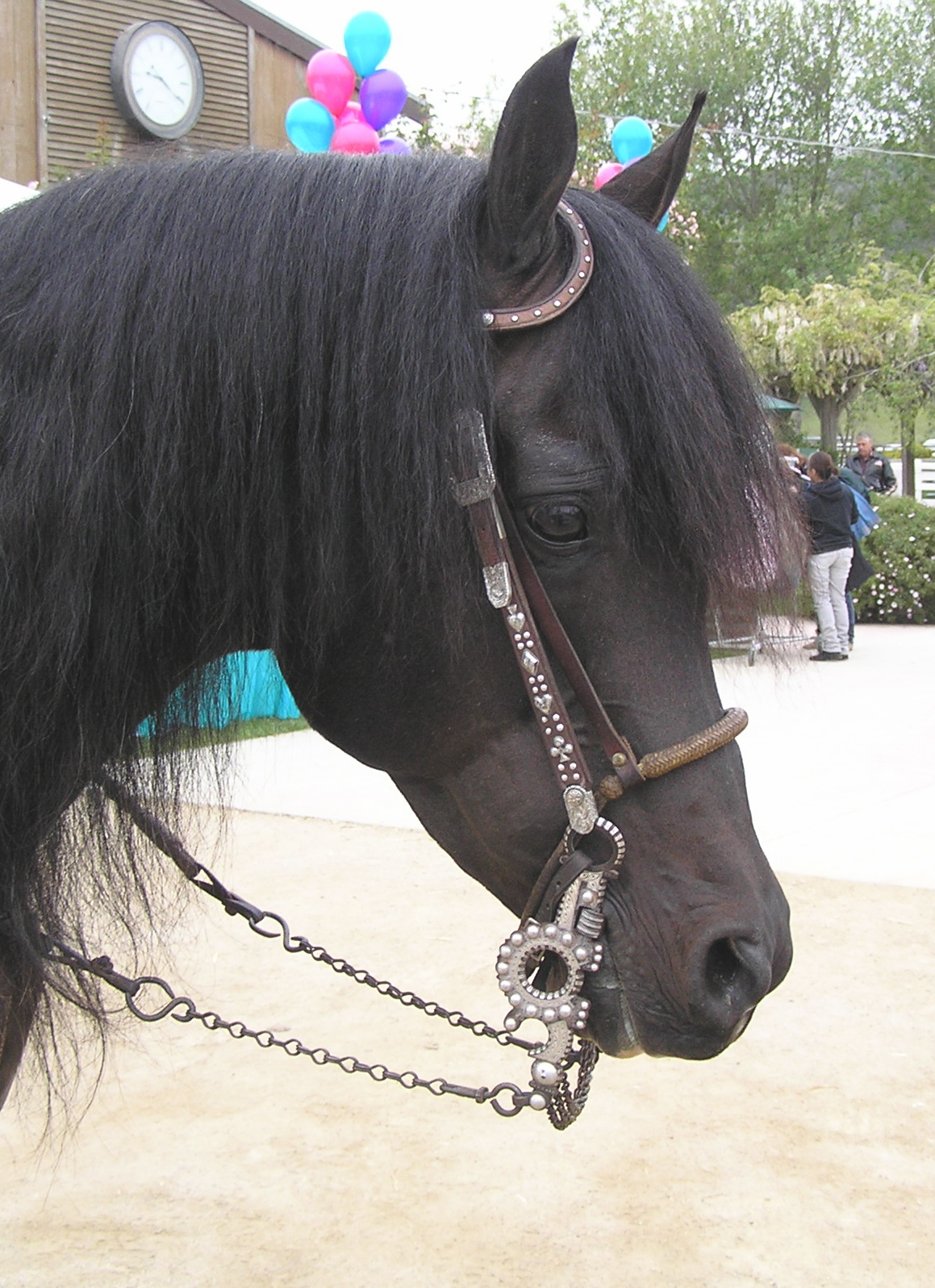
A pencil bosal worn under the bridle on a finished "two rein" horse

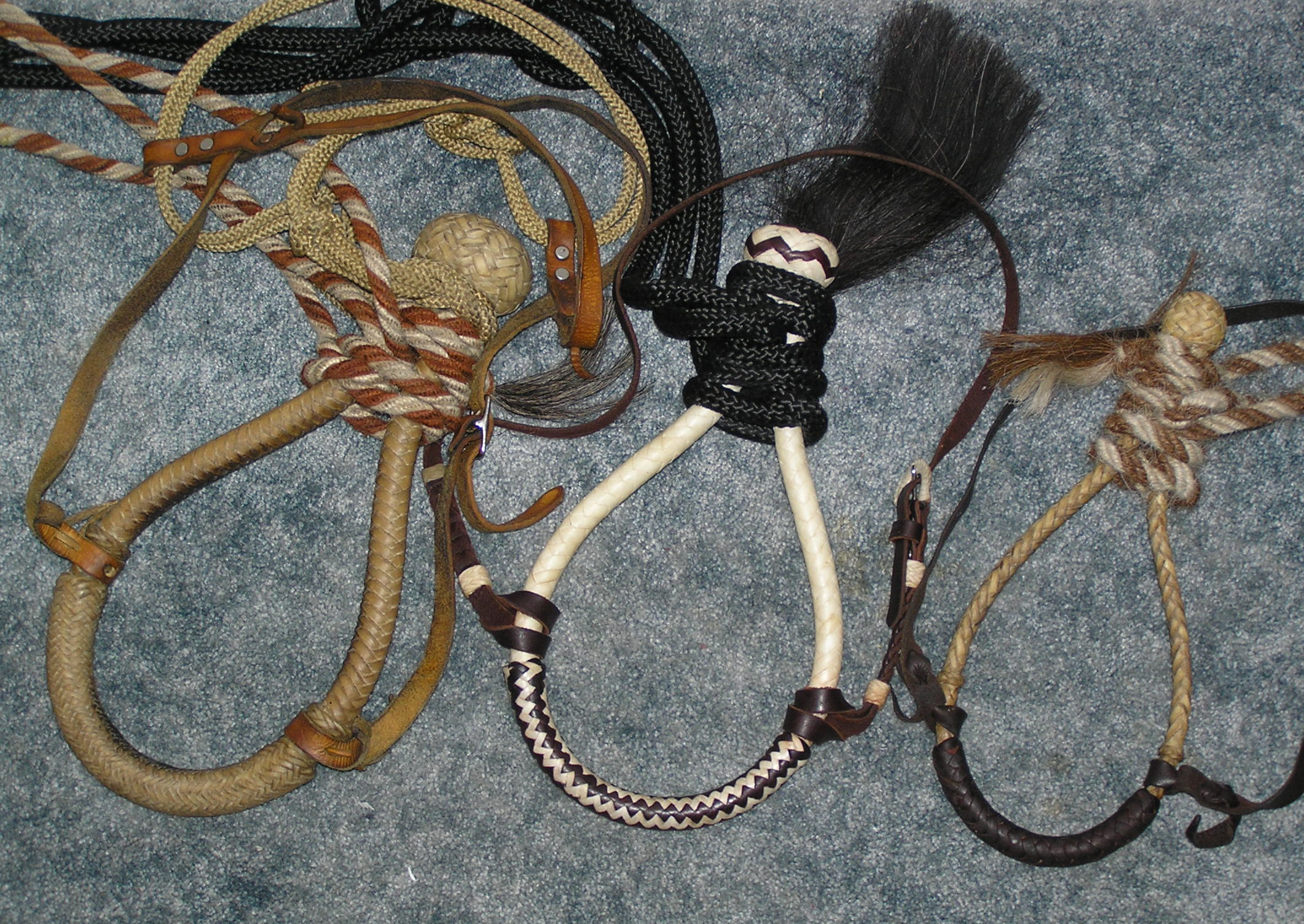
Three different sizes of bosals for horses in various stages of hackamore training, the thickest (left) is for starting unbroke young horses, the middle is a medium-sized design for horses that are steady under saddle but still "green", often also used for show, and the thinnest (right) is for use on a polished hackamore horse as it transitions into a bit, designed to be worn under a bridle.

Those who advocate use of the bosal-style hackamore note that many young horses' mouths are too sensitive for a bit because they are dealing with tooth eruption, replacing primary molars with permanent teeth. While designed for use on young horses, bosals are equipment intended for use by experienced trainers and should not be used by beginners, as they can be harsh in the wrong hands.

The bosal is ridden with two hands, and uses direct pressure, rather than leverage. It is particularly useful for encouraging flexion and softness in the young horse, though it has a design weakness that it is less useful than a snaffle bit for encouraging lateral flexion.

The classic vaquero and modern practitioners of the "California" cowboy tradition started a young horse in a bosal hackamore, then over time moved to ever-thinner and lighter bosals, then added a spade bit, then eventually transitioning to a spade alone, ridden with romal style reins, often retaining a light "bosalito" without a mecate. This process took many years and required an expert trainer. The "Texas" tradition cowboy, and most modern trainers, will often start a young western riding horse in a bosal, but then move to a snaffle bit, then to a simple curb bit, and may never introduce the spade at all. Other trainers start a horse with a snaffle bit, then once lateral flexion is achieved, move to a bosal to encourage flexion, then transition to a curb. However, this sequence is frowned upon by those who use classic vaquero techniques.

The combination of fiador with either a frentera or a standard headstall or hanger with browband stabilizes the bosal by supporting it with multiple attachment points. However, it also limits the action of the bosal, and thus, particularly in the California tradition, is removed once the horse is comfortable under saddle. On a finished horse, a bosal with a properly balanced heel knot and mecate generally does not require these additions. In the Texas tradition, where the bosal is placed low on the horse's face, as well as on very green horses in both the California vaquero and Texas traditions, the fiador is used to stabilize the bosal by attaching it to the headstall along the poll joint behind the ears, running under the jaw, and attaching to the bosal at the heel knot, along with the mecate. In the California vaquero tradition, the fiador is omitted once the horse is able to work without it; in other traditions the fiador is retained.

== See also ==
- Fiador
- Hackamore
- Bridle
