= Horse grooming =

Hygienic and aesthetic care for horses

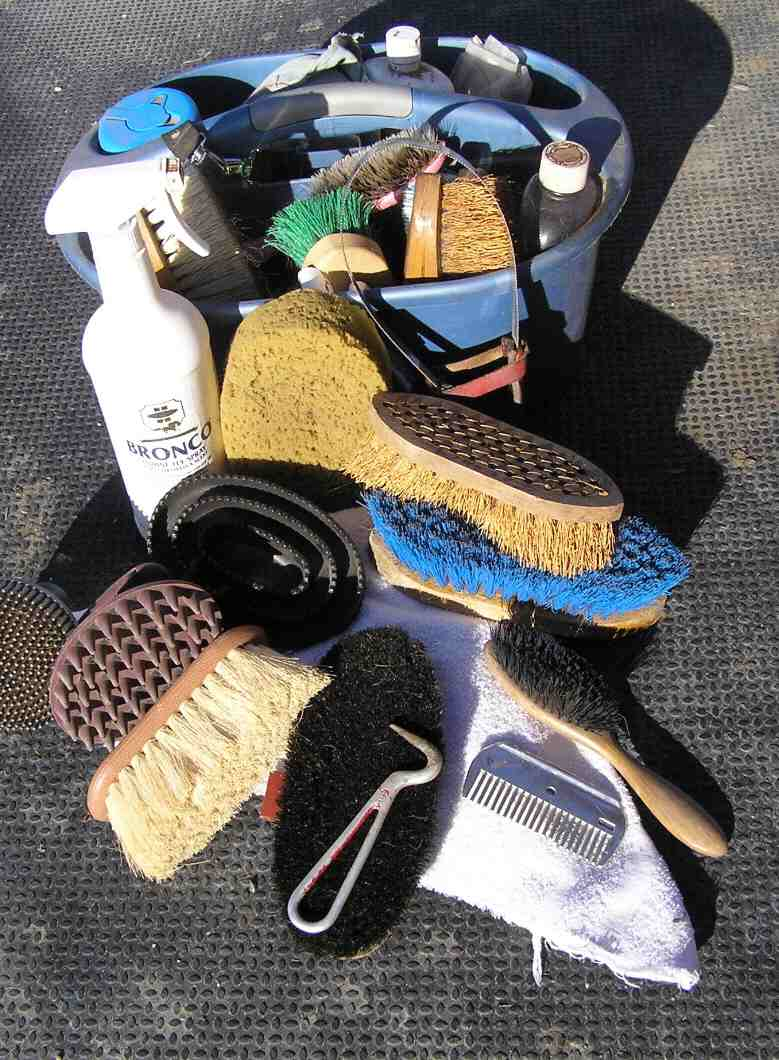
Common tools used for grooming a horse

Horse grooming is hygienic care given to a horse, or a process by which the horse's physical appearance is enhanced for horse shows or other types of competition.

== Reasons for grooming ==
Grooming is an important part of horse care. Grooming a horse daily allows the handler to check on the horse's general health and well-being. At a minimum, horses are generally groomed before being worked, and are usually groomed and cleaned up after a workout as well. Horse showmanship is a horse show class that considers quality of grooming for as much as 40% of the total score.

The main reasons for daily grooming include:

- Improved health of the skin and coat
- Decreases the chance of various health problems such as thrush, scratches, and other skin problems
- Cleans the horse, so chafing does not occur under areas of tack
- Gives the groom a chance to check the horse's health, such as looking for cuts, heat, swelling, lameness, a change in temperament (such as depression) which could indicate the horse is sick, and look to see if the horse has loose or missing horseshoes
- Helps to form a relationship between horse and handler, which can carry over to other handling duties and riding

== Tools used for grooming ==
There are several tools that are commonly used when grooming a horse. Proper use and technique helps to ensure the horse remains comfortable during the grooming process, and allows for greater ease in cleaning the animal.

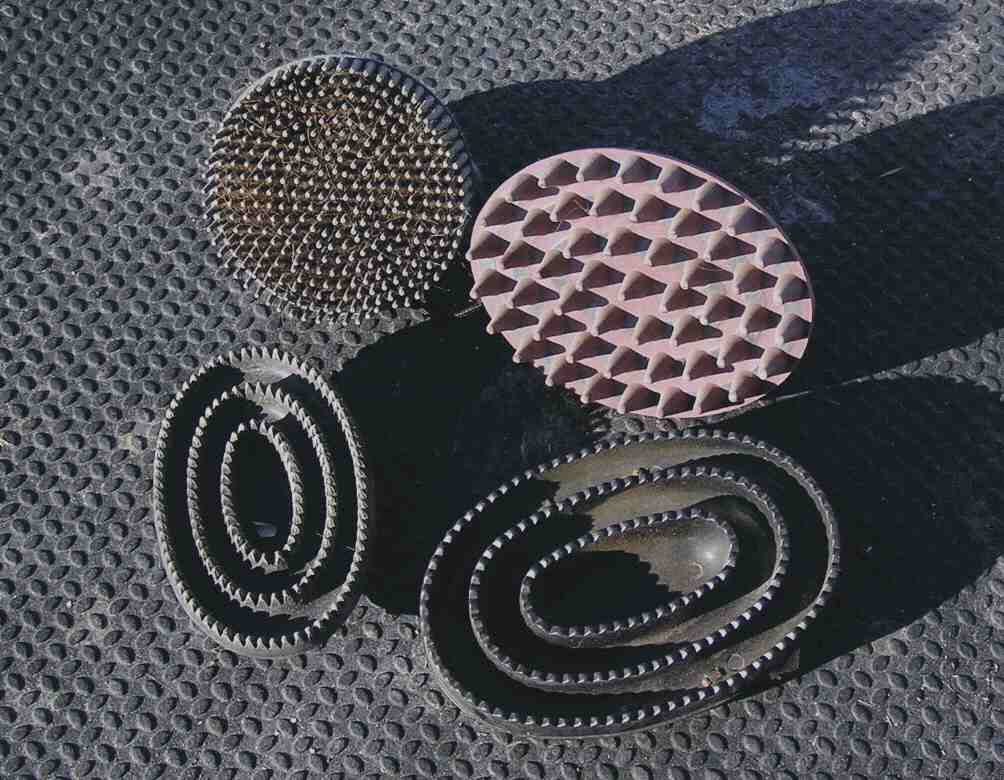
Various types of currycombs, made of both hard and soft materials

- Currycomb: A tool made of rubber or plastic with short "teeth" on one side that slides onto the hand of the groom. It is usually the first tool used in daily grooming. The horse is rubbed or "curried" to help loosen dirt, hair, and other detritus, plus stimulate the skin to produce natural oils. The currycomb is usually used in a circular motion to work loose embedded material. Alternatively, you can use multiple short but swift strokes, following the direction of hair growth. Currycombs are generally too harsh to be used on the legs or head, though varieties made of softer rubber are available.
- Metal currycomb or Fitch currycomb: A currycomb made of several rows of short metal teeth, with a handle. While useful for caked-on mud, particularly on horses with a heavy winter coat, they are primarily designed for use on show cattle, and are frequently used to clean horse grooming brushes by moving the brush across the metal currycomb teeth every few strokes. The metal currycomb is not designed for use directly on the summer coat of a horse as the metal teeth can damage the skin and hair. It should not be confused with the shedding blade.
- Bristle brush: A stiff bristle brush used to remove the dirt, hair and other material stirred up by the curry. Brushes are used in the direction of the horse's hair coat growth, usually in short strokes from front to back except at the flanks where the hair grows in a different pattern.
- Body brush or Soft brush: A soft-bristled brush that removes finer particles and dust, adds a shine to the coat, and is soothing to the horse. A body brush, particularly a smaller design called a Face brush, can be used on the head, while being careful to avoid the horse's eyes. Some natural body brushes are made of horsehair, goat hair, or boar bristles, like human hairbrushes; others are made of soft, synthetic fibers. The body brush is generally the last brush used on the horse.
- Dandy brush: The best quality dandy brushes are made of stiff natural bristles such as rice stems, though they wear out quickly. Plastic-bristled dandy brushes are more common. Dandy brushes can usually be used on the legs; many horses object to a stiff brush being used on the head. Some dandy brushes double as water brushes when moistened with water and used to wet down the hair coat, mane, or tail. This method creates quarter marks for show.
- Grooming rag or towel, also called a Stable rubber: A linen or terrycloth towel or similar type of cloth or sheepskin mitt that can be used to give a final polish to a horse's coat. It is also used after riding to help remove sweat.
- Mane-comb: A comb used for brushing the horse's mane.
- Hoof pick: A hooked implement used to remove foreign objects from a hoof. Some designs include a small, very stiff brush for removing additional mud or dirt. All four feet of the horse need to be cleaned out before and after riding. (See Cleaning the feet below).
- Shedding blade: In special weather conditions, a metal shedding blade with short, dull teeth is used to remove loose winter hair. A shedding blade is also useful for removing caked-on mud. However, grooming tools with metal teeth can split and dull the horse's hair coat and may irritate the skin, so must be used with appropriate care. Likewise, metal grooming tools used on sheep and show cattle may also be too harsh to use on a horse.
- Sweat scraper: Several styles of sweat scrapers exist to remove sweat after exertion or water after bathing. One is a simple curved and fluted metal or plastic wand, about 18 inches (46 cm) long. Another design is an arc of plastic or rubber attached to a handle, sometimes with two curved blades (one rubber, one metal or plastic) attached back to back. A third design is a flexible curved blade with teeth on one side to use as a shedding blade, and is smooth on the other for use as a sweat scraper.
- Fly spray: In the summer, fly spray is often applied to the horse after grooming. Care must be taken to avoid the eyes and mucous membranes.
- Bot knife: used to remove botfly eggs from the horse, which are usually laid on the legs or shoulder. Bot eggs are yellow and roughly the size of a grain of sand. They are clearly visible on dark hair and harder to spot on white hair. A bot knife generally has a blunt end and curved blade and is used to "shave" off the eggs. A bot brick is a small pumice stone or block of dense Styrofoam that will pick up eggs when rubbed on the hair.
- Scissors: Used to trim long hairs growing under the jaw and the fetlocks, as well as trimming the bridle path or banging the tail.
- Clippers: In order to remove a horse's winter coat to allow him to work more comfortably and dry faster in the colder months, larger electric clippers are used. Small clippers are also useful for trimming ears, jawlines and legs. Hand-operated clippers are still available but not often used due to concerns of efficiency. (See Clipping below).
- Sponges: Small sponges can be used to clean the eyes, nose, lips and, using a separate sponge dedicated to the task, beneath the dock and around the genitals. Larger sponges can be used to wet down and clean the body and legs.

== The hoof ==
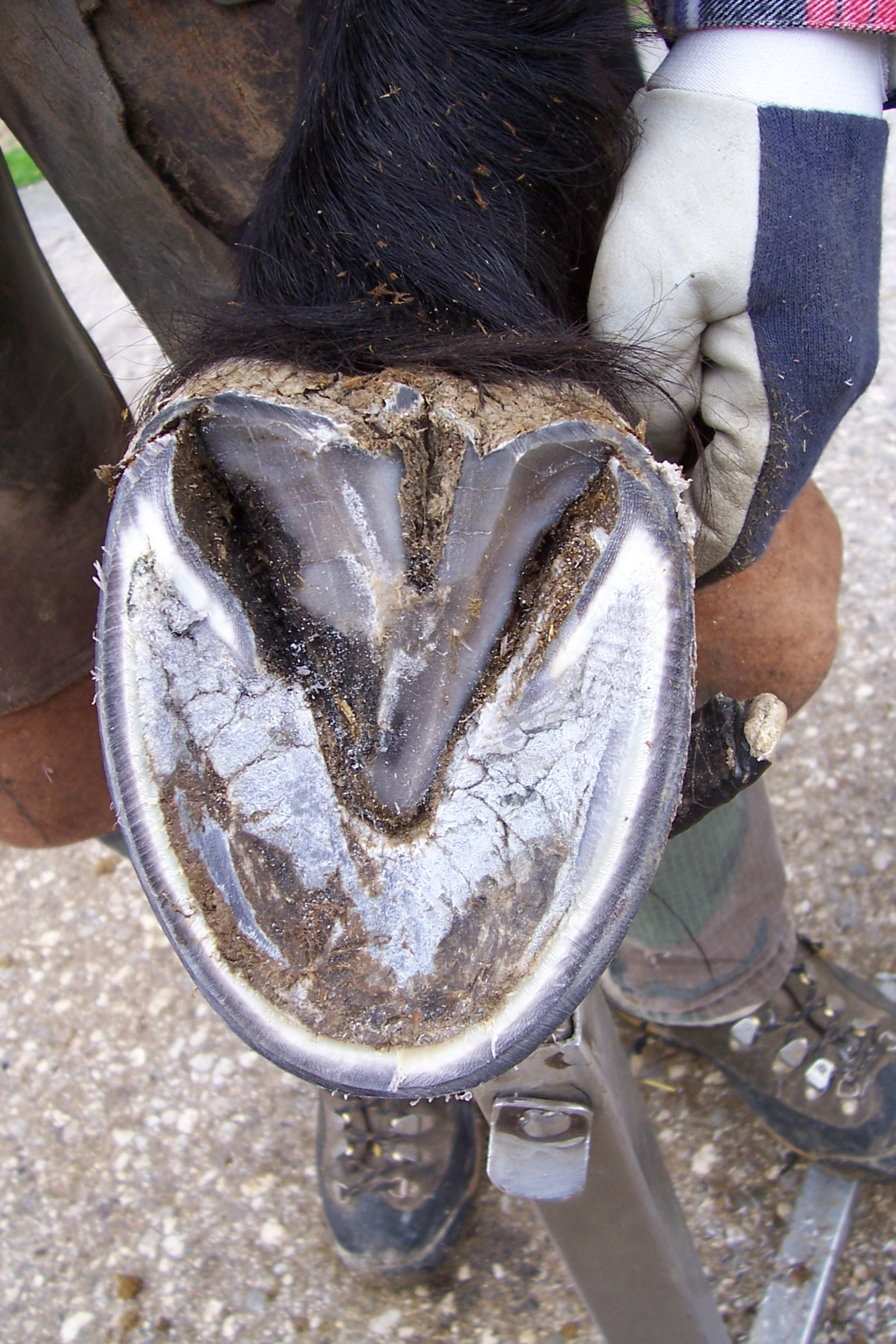
The clean, picked hoof allows for better inspection for injury.

Hoof care is especially important when caring for the horse. Although many horses are quite healthy without daily brushing, lack of hoof care can result in various problems, which if unattended, can result in short or long-term soundness issues for the horse. Hooves need to be trimmed after four to ten weeks; otherwise, they will grow too long and cause discomfort.

=== Cleaning the feet ===
The most basic form of hoof care is cleaning, or "picking out the feet". A hoof pick is used to remove mud, manure and stones from the sole of the hoof. Removal of mud and manure helps to prevent thrush, a common hoof ailment which may cause lameness in very severe cases. The removal of stones also helps to prevent stone bruises. In the winter hoof picking removes packed snow from the horse's hooves, which can cause uncomfortable "snowballs". Additionally, when the hoof is cleaned, it can be visually inspected for puncture wounds, known as nail prick (which has the potential to be very serious if left untreated).

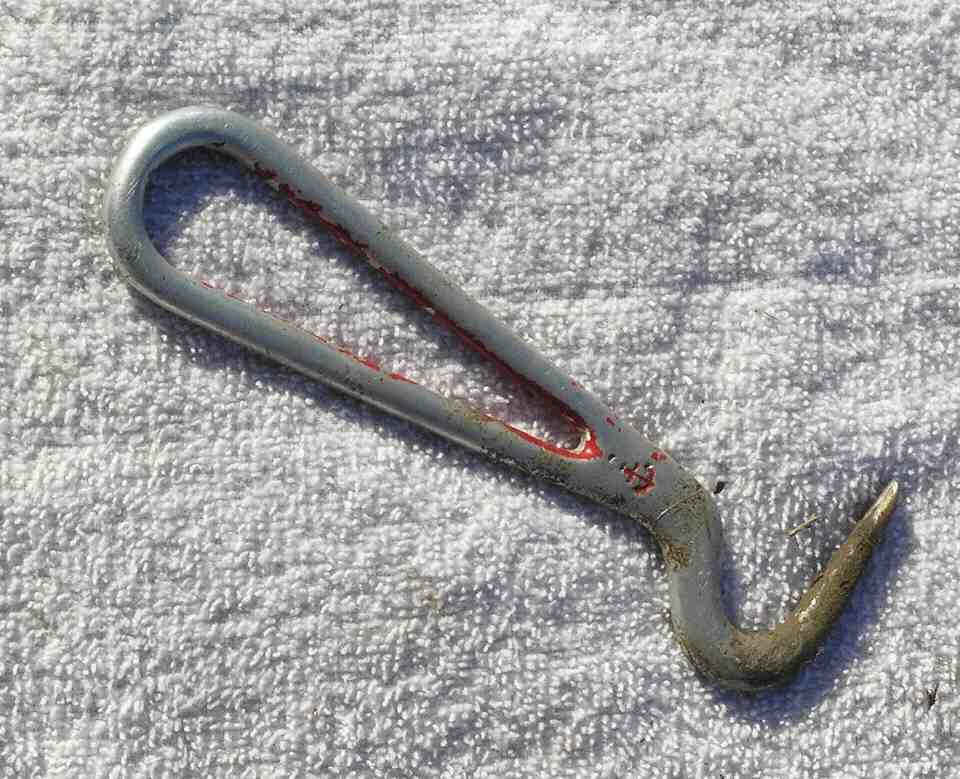
A well-worn but perfectly usable hoof pick

All crevices of the hoof are cleaned, particularly the sulci between the frog and the bars, as those areas are most likely to trap stones or other debris and also are the most common area to develop thrush. It is best to work the hoof pick from heel to toe to avoid accidentally jabbing the horse's leg, the frog of the hoof or the person using the pick. When picking the feet, the groom stands at the horse's side, facing the tail, then slides his or her hand down the horse's leg. If the horse has not been trained to pick up its foot when a person runs their hand to the fetlock and lifts lightly, most horses will pick up their feet if the tendons behind their cannon bone are squeezed. Some horses, particularly draft breeds, may be trained to pick up their feet to pressure on their fetlock.

Most horse-management guidelines recommend picking the feet daily, and in many cases the feet are picked twice, both before and after a ride.

=== Dressings and polish ===
Hoof dressing is a liquid used on the hooves to improve their moisture content, which in turn helps prevent cracks, lost shoes, tender feet and other common problems. Polish for hooves is used for show purposes and is based on formulas similar to either wax-based shoe polish or the enamel in human nail polish.

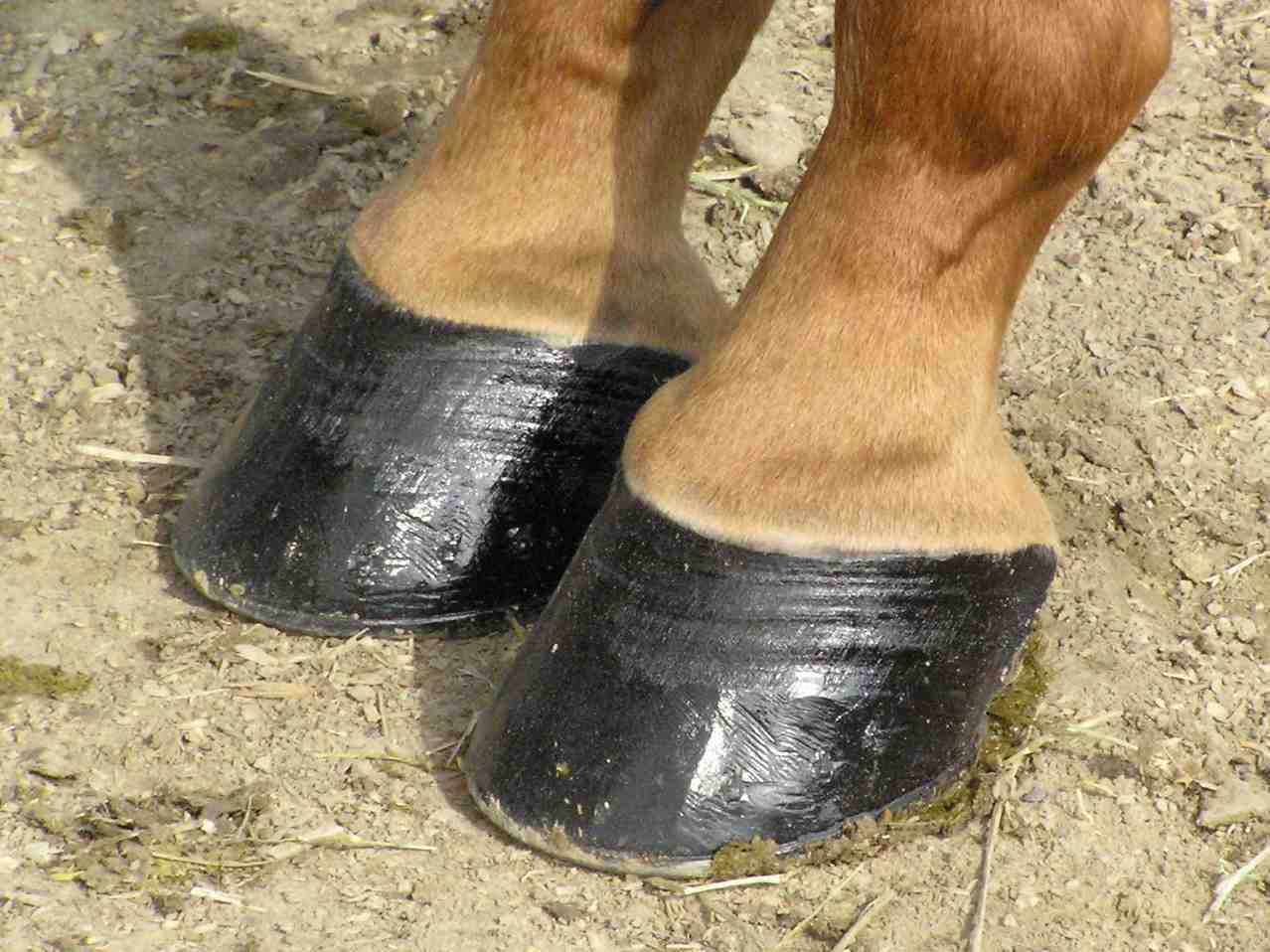
Front hooves sporting black hoof polish

In many disciplines the hooves are painted with either clear or black hoof polish as a finishing touch. Clear polish is generally used in dressage, show hunters, jumpers and eventing, as well as most breed shows, except on some stock horse breeds. Black polish is seen in the western disciplines, especially western pleasure, but some breeds, notably the Appaloosa, ban any polish that alters the natural hoof color. Gaited breeds have varying rules, some allowing black polish; others limit its use. Whether clear or colored, polish is applied purely for aesthetic reasons as a finishing touch.

== Bathing ==
Horses do not require bathing and many horses live their entire lives without a bath. However, horses are often hosed off with water after a heavy workout as part of the cooling down process, and are often given baths prior to a horse show to remove every possible speck of dirt. Horses can be bathed by being wet down with a garden hose or by being sponged off with water from a bucket. They must be trained to accept bathing, as a hose and running water are unfamiliar objects and initially may frighten a horse. A hose is usually used for bathing, starting near the legs, with the hose pointed downwards so that water does not hit the horse in the face. Either horse or human shampoo may be safely used on a horse, if thoroughly rinsed out, and cream rinses or hair conditioners similar to those used by humans are often used on show horses. Too-frequent shampooing can strip the hair coat of natural oils and cause it to dry out. Though horses in heavy work, such as racehorses, may be rinsed off after their daily workout, it is generally not advisable to shampoo a horse more than once a week, even in the show season. A well-groomed, clean horse can be kept clean by wearing a horse blanket or horse sheet.

== Clipping ==
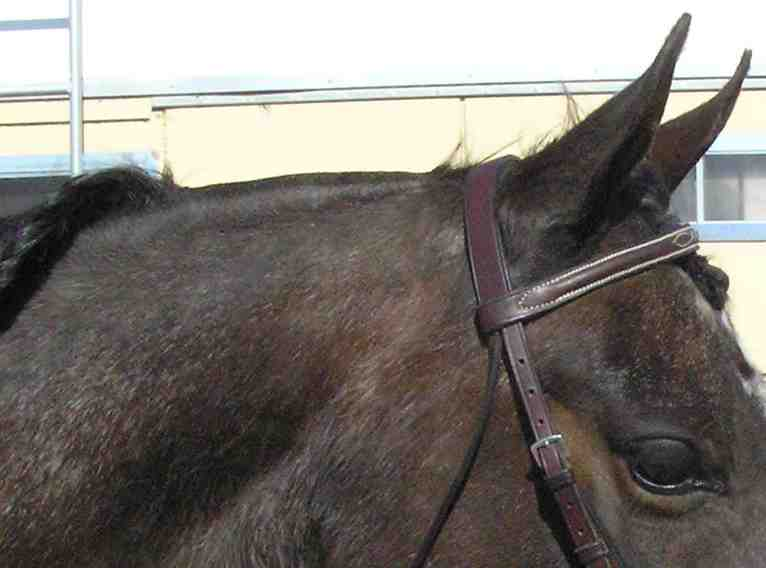
A newly clipped bridle path. Note that ears of horse are also trimmed.

Many horses have hair trimmed or removed, especially for show. Different disciplines have very different standards. The standards for breed competitions are also highly variable, and deviation from the acceptable grooming method may not be permitted at breed shows. It is often best to check the rules, and to ask a horseman experienced in your discipline or breed of choice, before performing any type of trimming or clipping to a show horse. Severely "incorrect" clipping is often considered a great faux pas in the horse world.

=== Trimming ===
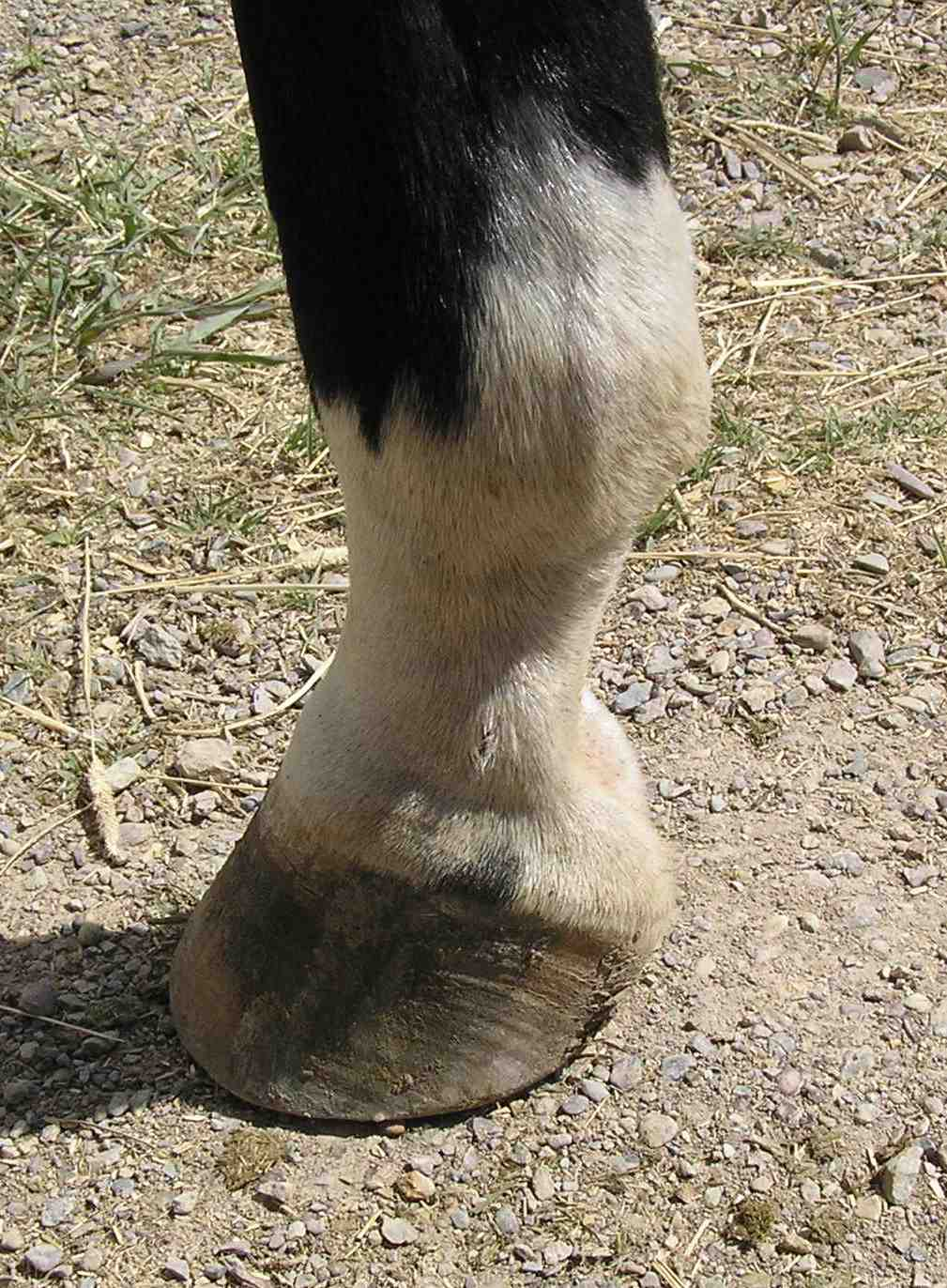
Trimmed lower hind leg, with clipped cannon, fetlock, pastern, and coronary band

Clipping style is quite variable by breed, region and discipline. While some clipping has its origins in practical purposes, much of the clipping today is very much based on the showing style for which a particular horse is used. The most common areas clipped include:

- Bridle path: a section of mane just behind the ears that is frequently clipped or shaved off. For practical purposes, this allows the bridle to lie comfortably across the poll, making it slightly easier to bridle the horse, as the mane and forelock are separated and easier to keep out of the way. The length of the bridle path varies by breed and region of the world: for example, the American Saddlebred and the Arabian are commonly shown in the United States with bridle paths that are several inches long, while other breeds (such as the Friesian horse) are not permitted to have any bridle path. In the UK and continental Europe, bridle paths are generally rather short, if clipped at all, though there is variation depending on breed.
- Face: There is little real need to clip the face; it is done primarily for aesthetic reasons. The most practical location to clip is under the jaw, to create a more refined appearance and remove excess hair that may interfere with the cavesson and throatlatch of the bridle. The whiskers of the muzzle are commonly shaved in the United States, though not as often in Europe. Some also clip the feelers above and below the eyes. Clipping the whiskers of the muzzle or eyes is a topic of minor controversy, as they are thought to help prevent injury because the horse can use them to feel when it is approaching an object.
- Ears: The hair on the pinnae (ears) of the horse may be clipped, sometimes both inside and out. The practice of clipping the inside of the ears is controversial, as the hairs inside the ear protect the inner ear from dirt and insects. When the ears are trimmed on the inside, a fly mask with ear protection is often put on the horse to replace its natural protection.
- Legs: The fetlocks can collect undesired amounts of mud, dirt, and burrs and may be trimmed for practical reasons. The back of the lower cannon is sometimes clipped to remove long hairs. For a truly polished look, the coronary band is clipped to shorten the small straggling hairs that grow along the edges of the hoof. Leg clipping is done for many light riding horses. However, there are several breeds, particularly draft horse breeds, that consider lower leg feathering to be a breed trait and do not permit the clipping of the fetlocks or "feather" on the lower legs. Daily inspection of feathered legs and feet is important to make sure there are no injuries.

=== Body clipping ===
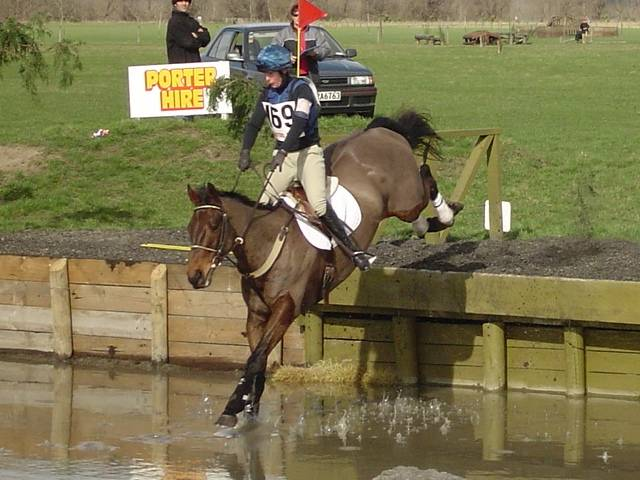
Hunter clip, with the legs and head unclipped

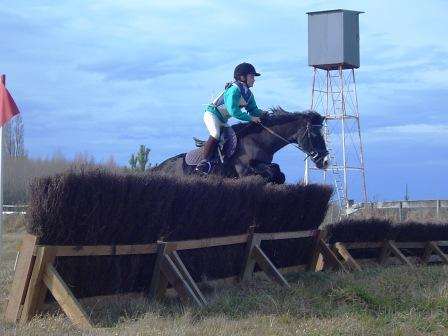
High trace clip: clipping the bottom of the neck, the shoulder, and hindquarters. Click to enlarge.

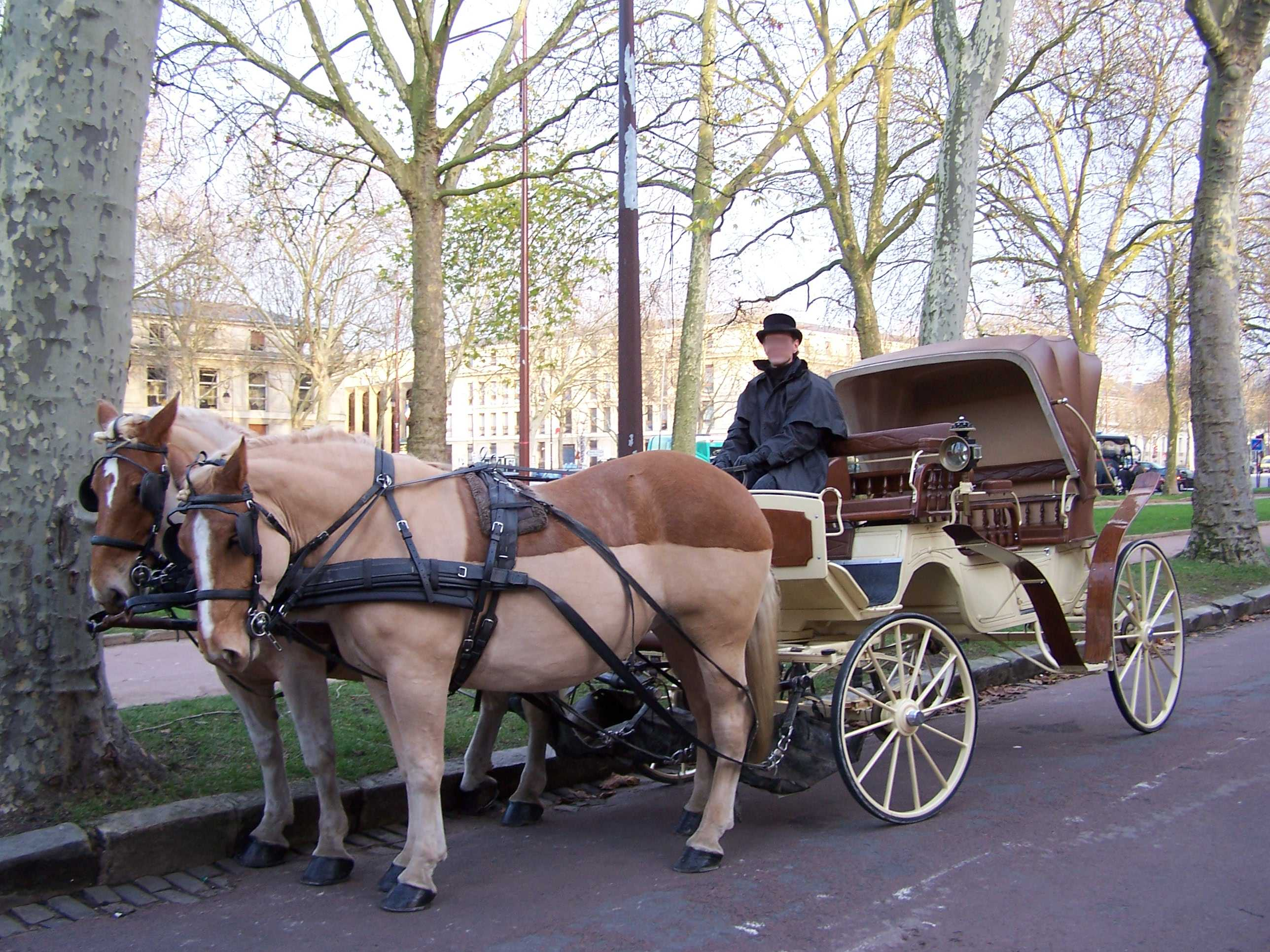
Blanket clip

In addition to basic trimming, many horses are "body clipped" in the winter months, to remove their winter coat. This can serve a practical purpose, as it keeps the horse more comfortable during work and helps cool down faster. It can also serve an aesthetic purpose, as most horsemen agree a horse looks finer and more show-worthy with a shorter coat. Additionally, grooming is usually easier and less time-consuming when the hair is shortened.

Before one makes the decision to body clip a horse, one must be sure to consider the fact that they are removing the horse's natural defenses against the cold. They must therefore be able to provide blanketing, and in some cases, stabling, for the horse if the temperature drops, or if there is a cold rain or snow. This will increase the amount of work needed to keep the horse, as the groom must change the blankets as needed, but it is essential to keep the horse comfortable and healthy.

Types of body clips include:

- Body clip or Full body clip: The horse's entire body is clipped, including the head and legs. This is the most common body clip in the US, used in many disciplines. It provides the most "natural" clip, resembling a horse's normal summer coat, plus it is a relatively straightforward clip for a groom to complete. However, it provides the least amount of natural protection for the horse.
- Hunter clip: The entire horse is clipped, except for the legs and a patch of hair under the saddle. This clip traces back to the hunt field, and is still used there today, as it provides extra protection to the back of the horse (essential during several hours of hunting) as well as to the lower legs (which may be cut by brambles), but still allows the horse to stay cool while galloping.
- Blanket clip: Long hair is left in a blanket-shaped area on the horse. The shoulders and neck are clipped, and the legs are left unclipped.
- Trace clip: This varies, but generally the horse is clipped from under its throat, down along the jugular groove, and then clipped halfway up the shoulder and belly. Variations include clipping higher along the neck, shoulder, and belly, and clipping a strip off the side of the hindquarter, to the buttock. Additionally, many clip a strip halfway up the cheek to the muzzle. The back and legs are left unclipped. The clip is named after the traces of the carriage, as it follows a similar pattern. The amount of hair removed is based on the amount it sweats during work and the areas where it sweats the most. It is most commonly used by eventers.
- Chaser clip: Hair is removed from a line below the poll to the stifle and the legs are left on. This is a popular clip for steeplechasers, as it keeps the horse's back warm but also allows for hard work.
- Strip clip or Belly clip: Hair is clipped along the jugular groove, chest and under the barrel. This is a minimal clip, and many horses with this clip do not need extra care beyond regular blanketing.

== The mane ==
The modern horse usually has its mane groomed to fit a particular breed, style, or practical purpose. For informal pleasure riding, the mane is simply detangled with a brush or wide-toothed comb and any foreign material removed.

The mane may be kept in a long, relatively natural state, which is required for show by some breeds, particularly those used in Saddle seat style English riding competition. A long mane may be placed into five to seven long, relatively thick braids between shows to keep it in good condition, to help it grow, and to minimize debris and dirt from entering. Breeds mandated to show with a long mane keep a long mane in almost all disciplines, even those where show etiquette normally requires thinning or pulling.

In some breeds or disciplines, particularly many Western and hunt seat competitions, the mane is thinned and shortened for competition purposes. The most common method of shortening and thinning the mane is by pulling it. Originally, a thinned mane was considered easier to keep free of dirt, burrs, and out of the way of the rider, and thus worth the time and upkeep of regular thinning. Today, its purpose is primarily for tradition and to make it lie flat and be easier to braid or band.

Horses shown in hunter, jumper, dressage, eventing and related hunt seat and show hack disciplines usually have their manes not only shortened and thinned but placed into many individual braids for show. Heavier breeds of horse, particularly draft horses, may have their manes in a French braid instead of being pulled, thinned and placed in individual braids. Breeds required to show with long manes may also French braid the mane if an animal is cross-entered in both a breed and a hunter/jumper discipline.

The mane may also be roached or hogged, meaning that it is completely shaved off. This is most commonly seen in polo ponies, Australian Stock Horses and roping horses to keep the mane out of the rider's way and to prevent the mallet or rope from becoming entangled.

== The tail ==
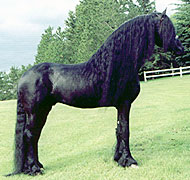
A Friesian horse with a "natural" mane and tail

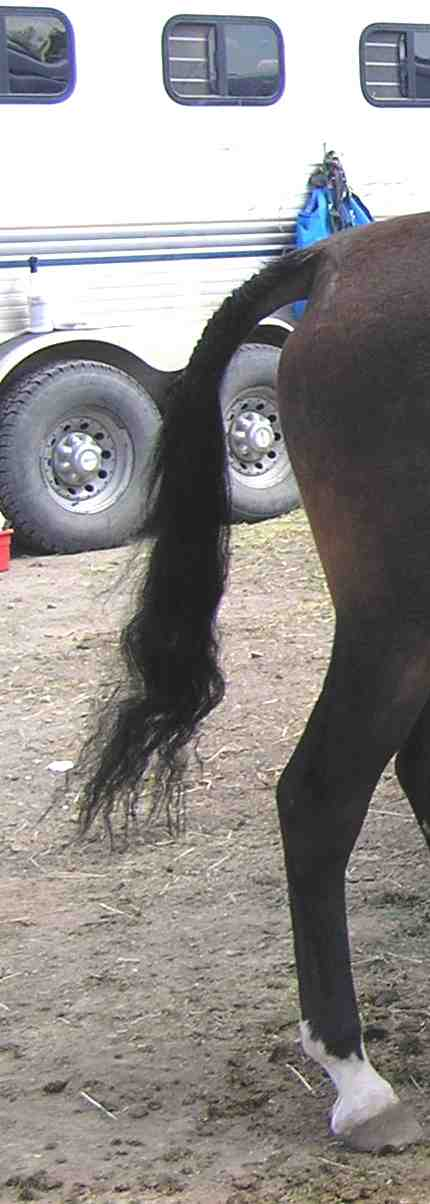
Tail braided for a hunter class

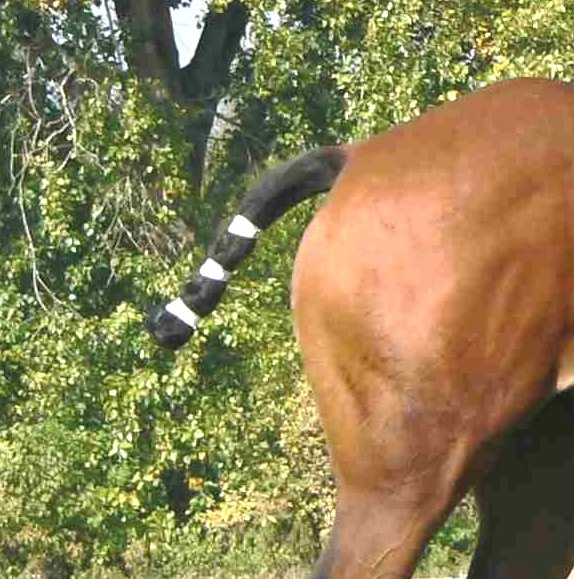
Clipped, braided and wrapped tail on a polo pony, a safety measure

Basic tail grooming begins with simply brushing out foreign material, snarls, and tangles, sometimes with the aid of a detangling product. Horses used in exhibition or competition may have far more extensive grooming. However, the tail's main purpose is fly protection, and certain types of show grooming can inhibit the use of this natural defense.

In show grooming, the dock of the tail (the flesh-covered part of the tail where the hair is rooted) and the "skirt" (the hair below the tip of the dock) may be styled in a wide variety of ways: The tail may be kept natural and encouraged to grow as long as possible, and sometimes even has additional hair artificially attached. Other times, it may be clipped, thinned, or even cut very short. A few breeds are shown with docked tails.

A "natural" tail is neither clipped nor braided when the horse is presented in the ring. The tail may be encouraged to grow as long as possible, often by keeping the skirt of the tail in a long braid when not in competition, usually also folded up and covered by a wrap to keep it clean. The shorter hairs of the dock are allowed to hang loose so that the horse can still swat flies. "Natural" tails can also be thinned and shaped by pulling hairs at the sides of the dock or by pulling the longest hairs in the skirt of the tail, to make the tail shorter and less full, though still retaining a natural shape.

Tail hairs are also cut. "Clipping" the tail usually refers to trimming the sides of the dock, to a point about halfway down the dock. "Banging" the tail involves cutting the bottom of the tail straight at the bottom. In modern competition, this is usually done well below the hocks. Tail extensions, also known as "false tails," or "tail wigs," are false hairpieces which are braided or tied into the tail to make it longer or fuller.

Braiding the dock of the tail in a French braid with the skirt left loose is commonly seen in hunter competition and hunt seat equitation. In polo, draft horse showing and on Lipizzan horses that perform the capriole, the entire tail, dock, and skirt are generally braided and the braid is folded or rolled into a knot, with or without added ribbons and other decorative elements. In inclement weather, many other show disciplines will allow competitors to put up the skirt of the tail into a similar type of stylized knot known as a mud tail.

In the draft horse and some harness breeds, the tail is cut very short to keep it from being tangled in a harness. The term "docked" or "docking" may simply mean cutting the hair of the tail skirt very short, just past the end of the natural dock of the tail. However, it can also refer to partial tail amputation. This type of docking is banned in some places, and either type of docking can make it difficult for a horse to effectively swat flies. Another controversial practice, tail setting, involves placing the dock of the tail in a device that causes it to be carried at all times in an arched position desired for show. The set is used when the horses are stalled, and removed during performances. It stretches the muscles to keep the tail in position, and is not used after the horse is retired from competition. Sometimes the process is sped up by the controversial practice of nicking or cutting the check ligament that normally pulls the tail downward. This practice is generally only used for a few breeds, such as the American Saddlebred.

== Other show grooming products and supplies ==
=== Highlighter ===
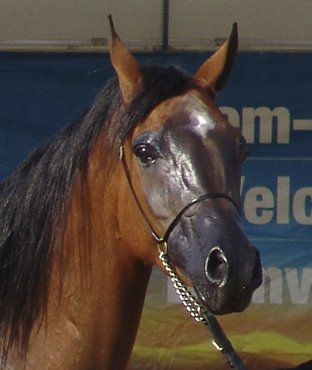
Highlighter has been applied to the entire face of this young halter horse. Most of the hair has also been shaved off the face, as indicated by black areas.

Highlighter is a gel, ointment or oil used to add shine and thus accentuate certain parts of the horse's face. Less often, it is placed on the bridle path, crest, knees, hocks, mane and tail. It is commonly used in the United States by certain breeds such as stock and gaited breeds, but is frowned upon in the Hunter disciplines. In a few disciplines, such products are banned. Most breeds that allow highlighting require it to be clear, without dye or color.

=== Neck sweats ===
Neck sweats are wraps, usually of neoprene, placed on the neck or jowl of the horse to cause it to sweat. This is a short-term method that will temporarily reduce a thick jowl or cresty neck to make it appear finer in appearance. This tool is used both by breeds prone to heavy necks who benefit from some slimming, but also by breeds with refined necks to create a more extreme refinement, often called a "hooky" neck.

=== Coat treatments ===
A number of products, usually in spray form, have been developed to add extra gloss, smoothness, or shine to a coat. Some sprays are oil-based, but because they attract dust, coat enhancement sprays are more commonly oil-free, often called "silicone" sprays, leaving the hair coat very smooth and slick. Most are applied to the horse after it has been bathed and dried, though are occasionally used on a horse that has not been bathed to add a quick gloss for short-term purposes, such as posing for a photograph.

== See also ==
- Groom (profession)
