= Horse management =

Aspect of animal husbandry

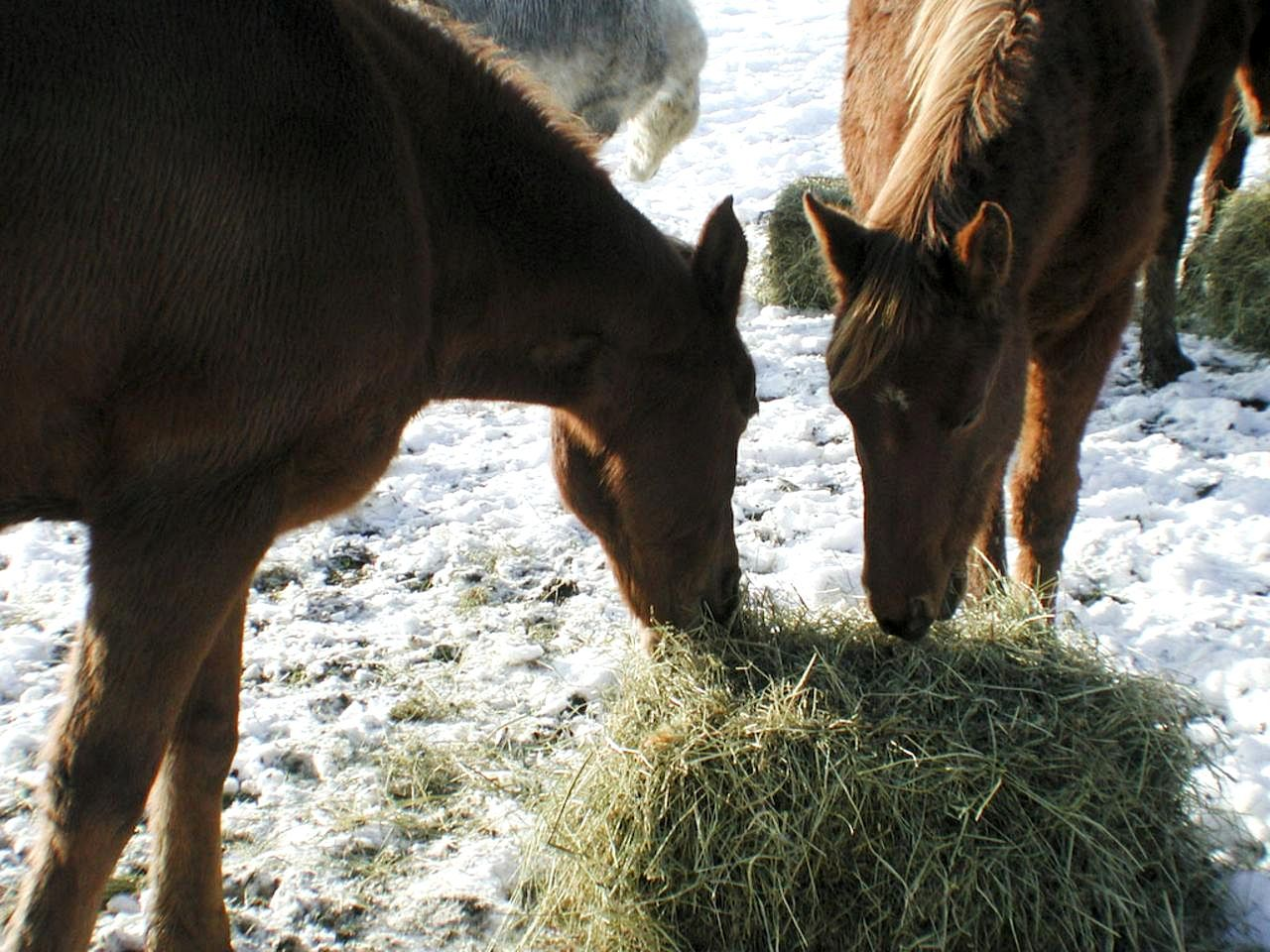
Horses being fed supplemental hay during cold weather

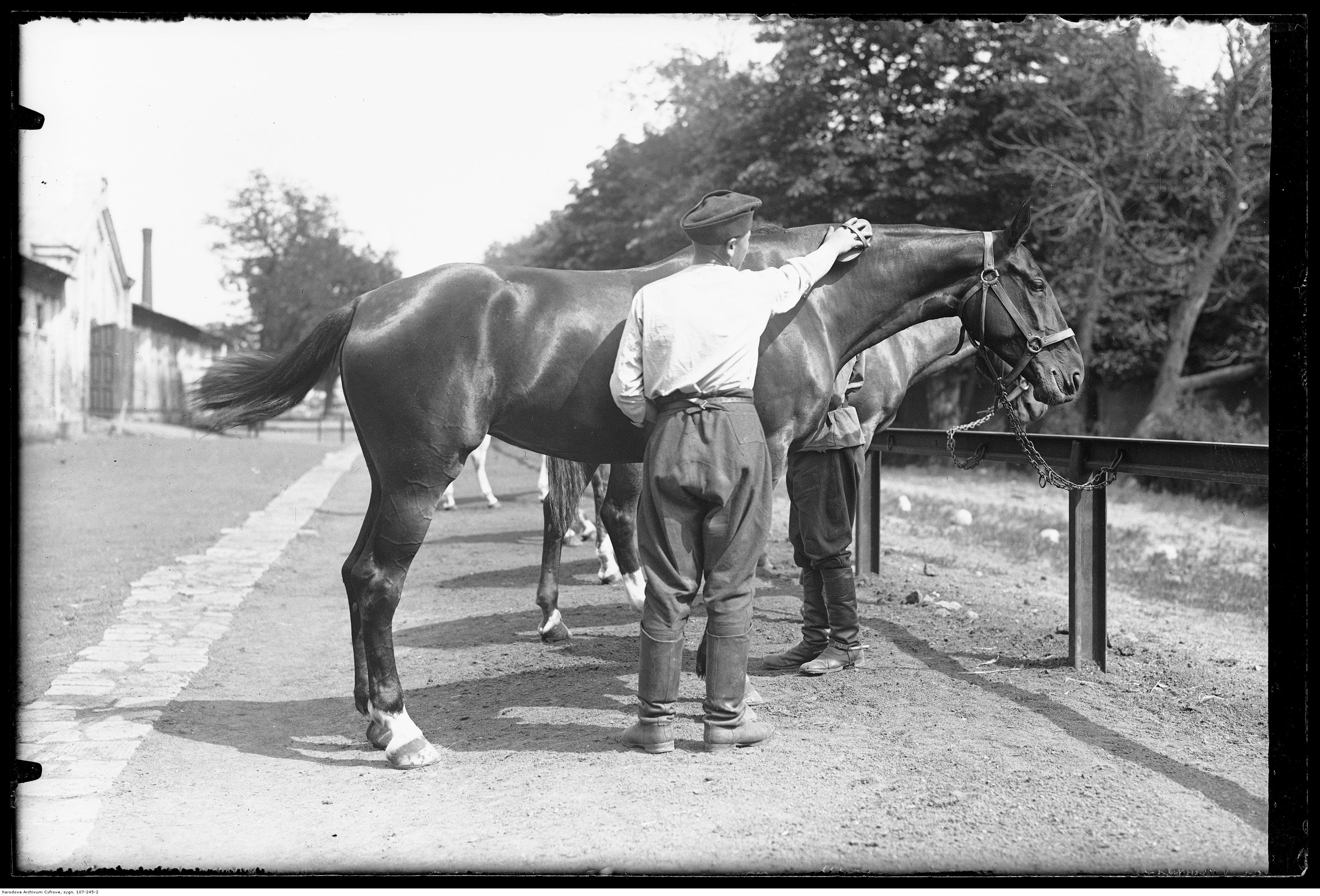
Grooming a horse

Horse management, also called horse husbandry, are the actions taken to care for horses, ponies, mules, donkeys and other domesticated equids, including housing, feeding, hygiene, health, and general welfare.

== Living environment ==
Horses require both shelter from natural elements like wind and precipitation, as well as room to exercise. Worldwide, horses and other equids usually live outside with access to shelter for protection from the elements. In some cases, animals are kept in a barn or stable for ease of access by managers, or for protection from the weather for various reasons. For horse owners who do not own their own land, fields and barns can be rented from a private land owner or space for an individual horse may be rented from a boarding farm. Horses that are not on full-time turnout in a field or pasture normally require some form of regular exercise, whether it is being ridden, longed or turned out for free time. However, if a horse is ill or injured it may need to be confined to a stable, usually in a box stall.

As equines are herd animals, most have better mental behavior when in proximity to other equine company. However, this is not always possible, and it has been known for companionship bonds to develop between horses and cats, goats and other species. There are exceptions. Some horses, particularly stallions are often kept separated from other horses, particularly other males they may challenge for dominance. For safety and monitoring, mares may be separated from a herd prior to foaling.

Horses require access to clean fresh water at all times, and access to adequate forage such as grass or hay. Unless an animal can be fully maintained on pasture with a natural open water source, horses must be fed daily. As horses evolved as continuous grazers, it is better to feed small amounts of feed throughout the day than to feed a large amount at one time.

In the winter, horses grow a heavy hair coat to keep warm and usually stay warm if well-fed and allowed access to shelter. But if kept artificially clipped for show, or if under stress from age, sickness or injury, a horse blanket may need to be added to protect the horse from cold weather. In the summer, access to shade is well-advised.

=== Pastures ===
If a horse is kept in a pasture, the amount of land needed for basic maintenance varies with climate, an animal needs more land for grazing in a dry climate than in a moist one. An average of between one and 3 acres (12,000 m^{2}) of land per horse will provide adequate forage in much of the world, though hay or other feed may have to be supplemented in winter or during periods of drought. To lower the risk of laminitis, horses also may need to be removed from lush, rapidly changing grass for short periods in the spring and fall (autumn), when the grass is particularly high in non-structural carbohydrates such as fructans. Horses turned out to pasture full-time still need to be checked frequently for evidence of injury, parasites, sickness or weight loss.

If the terrain does not provide natural shelter in the form of heavy trees or other windbreaks, an artificial shelter must be provided; a horse's insulating hair coat works less efficiently when wet or when subjected to wind, horses that cannot get away from wind and precipitation put unnecessary energy into maintaining core body warmth and may become susceptible to illness.

Horses cannot live for more than a few days without water. Therefore, even in a natural, semi-feral setting, a check every day is recommended; a stream or irrigation source can dry up, ponds may become stagnant or develop toxic blue-green algae, a fence can break and allow escape, poisonous plants can take root and grow; windstorms, precipitation, or even human vandalism can create unsafe conditions.

Pastures should be rotated when plants are grazed down to avoid overgrazing or deterioration of pasture quality. Manure management is also improved by pasture rotation; horses will not eat grass that contains too much of their own manure and such areas are a breeding ground for parasites. Decomposition of the manure needs to be allowed while the horses are kept in an alternative paddock.

=== Fences and pens ===
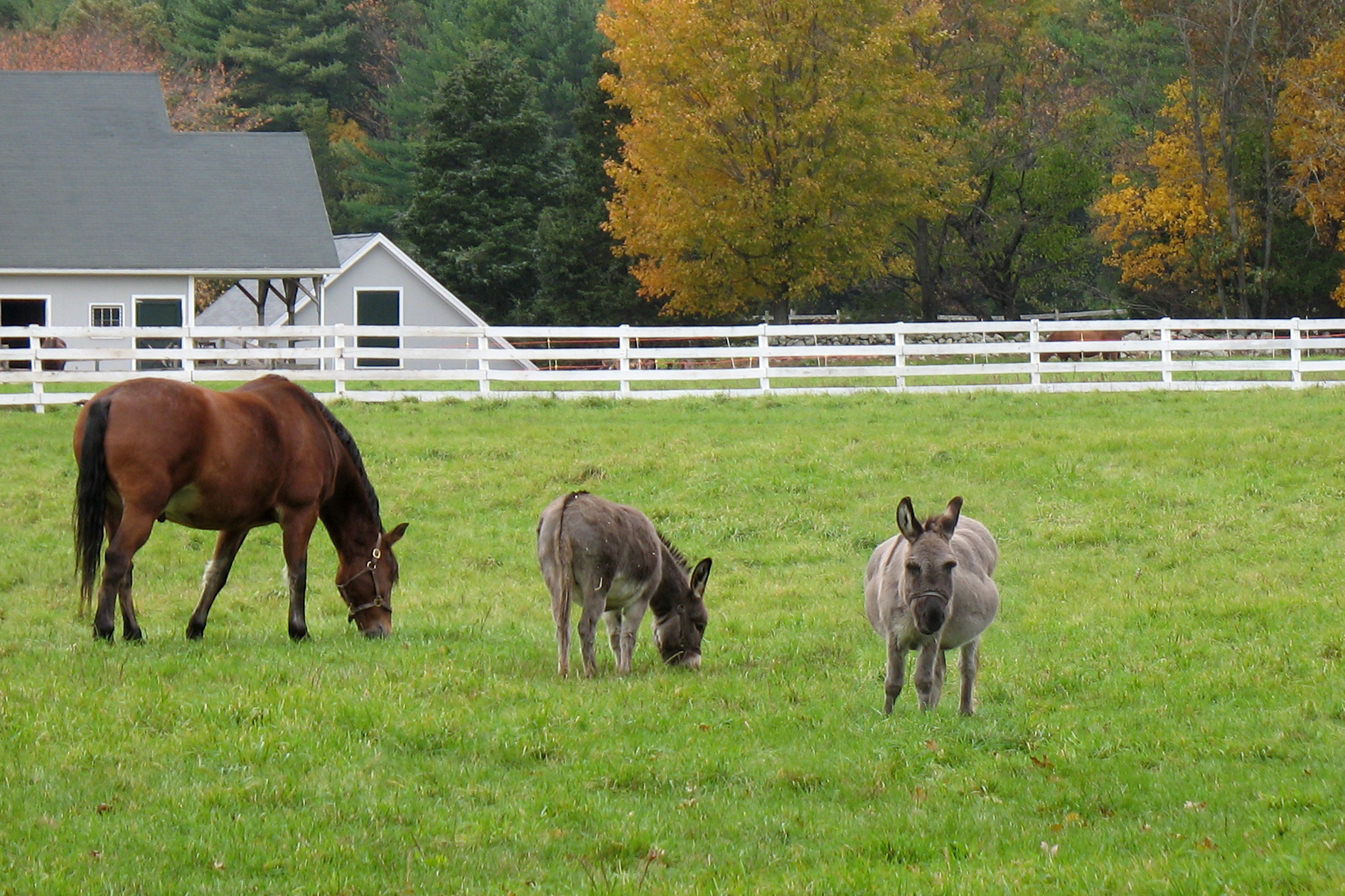
Wood and wood-like synthetics are classic and attractive forms of fencing

Horses evolved to live on prairie grasslands and to cover long distances unfettered by artificial barriers. Therefore, when fenced in, accident potential must be considered. Horses will put their heads and legs through fences in an attempt to reach forage on the other side. They may run into fences if chased by another animal, or even when running at play if the fence (such as a wire fence) is not particularly visible. The smaller the area, the more visible and substantial a fence needs to be.

For exercise alone, a pen, run, corral or "dry lot" without forage can be much smaller than a pasture, and this is a common way that many horses are managed; kept in a barn with a turnout run, or in a dry lot with a shelter, feeding hay, allowing either no pasture access, or grazing for only a few hours per day. Outdoor turnout pens range greatly in size, but 12 feet (4 m) by 20 to 30 feet (9 m) is a bare minimum for a horse that does not get ridden daily. To gallop for short stretches, a horse needs a "run" of at least 50 to 100 feet (30 m). When kept in a dry lot, a barn or shelter is a must. If kept in a small pen, a horse needs to be worked regularly or turned out in a larger area for free exercise.

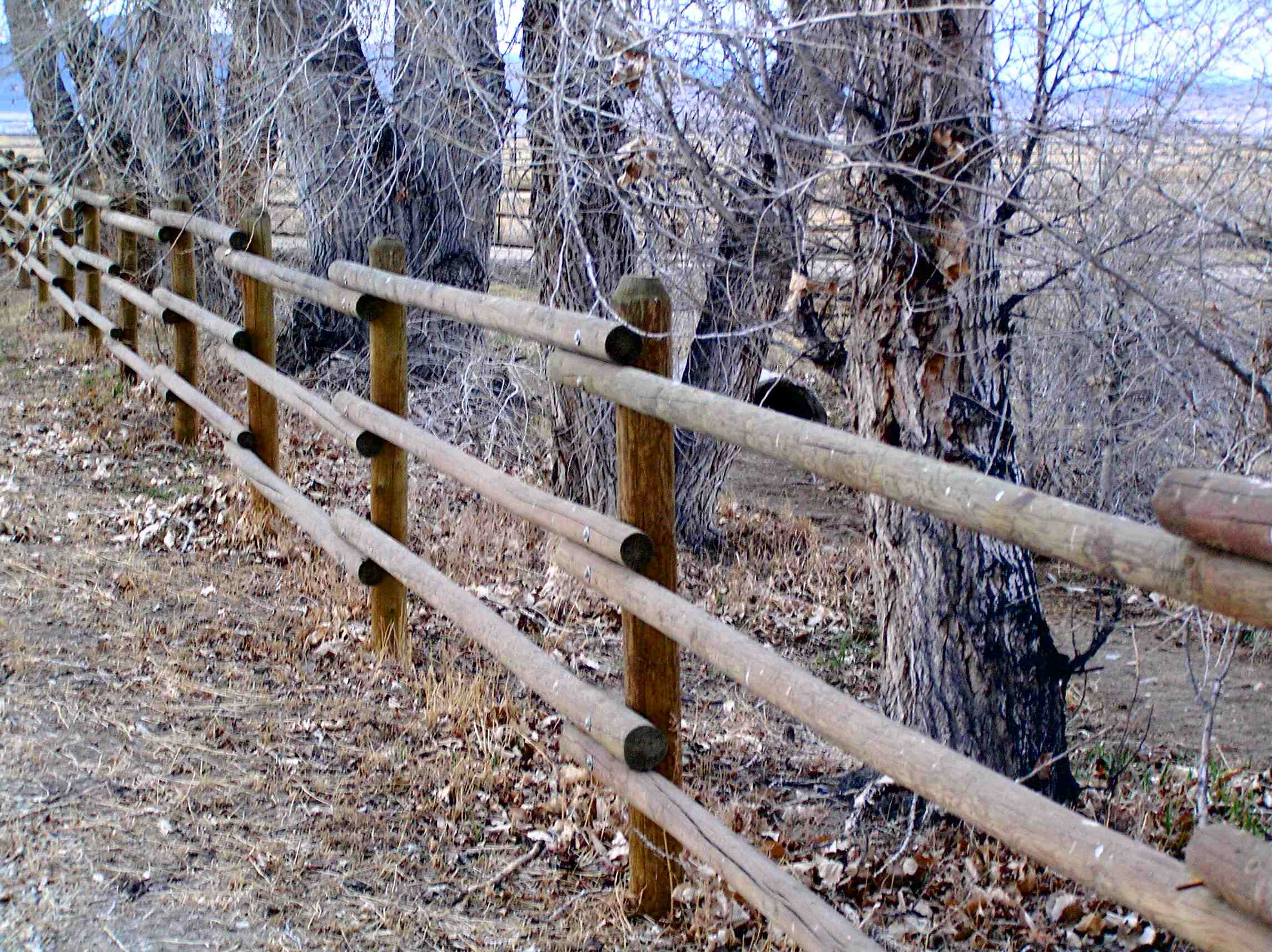
A sturdy and well-made wooden post and rail fence that is suitable for horses

Fences in pens must be sturdy. In close quarters, a horse may contact the fence frequently. Wire is very dangerous in any small pen. Pens are often made of metal pipe, or wood. Larger pens are sometimes enclosed in closely woven mesh, sometimes called "no climb" fencing. However, if a wire mesh is used in a small pen, the openings must be too small for a horse hoof to pass through.

=== Types of fencing ===
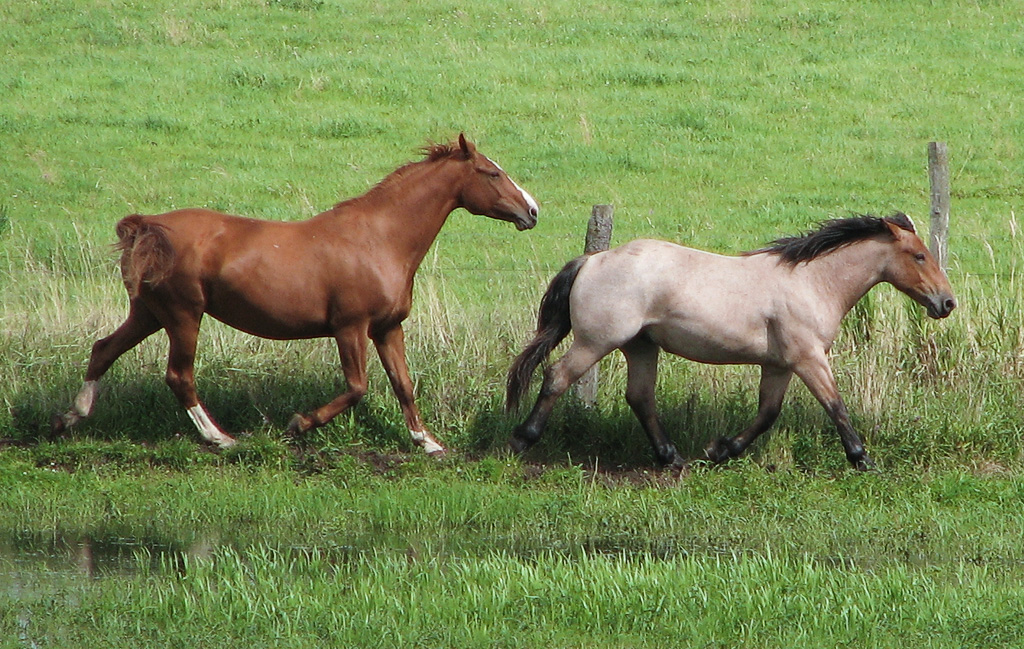
One danger of a wire fence is that, as shown in this photo, it is practically invisible; a running animal may not see the fence until it is too late to avoid running into it. Reflective fencing flags can make the wire fence more visible.

Over vast areas, barbed wire is often seen in some parts of the world, but it is the most dangerous fencing material that can be used around horses, even in a large pasture. If a horse is caught in barbed wire, it can quickly become severely hurt, often leaving lasting scars or even permanent injuries. Horse management books and periodicals are nearly universal in stating that barbed wire should never be used to contain horses. However, this advice is widely ignored, particularly in the western United States.

Various types of smooth wire fencing, particularly when supported by a strand of electric fence, can be used to enclose a large pasture of several acres, and is one of the least expensive fencing options. A wire fence should have at least four, preferably five strands to provide adequate security. However, even without sharp barbs, wire has the highest potential for horses to become tangled in the fence and injured. If used, it must be properly installed and kept tight through regular maintenance. Visibility is also an issue; a horse galloping in an unfamiliar pasture may not see a wire fence until it is too late to stop.

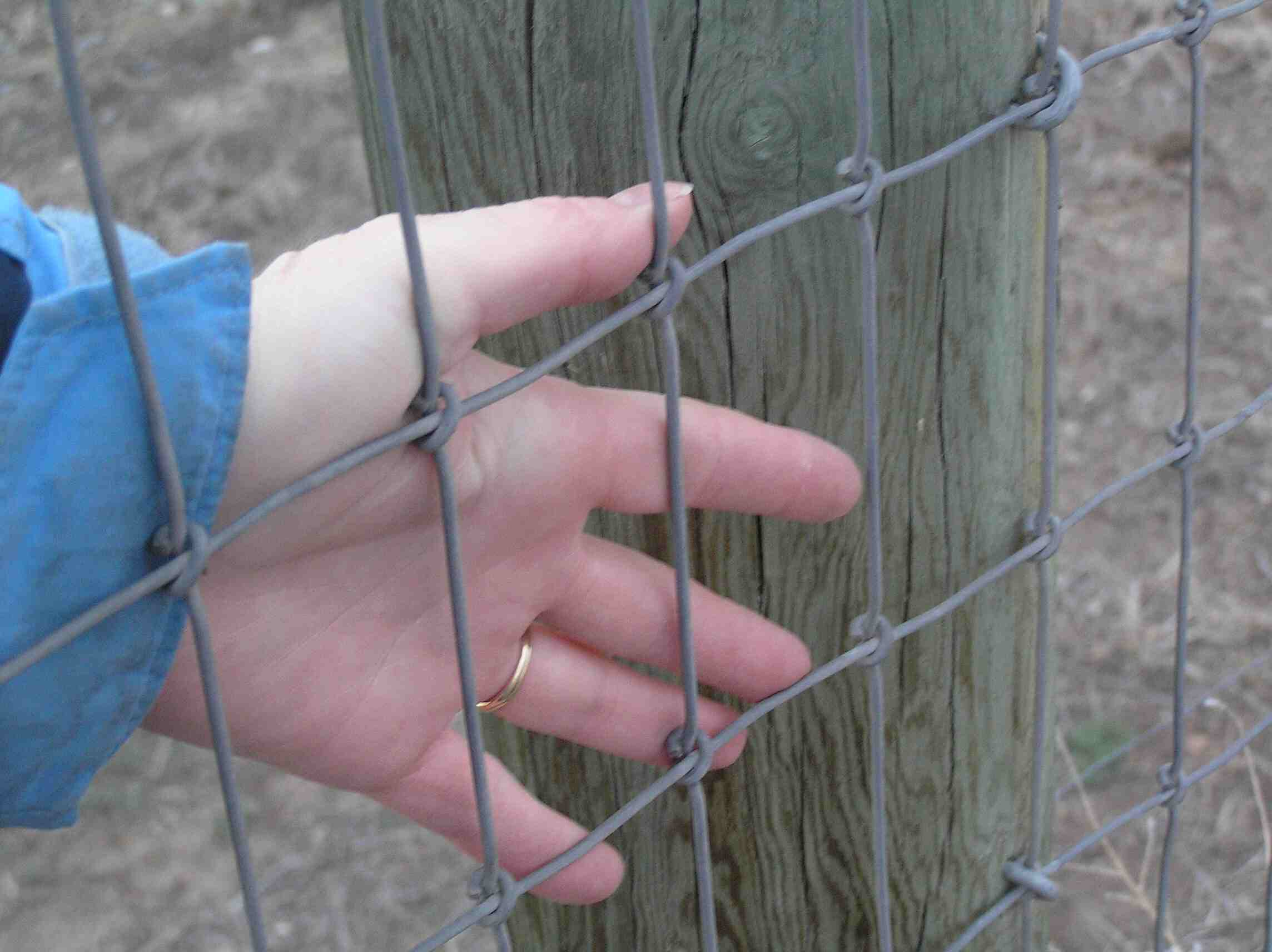
A heavy woven mesh with closely spaced strands is relatively safe for horses, as they cannot easily break the fence nor put a foot through it

Woven mesh wire is safer but more expensive than strands of smooth wire. It is more difficult to install, and has some visibility issues, but horses are less likely to become tangled in it or be injured if they run into it. Adding a top rail of wood or synthetic material increases visibility of the fence and prevents it from being bent by horses reaching over it. A strand of electric fence may also keep horses from pushing on a mesh fence. Mesh fencing needs to be heavy-gauge wire, woven, not welded, and the squares of the mesh should be too small for a horse to put a foot through. "Field fence" or "no-climb" fence are safer designs than more widely woven "sheep fence." Chain link fence is occasionally seen, but horses can bend chain link almost as easily as a thinner-gauge wire, so the additional expense is often not justified by any gain over good-quality woven wire.

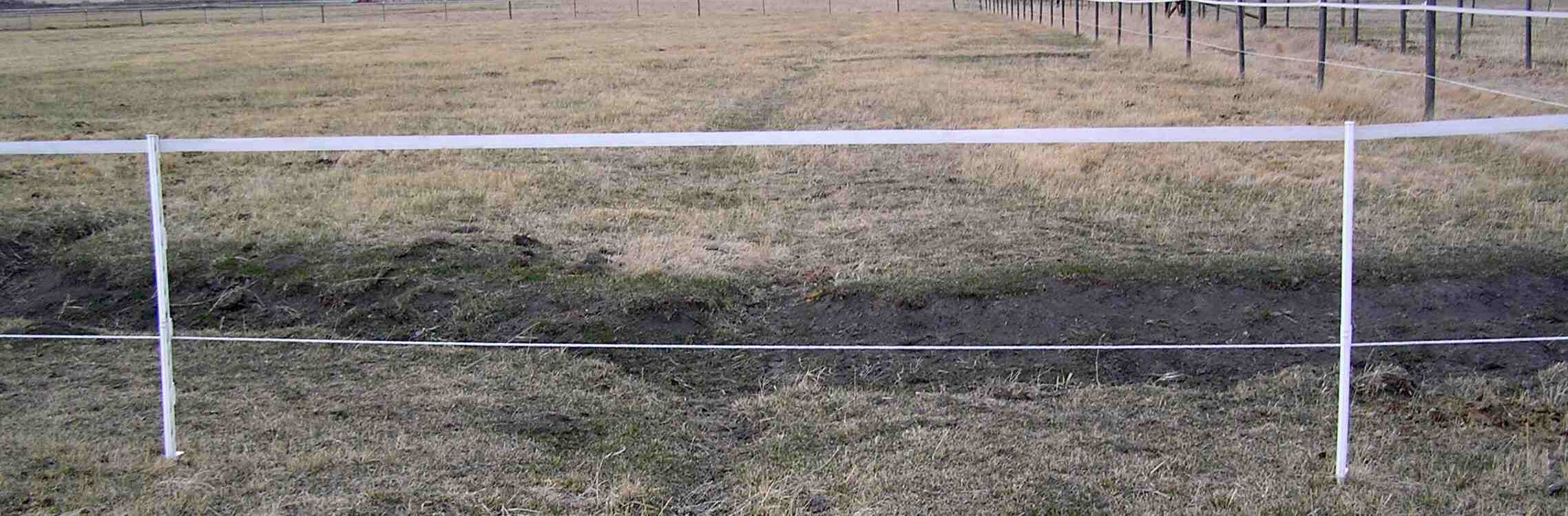
Electric fencing made of modern synthetic materials with fine wire interwoven throughout make a visible and inexpensive fence. Use of plastic posts allows a temporary fence to be set up and moved easily as needed. An electric fence such as this is good for dividing up a grazing area, but should not be used as a boundary fence or in areas where animals will put a lot of pressure on the fence

Electric fence comes in many styles of wire, rope and webbing, and is particularly useful for internal division of pastures. It carries only a mild charge that causes a noticeable shock, but no permanent injury to animals or people. It is relatively inexpensive and is easy to install, but if electricity fails, it is easily broken. It is excellent both as a temporary fence and, in single strands, as a top or middle barrier to keep horses away from conventional fencing. There is some danger that horses can become tangled in an electric fence, though because the materials are finer, it usually breaks, stopping the current, though injuries are still possible. Because electricity can fail, it should not be the sole fencing used on property boundaries, particularly next to roads, though a strand on top may be used to keep a horse from leaning over a fence made of other materials. Nor should it be used alone in small pens where horses may accidentally bump into it on a regular basis. However, small single-horse enclosures are sometimes seen at endurance riding competition, where temporary fencing must be set up in remote areas. In residential areas, warning signs should be posted on any boundary fences with electrified sections to keep people from touching the fence and accidentally being shocked.

Wood is the "classic" form of horse fencing, either painted planks or natural round rails. It is one of the safest materials for containing horses. Wood or a synthetic material with similar properties is the best option for small paddocks, pens and corrals. It can be used to fence pastures and has some ability to give or break if a horse collides with it. However, wood is expensive, high maintenance and not completely without safety concerns; boards can splinter, nails can stick out and cause lacerations. Wood-like synthetics are even more expensive, but are often safer and lower maintenance.

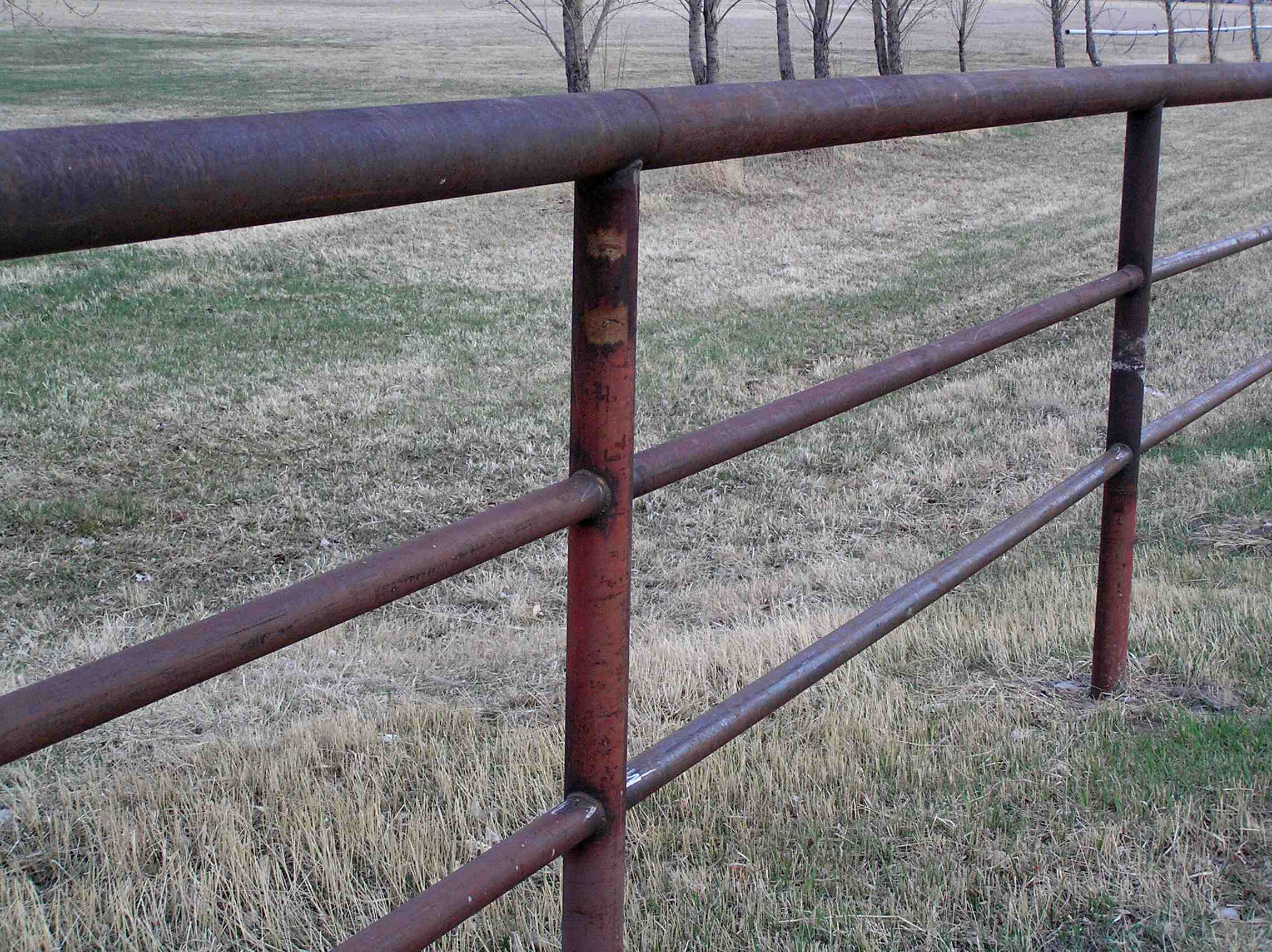
A pipe fence will not break.

Cable of various sorts is sometimes used for horse fencing, and, especially if combined with a top rail or pipe or wood, can be reasonably safe. However, if cable is not kept tight, like wire, horses can be tangled in it. However, it not only cannot break but unlike wire, it also cannot easily be cut by humans. Its advantage over wire is that it poses less of a risk of entanglement. It is often less expensive than wood or pipe, has some give if a horse runs into it, and requires relatively little maintenance.

Metal pipe is often used for fences instead of wood and if properly installed, can be fairly safe in the right circumstances. Pipe is often the most expensive fencing option, but is low maintenance and is very strong. Pipe will generally not give or break if it is run into or if the horse puts a foot through it, which can itself be a potential injury risk; horse owners debate the relative merits and dangers of pipe versus wood for horse fencing. Usually pipe is most suitable for very small areas such as pens where a horse may often bump or test the fence, but will not be at risk of colliding with the fence at full speed.

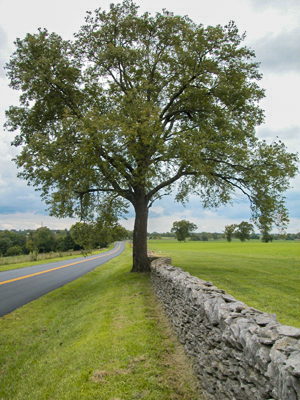
A Kentucky limestone fence.

Solid wall masonry fences, typically either brick or fieldstone, are a type of horse fencing with an ancient tradition. Advantages of stone fences are high visibility, durability, strength and safety. Horses cannot get caught or tangled in them, put legs through, and if a horse runs into one, the impact is spread over much of the body, rather than concentrated on a single spot. They will last for decades with only minor repairs. The major disadvantage is the cost: the materials are expensive, fences require skilled labor for proper construction, and take longer to build.

=== Barns and stables ===
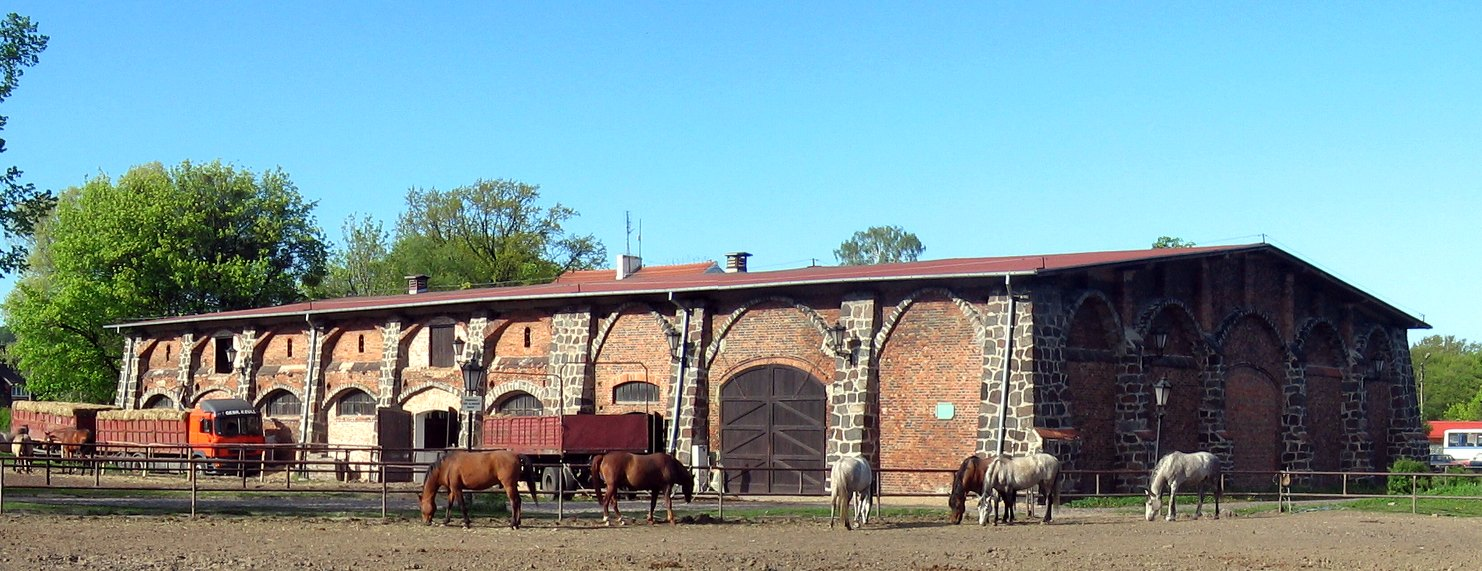
A large horse stable in Poland.

Horses are sometimes kept indoors in buildings called either barns or stables. The terms are often used interchangeably; a barn is the more general term for a rural building that houses livestock, the term stable is more often used in urban areas and can be used as a noun to refer to the building that houses horses or the collection of horses themselves, or as a verb to describe the act of keeping horses in a stable. These buildings are usually unheated and well-ventilated; horses may develop respiratory problems when kept in damp or stuffy conditions. Most horse barns have a number of box stalls inside, that allow many horses to be safely stabled together in separate quarters. There are also separate areas or even rooms for feed, equipment and tack storage and, in some large stables, there may be additional facilities such as a veterinary treatment area or a washing area in the building. Barns may be designed to hold one horse in the backyard of a family home, or be a commercial operation capable of holding dozens of animals.

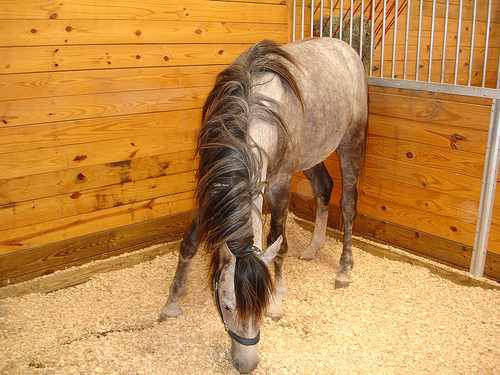
Box stalls in a barn or stable should be of sturdy construction and cleaned daily

The standard dimensions for a box stall (called a "box" in the UK, and a "stall" in the USA) vary from 10' by 12' to 14' by 14', depending on local cultural traditions, the breed of horse, gender, and any special needs. Mares with foals often are kept in double stalls. Stallions, kept alone with less access to turnout, are also often given larger quarters. Ponies sometimes are kept in smaller box stalls, and warmbloods or draft horses may need larger ones. Horses kept in stables need daily exercise and may develop stable vices if they are not given work or turnout. Box stalls usually contain a layer of absorbent bedding such as straw or wood shavings and need to be cleaned daily; a horse generates approximately 15 pounds (6.8 kg) of manure and several gallons of urine each day. There are health risks to the horse if forced to stand all day in its own waste. However, stables are built as much for the convenience of humans as horses; most healthy horses are equally, if not more, comfortable in a field or paddock with a simple three-sided shed that protects them from the elements.

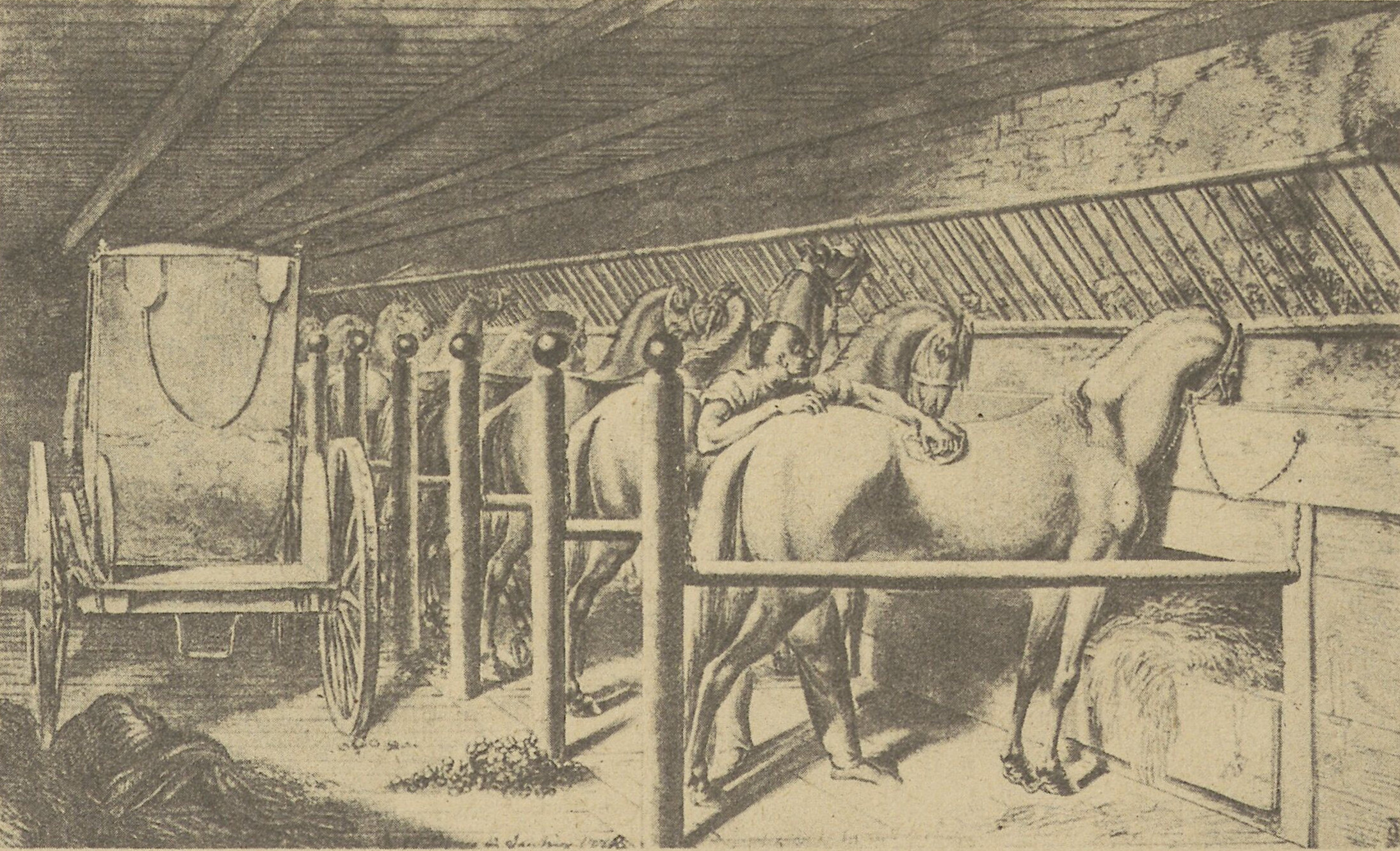
A set of tie stalls in an 18th-century stable

In some parts of the world, horses that are worked daily are kept in tie stalls, usually about 5 to 6 feet (2 m) wide and 8 to 10 feet (3 m) long. As the name implies, a horse is tied, usually to a ring in front of a hay manger, and cannot turn around in a tie stall. But if the stall is wide enough, it can lay down. Tie stalls were used extensively prior to the 20th century, and barns with tie stalls are still seen in some regions, particularly in poorer countries, at older fairgrounds and agricultural exposition facilities, but are not used as often in modern barns.

== Feeding ==
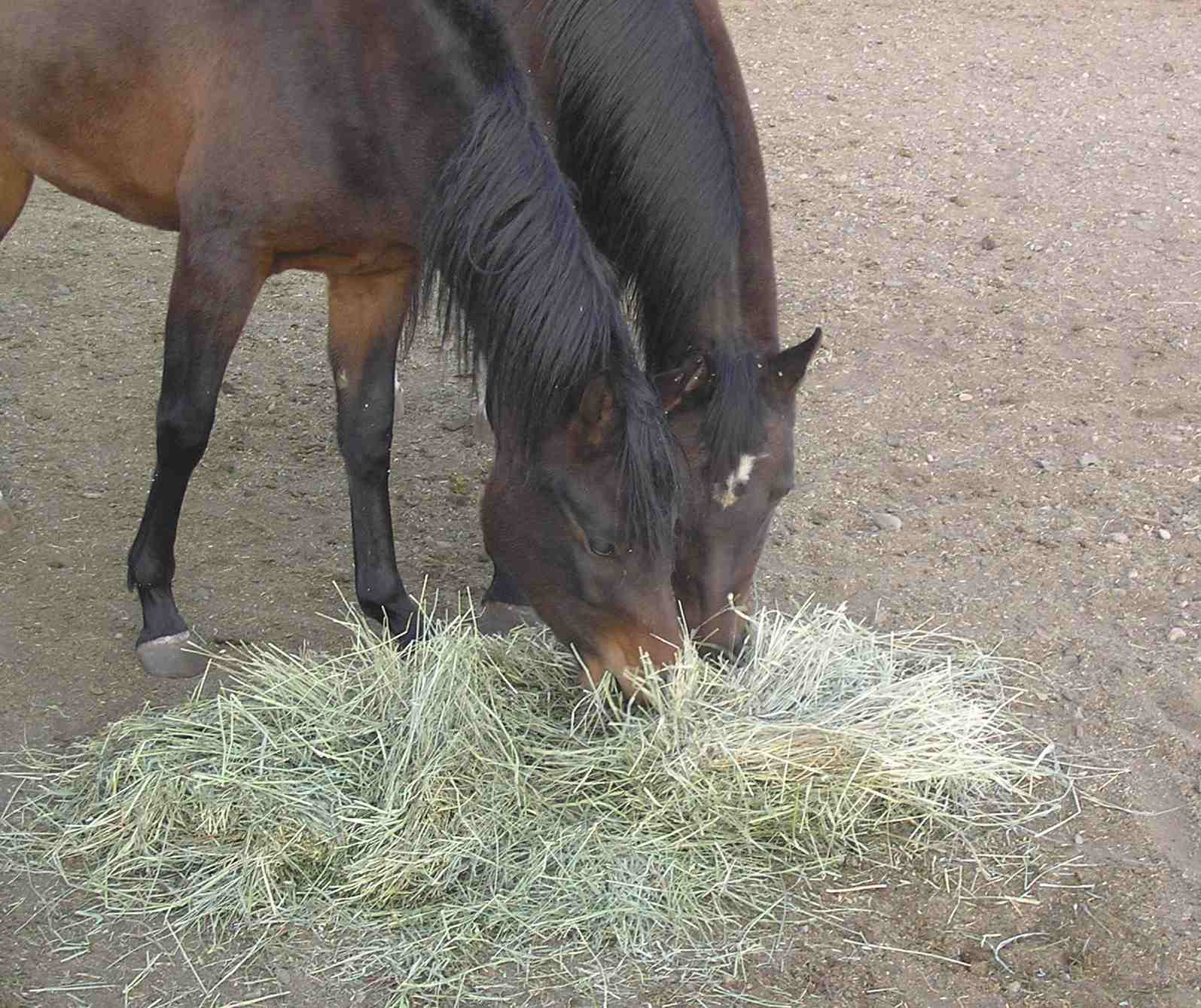
Forages, such as hay, are required by all horses

A horse or pony needs approximately 1.5% to 2.5% of its body weight in food per day, depending on its age and level of work. This may include forages such as grass or hay and concentrates such as grain or commercially prepared pelleted feeds. Best practice is to feed horses small quantities multiple times daily, unless they are on full-time pasture. Fresh, clean water should be provided free choice at all times, unless there is a specific reason to limit water intake for a short period of time. Some horse owners add vitamin or mineral supplements, some with nutraceutical ingredients that offer many different benefits.

Like people, some horses are "easy keepers" and prone to obesity, while others are "hard keepers" and need a great deal of food just to maintain a slim build. The average riding horse weighs roughly 1,000 pounds (450 kg), but the weight of a horse can be more closely estimated using a weight tape, which can be purchased from a feed store or tack shop.

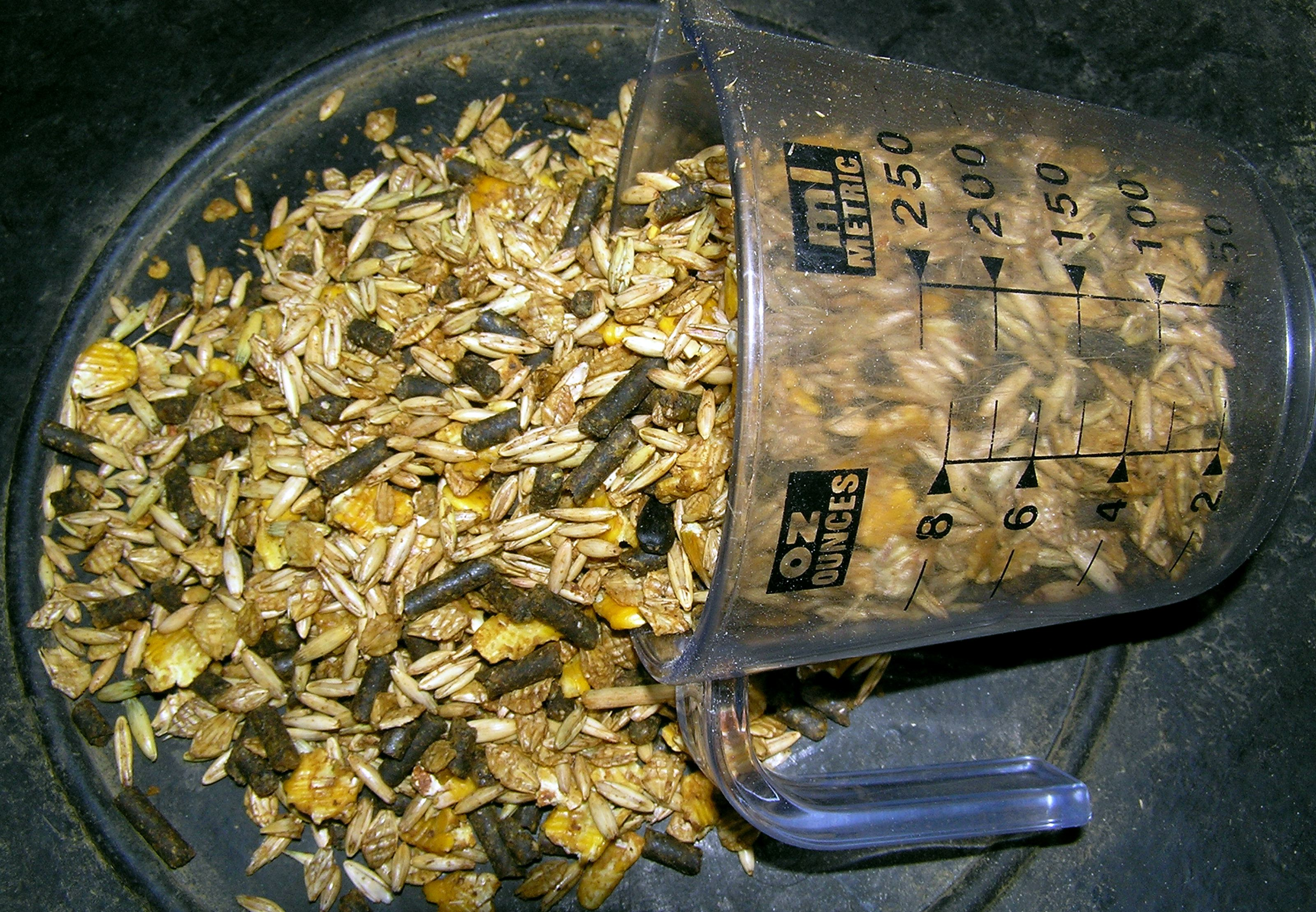
a sweet feed mix with added vitamins

A horse that is not ridden daily or subjected to other stressors can maintain adequate nutrition on pasture or hay alone, with adequate water (10–12 US gallons (38–45 L; 8.3–10.0 imp gal) per day average) and free access to a salt block or loose salt. However, horses and ponies in regular work often need a ration of both forage and concentrates.

Horses that are fed improperly may develop colic or laminitis, particularly if fed spoiled feed, subjected to excessive feed, or an abrupt change of feed. Young horses who are improperly fed may develop growth disorders due to an imbalance of nutrients. Young horses may also develop osteochondrosis if they are overfed. Regularly monitoring the horse's body condition score on a regular basis assists in helping the horse maintain proper weight.

== Grooming ==
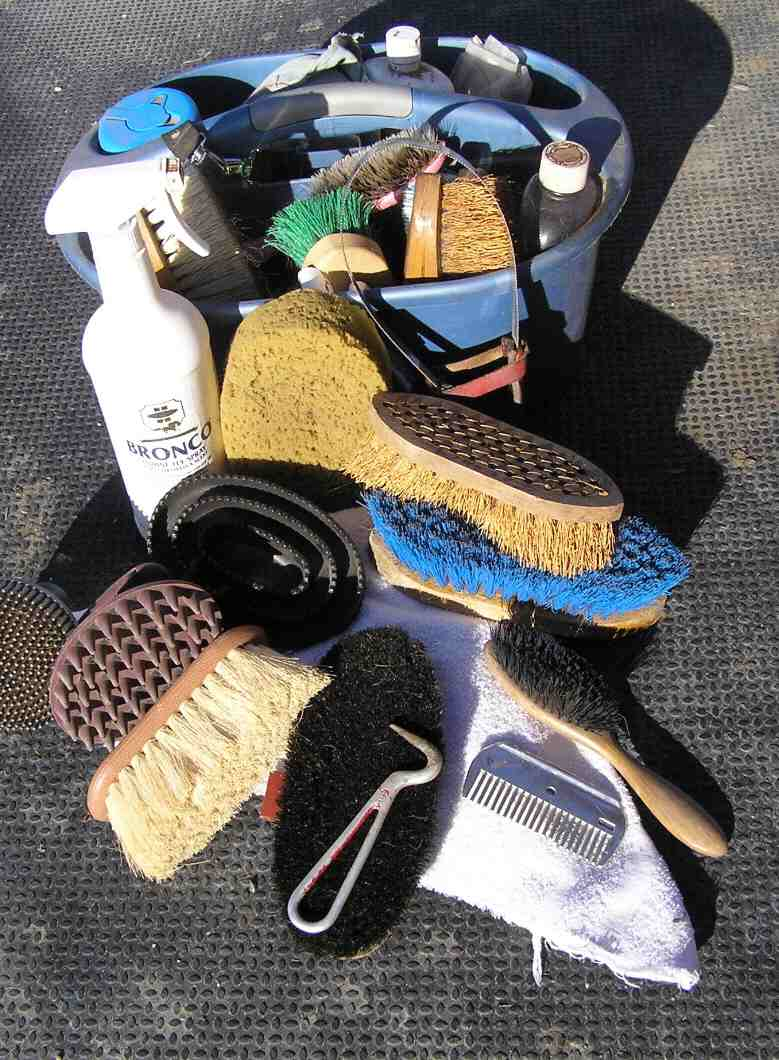
An assortment of brushes and other tools are used to groom a horse

Horses groomed regularly have healthier and more attractive coats. Many horse management handbooks recommend grooming a horse daily, though for the average modern horse owner, this is not always possible. However, a horse should always be groomed before being ridden to avoid chafing and rubbing of dirt and other material, which can cause sores on the animal and also grind dirt into horse tack. Grooming also allows the horse handler to check for injuries and is a good way to gain the trust of the animal.

Proper basic grooming of a horse is a multi-step process involving several simple tools:

1. Curry, curry comb, or currycomb: Usually a round tool with short teeth made of plastic or stiff rubber, used to loosen dirt, hair, and other detritus, plus stimulate the skin to produce natural oils.
2. Dandy brush: A stiff-bristled, "dandy" brush is used to remove the dirt, hair and other material stirred up by the curry. The best quality dandy brushes are made of stiff natural bristles such as rice stems; plastic-bristled dandy brushes are more common.
3. Body brush: A soft-bristled "body" brush removes finer particles and dust. Some natural body brushes are made of boar bristles, like human hairbrushes, others are made of soft synthetic fibers.
4. Grooming rag or towel: A terrycloth towel or other type of cloth. Sometimes called a "stable rubber."
5. Mane brush or comb: Horses with short, pulled manes have their manes combed with a wide-toothed plastic or metal comb. Horse tails and long manes many be finger-combed or are brushed with either a dandy brush, body brush, or a suitable human hairbrush.
6. Hoof pick: All four feet of the horse need to be cleaned out and inspected for signs of injury or infection. See "Hoof care and shoeing," below.
7. In special weather conditions, a metal shedding blade with short, dull teeth is used to remove loose winter hair. Metal grooming tools used on sheep and show cattle may also be too harsh to use on a horse.
8. In the summer, fly spray is often applied to the horse after grooming.
9. Sweat or Water Scraper: A metal or plastic tool to remove excess liquid from a horse's coat.
10. Sometimes, though not always, horses are clipped with scissors or, preferably, electric clippers. The most common areas are a short "bridle path" just behind the ears, where a few inches of mane is removed to help the bridle lay more neatly; and the fetlocks, where extra hair can collect undesired amounts of mud and dirt. For horse show and exhibition purposes, additional clipping may be done.

Beyond the basic equipment, there are thousands of other grooming tools on the market, from multiple designs on the basic brushes, available in many colors, to specialized tools for braiding manes, polishing hooves and clipping loose hair. There are also grooming products for horses ranging from moisturizing hair dressings to glitter gel and hoof polish.

Horses can be bathed by being wet down with a garden hose, but they do not require bathing and many horses live their entire lives without a bath. Either horse or human shampoo may be safely used on a horse, if thoroughly rinsed out, and cream rinses or hair conditioners, similar to those used by humans, are often used on show horses. Too-frequent shampooing can strip the hair coat of natural oils and cause it to dry out. A well-groomed, clean horse can be kept clean by wearing a horse blanket or horse sheet.

A horse show class that considers quality of grooming for as much as 40% of the total score is called showmanship.

== Hoof care and shoeing ==
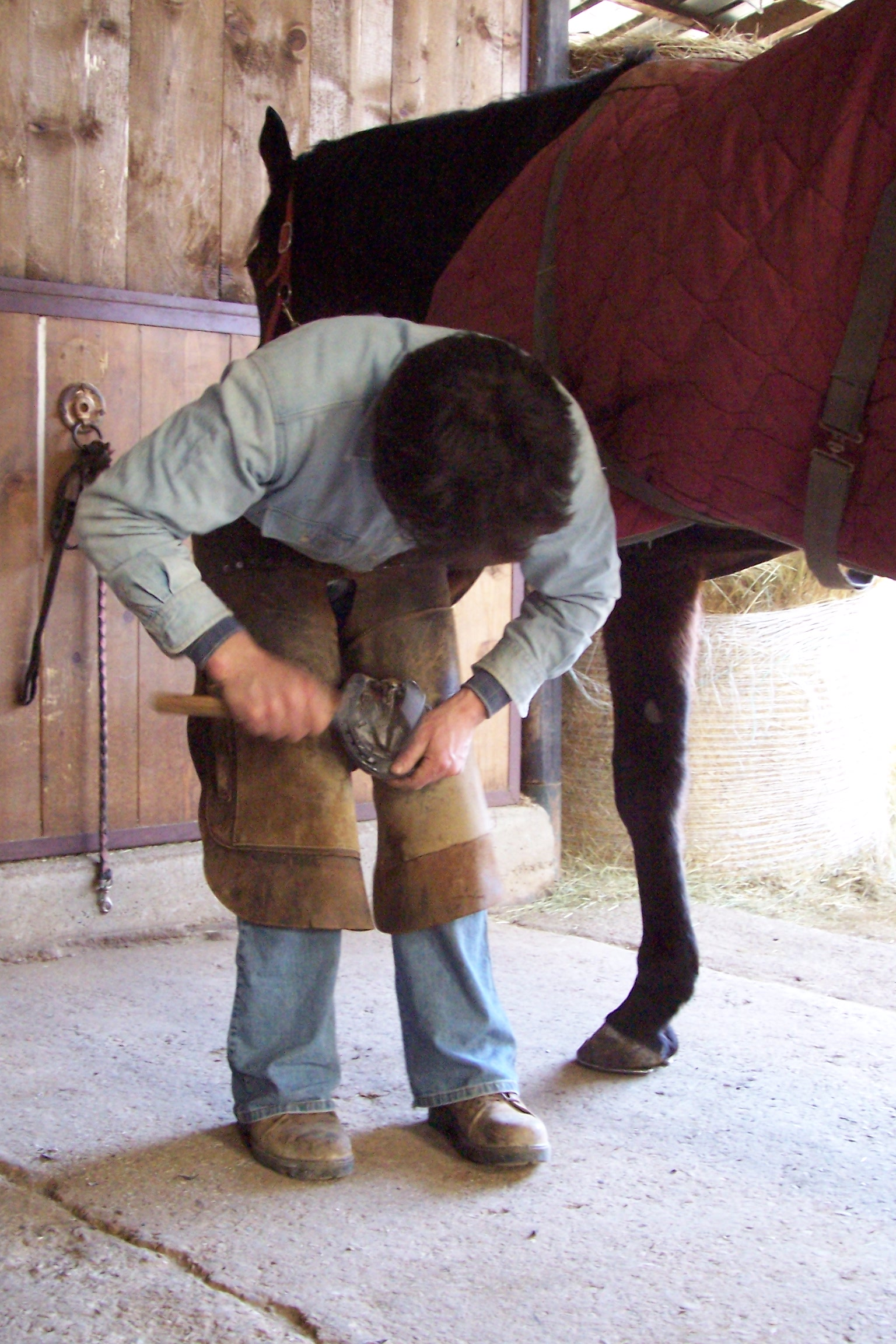
Horses require routine hoof care

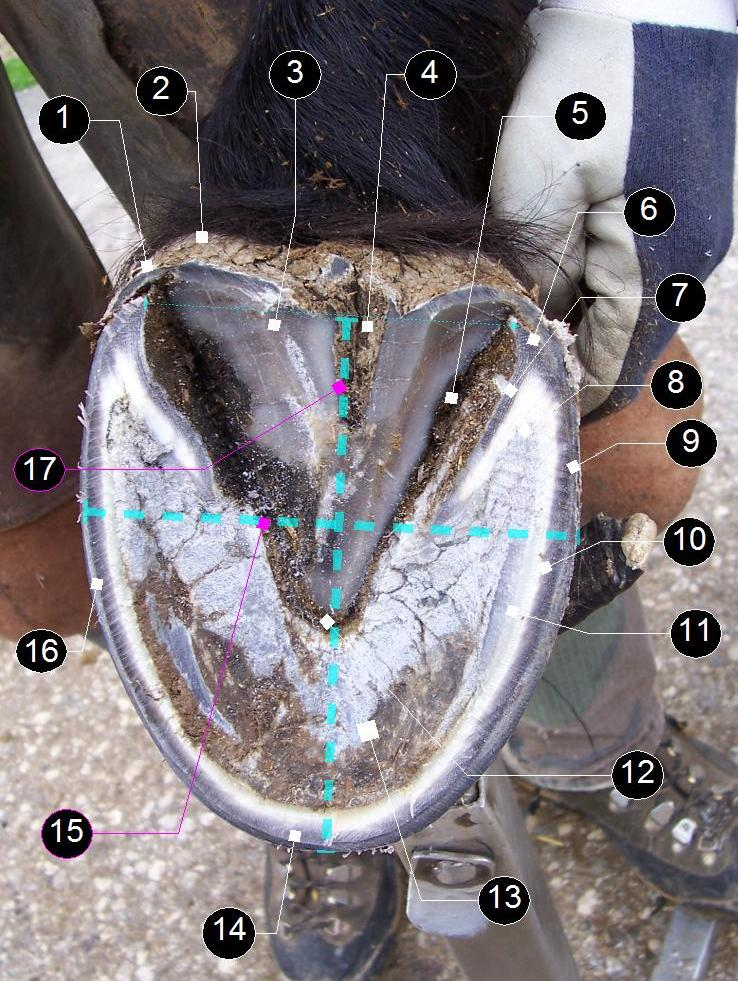
Barefoot hoof, from below. Details: heel perioplium (1), bulb (2), frog (3), central groove (4), collateral groove (5), heel (6), bar (7), seat of corn (8), pigmented walls (external layer) (9), water line (inner layer) (10), white line (11), apex of frog (12), sole (13), toe (14), how to measure width (15), quarter (16), how to measure length (17)

The hooves of a horse or pony are cleaned by being picked out with a hoof pick to remove any stones, mud and dirt and to check that the shoes (if worn) are in good condition. Keeping feet clean and dry wherever possible helps prevent both lameness as well as hoof diseases such as thrush (a hoof fungus). The feet should be cleaned every time the horse is ridden, and if the horse is not ridden, it is still best practice to check and clean feet frequently. Daily cleaning is recommended in many management books, though if horses are on turnout and not being ridden, a weekly hoof check of healthy horses is often sufficient during good weather.

Use of hoof oils, dressings, or other topical treatments varies by region, climate, and the needs of the individual horse. Many horses have healthy feet their entire lives without need for any type of hoof dressing. Farriers and veterinarians in a horse owner's local area can provide advice on the use and misuse of topical hoof dressings, offering suggestions tailored for the needs of the individual horse.

Horses and ponies require routine hoof care by a professional farrier on average every six to eight weeks, depending on the animal, the work it performs and, in some areas, climate conditions. Hooves usually grow faster in the spring and fall than in summer or winter. They also appear to grow faster in warm, moist weather than in cold or dry weather. In damp climates, the hooves tend to spread out more and wear down less than in dry climates, though more lush, growing forage may also be a factor. Thus, a horse kept in a climate such as that of Ireland may need to have its feet trimmed more frequently than a horse kept in a drier climate such as Arizona, in the southwestern United States.

All domesticated horses need regular hoof trims, regardless of use. Horses in the wild do not need hoof trims because they travel as much as 50 miles (80 km) a day in dry or semi-arid grassland in search of forage, a process that wears their feet naturally. Domestic horses in light use are not subjected to such severe living conditions and hence their feet grow faster than they can be worn down. Without regular trimming, their feet can get too long, eventually splitting, chipping and cracking, which can lead to lameness.

Horses subjected to hard work may need horseshoes for additional protection. Some advocates of the barefoot horse movement maintain that proper management may reduce or eliminate the need for shoes, or propose hoof boots as an alternative. Certain activities, such as horse racing and police horse work, create unnatural levels of stress and will wear down hooves faster than they would in nature. Thus, some types of working horses almost always require some form of hoof protection.

The cost of farrier work varies widely, depending on the part of the world, the type of horse to be trimmed or shod, and any special issues with the horse's foot that may require more complex care. The cost of a trim is roughly half to one-third that of the cost of a set of shoes, and professional farriers are typically paid at a level commeasurate with other skilled labourers in an area, such as plumbers or electricians, though farriers charge by the horse rather than by the hour.

In the United Kingdom, it is illegal for anyone other than a registered farrier to shoe a hoof or prepare the hoof to receive a shoe. It is not illegal in the UK for anyone to trim hooves for maintenance or cosmetic purposes, as long as it is not done preparatory to the application of a shoe. The farrier should have any one of the following qualifications, the FWCF being the most highly skilled:

- DipWCF (Diploma of the Worshipful Company of Farriers)
- AWCF (Associateship of the Worshipful Company of Farriers)
- FWCF (Fellowship of the Worshipful Company of Farriers)

In the United States, there are no legal restrictions on who may do farrier work. However, there are professional organizations, such as the American Farrier's Association (AFA), that maintain a voluntary certification program. Levels of certification in the AFA include:

- CF (Certified Farrier),
- CTF (Certified Tradesman Farrier),
- CJF (Certified Journeyman Farrier)

For each level of certification, farriers must pass written exams (addressing anatomy, physiology, and biomechanics), forging exams (modifications to keg shoes and building shoes from barstock), and live shoeing exams. Once a farrier has completed the highest level of certification (the CJF), he or she can also pursue Specialty Endorsements, such as the TE (Therapeutic Endorsement).

== Leg care and bandaging ==
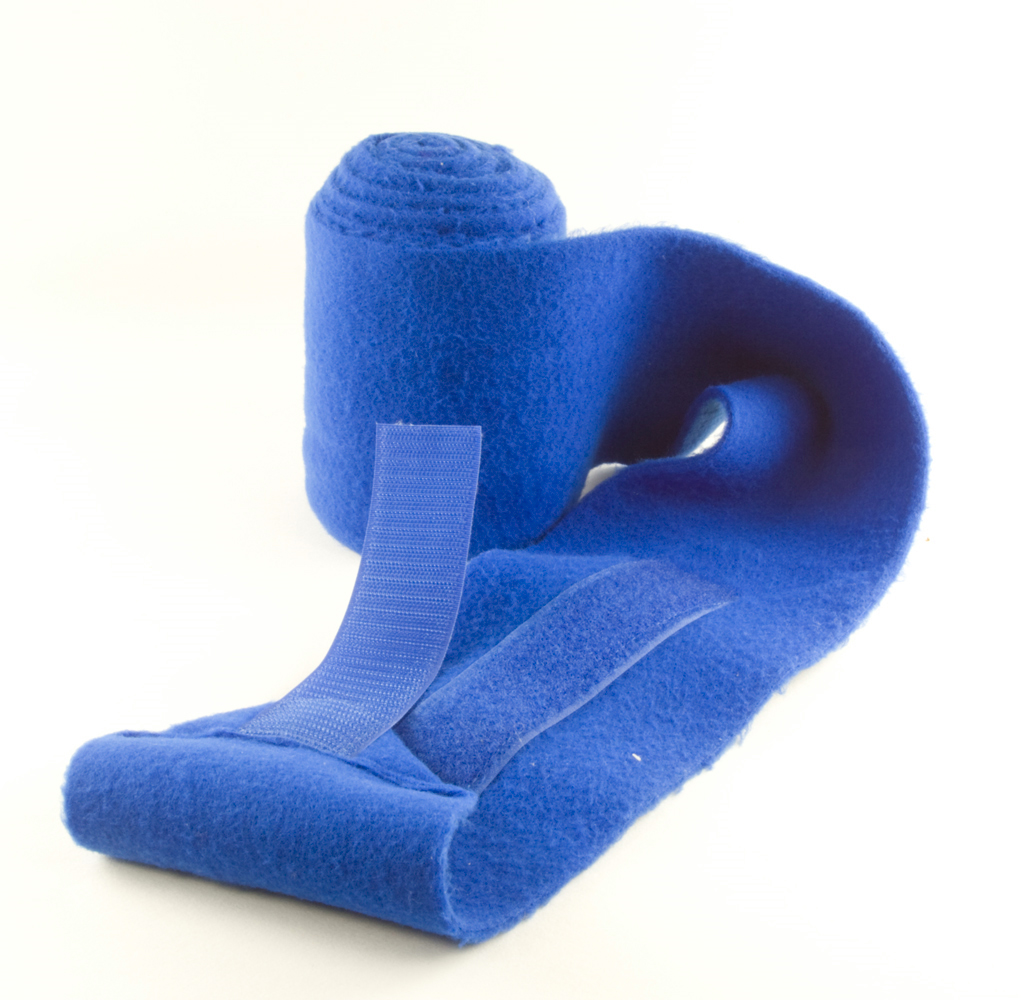
Leg bandage

The legs of a horse require routine observation for lacerations or swelling. Everyday care involves brushing the legs with a brush to remove dirt and mud. A currycomb is generally not used below the knees. It is common to have excess hair trimmed from the fetlock to prevent excess accumulation of mud and moisture that may lead to skin problems, such as rain rot or scratches. Many riders wrap the horse's legs with protective boots or bandages to prevent injury while working or exercising. After a ride, it is common for a rider or groom to hose off the legs of a horse to remove dirt and to ease any minor inflammation to the tendons and ligaments. Liniment may also be applied as a preventative measure to minimize stiffness and ease any minor strain or swelling. If the horse has been overworked, injured, or is to be transported, a standing bandage or shipping boot may be placed on the horse's legs for protection, to hold a wound dressing, or to provide support. Leg wraps are useful in preventing injury or for treating horses with leg injuries. Veterinarians may recommend using wraps during rehabilitation to prevent further injury. Another common use for leg wraps is to protect the legs of horses while being shipped in a horse trailer.

Wrapping legs requires care and skill. A too loose bandage will fall off, potentially tangling in the horse's legs, causing panic or injury. A too tight bandage may cause injury to tendons, ligaments and possible circulation problems. Commercial boots for riding or shipping are simpler to apply as they attach with a hook and loop fastening, or, less often, with adjustable buckles. Leg bandages require more attention. A bandage is usually applied over a protective padding of roll cotton or a premade quilted pad. The bandage is started on the outside of the leg, in the middle of the cannon bone, then wrapped down to either the fetlock or the hoof, depending on the purpose for which it is used, then back up to just under the knee, then back to the center of the cannon just above the starting point, ending on the outside of the leg. When wrapping a horses leg the left leg is wrapped in a counter-clockwise direction, and the right leg is wrapped in a clockwise direction, starting on the outside, moving front to back. Legs may be bandaged with either disposable stretchable wrap that sticks to itself, or with washable fleece or cotton wraps that are reusable and fasten at the ends with a hook and loop closure. Bandages may also be taped with medical tape to help them stay on.

== Veterinary care ==
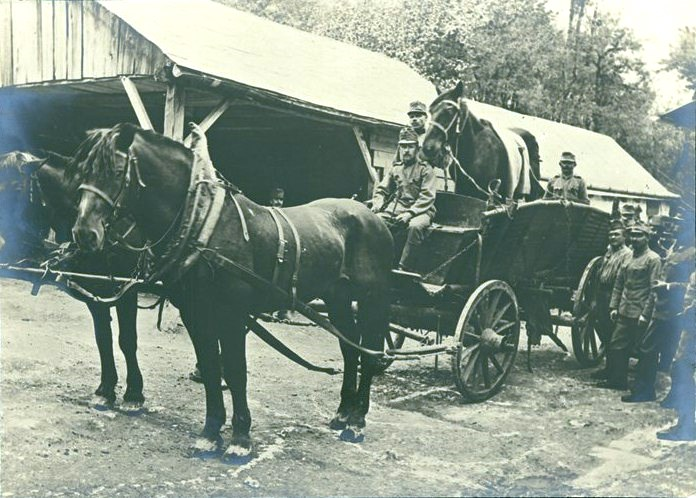
Transporting a horse for treatment, Austro-Hungary, 1914 - 1918

There are many disorders that affect horses, including colic, laminitis, and internal parasites. Horses also can develop various infectious diseases that can be prevented by routine vaccination. It is sensible to register a horse or pony with a local equine veterinarian, in case of emergency. The veterinary practice will keep a record of the owner's details and where the horse or pony is kept, and any medical details. It is considered best practice for a horse to have an annual checkup, usually in the spring. Some practitioners recommend biannual checkups, in the spring and fall.

=== Vaccinations and travel requirements ===
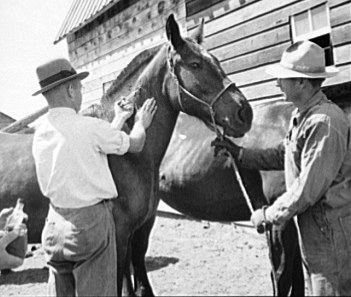
Vaccinating a horse against encephalitis, Idaho, 1940

Horses and ponies need annual vaccinations to protect against any number of sicknesses, though the precise vaccines required varies depending on the part of the world where the horse lives and the uses to which the animal is put. In most nations, rabies and tetanus shots are commonly given, and in many places, various forms of equine encephalitis are a concern as well as West Nile virus. Horses that travel or are exposed to other horses that travel are often recommended to receive equine influenza vaccines, since the disease is highly communicable. In the United States, many people also vaccinate against Equine Herpes Virus strains 1 and 4. Many additional vaccines may be needed, depending on local conditions and risk, including Rhodococcus equi (strangles), Botulism, or Potomac Horse Fever.

As a general rule, a horse or pony that has never had a particular vaccination will be given an initial vaccination and then a booster a few weeks later, then normally once a year after that. Animals kept in a public boarding facility, those shipped for breeding and those frequently on the show circuit often require more vaccinations than horses that are not exposed to outside animals and who do not travel.

Some type of veterinary certificate or proof of vaccination is often required for horses to travel or compete, especially when crossing state, provincial, or international boundaries.

In the US, a certificate stating that the horse has a negative "Coggins" test must be in the vehicle carrying the horse when crossing state lines, and is often required for boarding or showing purposes. This certificate, authorized by a veterinarian, certifies that the horse has been tested recently and does not have an incurable disease called equine infectious anemia (EIA).

=== First-aid kit ===
A well-stocked equine (and human) first-aid kit should be kept in a place where it is easily accessed. Any used or out-of-date items should be replaced as soon as possible. However, other than for minor injuries, a veterinarian should be consulted before treating a sick or injured animal.

The basic items any equine first-aid kit should include are:

- Tools & Diagnostic Equipment
  - Rectal thermometer
  - Petroleum jelly (to use as lubrication for thermometer)
  - Stethoscope (for listening to heartbeat, respiration and, in the case of suspected colic, gut sounds) Pulse and respiration can be determined without a stethoscope. Gut sounds can be heard by putting one's ear to the horse's side, but doing so increases the risk of being kicked by the horse.
  - Sharp, clean scissors, reserved for first aid kit only
  - Wire cutters (for freeing a tangled horse) or equivalent such as a fencing tool or lineman's pliers; though these objects are often kept in a well-organized barn, an extra set in a first-aid kit is helpful for major emergencies.
  - Flashlight and extra batteries (for nighttime emergencies or to add a light source in a shadowed area).
  - Twitch, a device for holding the animal still during minor treatment
- Cleaning supplies
  - Clean bucket, reserved for first-aid kit only, for washing out wounds
  - Clean sponge, reserved for first-aid kit only
  - Gauze (for cleaning wounds)
  - Cotton balls or sheet cotton for absorbing liquids, particularly good for dipping into liquid products and then squeezing or dabbing the liquid onto a wound. (Cotton used to clean a wound may leave fibers in the injury; gauze is a better product if the wound must be touched.)
  - Hypodermic syringe (without needle), for cleaning wounds. (Using the syringe to wash out a wound is preferable to cleaning it with cotton or gauze.) An old syringe, if cleaned first, works fine for this.
  - Sterile saline solution, which is used to clean wounds. Contact lens solution may be used for this purpose.
  - Latex/medical gloves, unused
  - Clean towels and rags
  - Disposable rags or paper towels
- Bandages and other forms of protection
  - Absorbent padding, such as roll cotton or a set of cotton leg wraps (keep a clean set sealed in a plastic bag)
  - Gauze to be used as wound dressing underneath bandages
  - Sterile wound dressing, such as telfa pads; large sizes of those intended for humans work well.
  - Leg Bandages – stable bandages or rolls of self-adhering vet wrap
  - Adhesive tape for keeping bandages in place
  - Poultice boot, for hoof injuries. (A hoof boot can be used for this purpose, though a medical boot is usually easier to put on and take off)
- Over-the-counter medications
  - Medical grade antibacterial soap
  - Wound ointment for minor scrapes.
  - Antiseptic/Disinfectant, such as Betadine, diluted iodine solution, or hydrogen peroxide
  - Epsom salts for drawing out infection & treating pain
  - Poultice dressing. Disposable diapers (nappies) or sanitary napkins may also be cut and used as a poultice as they draw moisture out of wounds. Kaolin clay may also be used as a poultice.
- Veterinary medications – in most locations, these are prescription medications and can only be obtained through a licensed Veterinarian. They should generally not be administered without prior consultation with a veterinarian, either over the telephone or by specific advance instruction.
  - Phenylbutazone ("Bute") paste for pain relief
  - Flunixin Meglumine ("Banamine", "Finadyne") granules or paste for colic treatment
  - Acepromazine ("Ace") or similar tranquilizer pill, paste, or pre-filled injector
  - Epinephrine (adrenaline) auto-injectors for emergency treatment of a horse that goes into anaphylactic shock when stung by a bee, wasp or other insect
- Other
  - Veterinarian's and farrier's telephone and emergency numbers.
  - A paper and pencil, for recording symptoms, pulse, respiration and veterinary instructions.
  - A Veterinary Emergency Handbook, giving basic instructions, in the event that a veterinarian cannot be reached immediately.
  - Suitable box/container for all of the above, to keep materials and equipment clean and tidy.

=== Parasite control ===
All equines have a parasite burden, and therefore treatment is periodically needed throughout life. Some steps to reduce parasite infection include regularly removing droppings from the animal's stall, shed or field; breaking up droppings in fields by harrowing or disking; minimizing crowding in fields; periodically leaving a field empty for several weeks; or placing animals other than equines on the field for a period of time, particularly ruminants, which do not host the same species of parasites as equines. If botflies are active, frequent application of fly spray may repel insects. A small pumice stone or specialized bot egg knife can also scrape off any bot eggs that were laid on the hairs of the horse.

Ivermectin is one of the most effective antiparasitics used for horses. It can be used for a wide range of targets including species of the Strongylus nematode. It also is effective against bots. However, having been used heavily for decades, there are concerns that some nematodes are developing resistance.

==== Deworming ====
There are two common methods of deworming. Purge dewormers that kill parasites with a single strong dose, are given periodically, depending on local conditions and veterinary recommendations. Continuous dewormers, also known as "daily" dewormers, are given in the horse's feed each day, in small doses, and kill worms as they infect the horse. Neither of these methods is perfect; purge dewormers are effective for rapidly killing parasites, but are gone from the horses' body in a few days, and then the horse may start to be re-infected. Continuous dewormers are a mild low dose and may be easier on the horse, but may not be effective in quickly killing worms in a heavily-infected horse and may contribute to drug resistance. If a treatment doesn't kill at least 95% of a worm species, that species is classed as 'resistant' to the drug. For adult horses, frequent rotation of several types of dewormers is no longer recommended, as it can often lead to overtreatment and subsequent drug resistance.

Another way of combating drug resistance in adult horses is to deworm less frequently, by performing fecal egg counts on manure and deworming only horses with a high count. This strategy is now recommended by most veterinarians and parasitologists, as it reduces the probability of resistance. For horses that are consistently deemed "low shedders," it is still recommended to deworm at least 1-2 times per year with ivermectin + praziquantel or moxidectin + praziquantel to target tapeworms, bots, and small strongyles. This is typically done in the fall and spring.

Dewormers come in several forms, including pastes, gels, powders, and granules or pellets. Powders and granules normally come in single-dose packaging, and the dewormer is normally mixed in with the horse's feed. Pastes and gels normally come in a plastic syringe which is inserted in the side of the horse's mouth and used to administer the dewormer onto the back of the horse's tongue. A dewormer syringe has a plastic ring on the plunger that is turned to adjust the dosage for the horse's weight.

==== Precautions in deworming ====
Drug resistance is a growing concern for antiparasitic medications. Resistance has been noted with ivermectin to ascarids, and with fenbendazole, oxibendazole, and pyrantel to small strongyles. Development of new drugs takes many years, leading to the concern that worms could out-evolve the drugs currently available to treat them. As a result, most veterinarians now recommend deworming for small strongyles based on fecal egg counts to minimize the development of resistant parasite populations. Fecal egg count reduction tests can also be performed to identify which dewormers are effective on a particular farm.

If a horse is heavily infested with parasites, dewormers must be given carefully. Small strongyles can form cysts embedded in the intestinal epithelium. A decrease in the active population of worms, as in the case of deworming, can cause larvae to emerge from the cysts (larval cyathostomiasis). Additionally, foals with a large load of ivermectin-susceptible ascarids in the small intestine may experience intestinal blockage or rupture after deworming. Thus, in heavily-infested animals, a veterinarian may recommend worming with a mild class of drugs, such as fenbendazole or a low-dose daily wormer for the first month or so, followed by periodic purge wormer treatments.

==== Types of parasites found in equines ====
- Ascarids, also known as roundworms
- Pinworms, sometimes known as seatworms
- Tapeworms
- Strongyles – large and small, sometimes known as Redworm.
- Bots – fly larvae – bot eggs are laid on a horse's coat, and when accidentally ingested through the horse licking its coat, the larvae hatch in the tongue, migrate down the esophagus and mature in the stomach.

Ringworm in horses is not actually a worm but a contagious fungal skin disease and is normally treated using an anti-fungal wash.

There are several different brands of dewormer, using different types of active chemicals – which in turn kill different types of parasites. It is sometimes necessary to use a specific wormer at a certain time of year, depending on the life cycle of the parasites involved. In the past, horse owners rotated dewormers during the year, using different brands or formulations with different active chemicals, to combat drug-resistant parasites. However, this approach does not appear to prevent drug resistance, and many veterinarians now recommend individualized deworming plans dependent upon the horse's age and egg shedding status.

==== Active chemicals found in different wormers ====
Equine Wormer Drugs
Chemical class	Specific chemical	sample brand names
Benzimidazole	Fenbendazole	Panacur, Safe-Guard
Benzimidazole	Mebendazole	Equivurm, Telmin
Benzimidazole	Oxibendazole	Anthelcide EQ
Pyrantels	Pyrantel pamoate	Strongid P, Strongid T, Rotectin 2
Pyrantels	Pyrantel tartrate (daily wormer)	Strongid C, Equi-Aid CW, Pellet-Care P
Macrocyclic Lactones	Ivermectin	Eraquell (UK), Eqvalan (US), Equimectrin (US), Furexel (US), Ivexterm (Mexico), Mectizan (Canada), Rotectin 1 (US), Stromectol (US), Zimecterin (US)
Macrocyclic Lactones	Moxidectin	Quest (US), Quest Plus (US, incl. Praziquantel), ComboCare (US, incl. Praziquantel), Equest and Equest Pramox same as Quest and Quest Plus for EU
Praziquantels	Praziquantel	Cestoved, D-Worm, Droncit, Profender, Tape Worm Tabs

The medications piperazine and thiabendazole are no longer commonly used as equine wormers; they have been replaced by the above drugs.

=== Dental care ===
A horse's teeth grow continuously throughout its life and can develop uneven wear patterns. Most common are sharp edges on the sides of the molars which may cause problems when eating or being ridden. For this reason a horse or pony needs to have its teeth checked by a veterinarian or qualified equine dentist at least once a year. If there are problems, any points, unevenness or rough areas can be ground down with a rasp until they are smooth. This process is known as "floating".

Basic floating can be accomplished by the practitioner pulling the end of horse's tongue out the side of the mouth, having an assistant hold the tongue while the teeth are rasped. The horse will not bite its own tongue, and will often tolerate the floating process if held closely and kept in a confined area where it cannot move. When complex dental work is required or if a horse strenuously objects to the procedure, sedation is used.

A horse can also suffer from an equine malocclusion where there is a misalignment between the upper and lower jaws. This can lead to a number of dental problems.

=== Alternative medicine ===
Folk remedies and assorted "natural" treatments are sometimes used with horses. Many have origins in historical remedies used prior to the development of modern veterinary medicine. Others are adapted from alternative practices used by humans. Only a few treatments have been studied enough to establish efficacy, though in some cases the only existing research is on humans or other animals and their effectiveness in horses is unproven. Other remedies have no scientific basis for their use. A few could be harmful. A number of alternative or "natural" remedies, whether useful or not, contain substances banned in competition and will show up in drug testing.

One group of common alternative treatments are nutraceutical supplements. The most popular of these are joint supplements such as glucosamine, chondroitin, MSM, and hyaluronic acid. Related to joint supplements are various treatments for pain, viewed as alternatives to the common mainstream pain-reducing medications phenylbutazone, and banamine. Another common group of alternative treatments are "calming" supplements alleged to modify horse behavior. Some of these are basic vitamin or electrolyte concoctions, but others contain banned substances.

A significant number of "natural" remedies are prohibited in competition, including but not limited to valerian, kava kava, passionflower, skullcap, chamomile, vervain, leopard’s bane, nightshade, capsaicin, comfrey, devil′s claw, hops, laurel, lavender, red poppy and rawuolfia. Cannabinoids, including CBD, are also banned.

Certain substances used by humans are potentially toxic to horses. One example is garlic, sometimes fed to horses as an insect repellent, but it contains N-propyl disulfide, which in horses can affect their red blood cells and can lead to Heinz body anemia. Another substance sometimes fed to horses is yogurt containing active probiotics, usually in the mistaken belief it is a digestive supplement. However, as horses cannot digest lactose, doing so can actually cause diarrhea.

Examples of folk remedies that are not effective include feeding chewing tobacco or diatomaceous earth to horses as a dewormer. Neither of these has been proven to work in any empirical study. Others include a practice called gingering alleged to make a horse appear more energetic, but any behavioral changes are generally a result of discomfort caused by the treatment.

Sometimes natural remedies are all that is available, particularly in the global south or other isolated remote areas. Examples include horses in certain tropical nations who have sprained tendons or ligaments are treated with rachette (Nopalea cochenillifera), castor bean leaves (Ricinus communis), aloes (Aloe vera) or leaves of wonder of the world (Kalanchoe pinnata). Natural remedies are also used to treat exercise induced pulmonary haemorrhage (EIPH) with lungwort (Pulmonaria officinalis). Other plants used in combination with conventional medications included liquorice (Glycyrrhiza glabra) root, aerial parts of mullein (Verbascum thapsus) or mallow (Althea), and comfrey (Symphytum officinalis) root.

Other alternative treatments used on horses include veterinary chiropractic, acupuncture, massage therapy and similar topical, hands-on treatments analogous to those used on humans. Generally there are few studies available on the effectiveness of these as applied to horses.

== See also ==
- Equine nutrition
- Farrier
- Horse
- Horse hoof
- Riding instructor

== References and further reading ==
- American Association of Equine Practitioners Emergency Care Tips accessed on 29 October 2007
- American Association of Equine Practitioners Immunizations: Protect Your Horse Against Infectious Diseases accessed on 29 October 2007
- American Association of Equine Practitioners Internal Parasites: Strategies for Effective Parasite Control accessed on 29 October 2007
- American Association of Equine Practitioners Leg Bandages - Bandaging Your Horse's Legs accessed on 29 October 2007
- Auty, I. (ed, 1998) The BHS Complete Manual of Stable Management. Buckingham: Kenilworth Press.
- Evans, J. Warren et al. (1990) The Horse Second Edition New York: Freeman ISBN 0-7167-1811-1
- Evans, Walter. (2000) Horses: A Guide To Selection, Care And Enjoyment. Owl Books; 3rd edition. ISBN 0-8050-7251-9, ISBN 978-0-8050-7251-8
- Harris, Susan E. (1991) Grooming To Win: How to Groom, Trim, Braid and Prepare Your Horse for Show Howell Book House; 2 Sub edition. ISBN 0-87605-892-6, ISBN 978-0-87605-892-3
- Hill, Cherry (1997) Horse Handling & Grooming North Adams, MA: Storey Publishing ISBN 0-88266-956-7
- Hill, Cherry. (1995) Horsekeeping on a Small Acreage: Designing and Managing Your Equine Facilities Storey Publishing, LLC; 2nd edition. ISBN 1-58017-535-X, ISBN 978-1-58017-535-7
- O'Beirne-Ranelagh, Elizabeth (2005), Managing Grass for Horses: The Responsible Owner's Guide London, J. A. Allen, ISBN 978-0-85131-856-1
- Price, Steven D. (ed.) (1998) The Whole Horse Catalog rev. ed. New York: Fireside ISBN 0-684-83995-4
- Vogel, C. (1998) Complete Horsecare Manual. London: Dorling Kindersley.
