= Frog (horse anatomy) =

Part of a horse's hoof

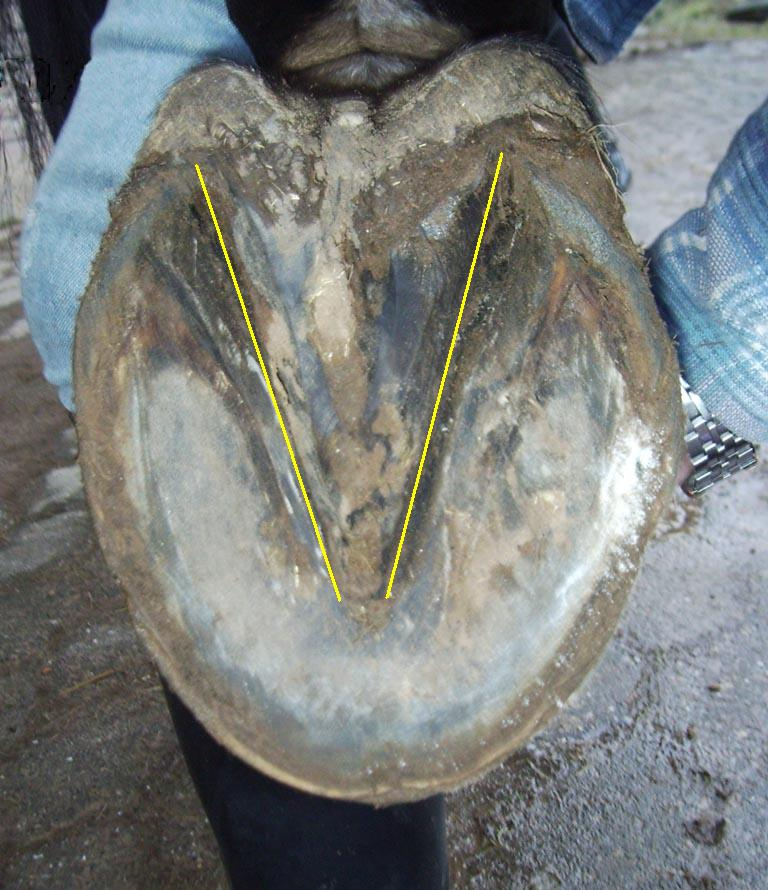
The frog is triangular in shape.

The frog is a part of a horse hoof, located on the underside, which should touch the ground if the horse is standing on soft footing. The frog is triangular in shape, and extends midway from the heels toward the toe, covering around 25% of the bottom of the hoof.

The frog is a V-shaped structure that extends forward across about two-thirds of the sole. Its thickness grows from the front to the back and, at the back, it merges with the heel periople. In its midline, it has a central groove (sulcus) that extends up between the bulbs.

The color of the frog varies between horses and can have no pigment making it cream colored, or with pigment fully or partially giving darker color. Its rubbery consistency suggests a role as a shock absorber and grip tool on hard, smooth ground. The frog also acts like a pump to move the blood back to the heart, a great distance from the relatively thin leg to the main organ of the circulatory system.

In the stabled horse, the frog does not wear but degrades, due to bacterial and fungal activity, to an irregular, soft, slashed surface. In the free-roaming horse, it hardens into a callus consistency with a near-smooth surface. For good health, the horse requires dry areas to stand. If chronically exposed to bacteria, for example standing in manure, the frog will develop an infection called thrush.

The frog is anatomically analogous to the human fingertip.

== Digit remnants ==
A 2018 study on horse foot morphology has suggested that the frog is actually composed of remnants of digits II and IV. This suggests that horses are not truly monodactyl and posits a more complex formation of the horse foot than simple side toe reduction. However, this conclusion was disputed by a later 2023 study, who suggested that the frog was also present in 3-toed equines like hipparionines.

== See also ==
- Circulatory system of the horse
- Equine anatomy
- Farrier
- Horse hoof § sole
