= Thrush (horse) =

Bacterial infection of the hoof

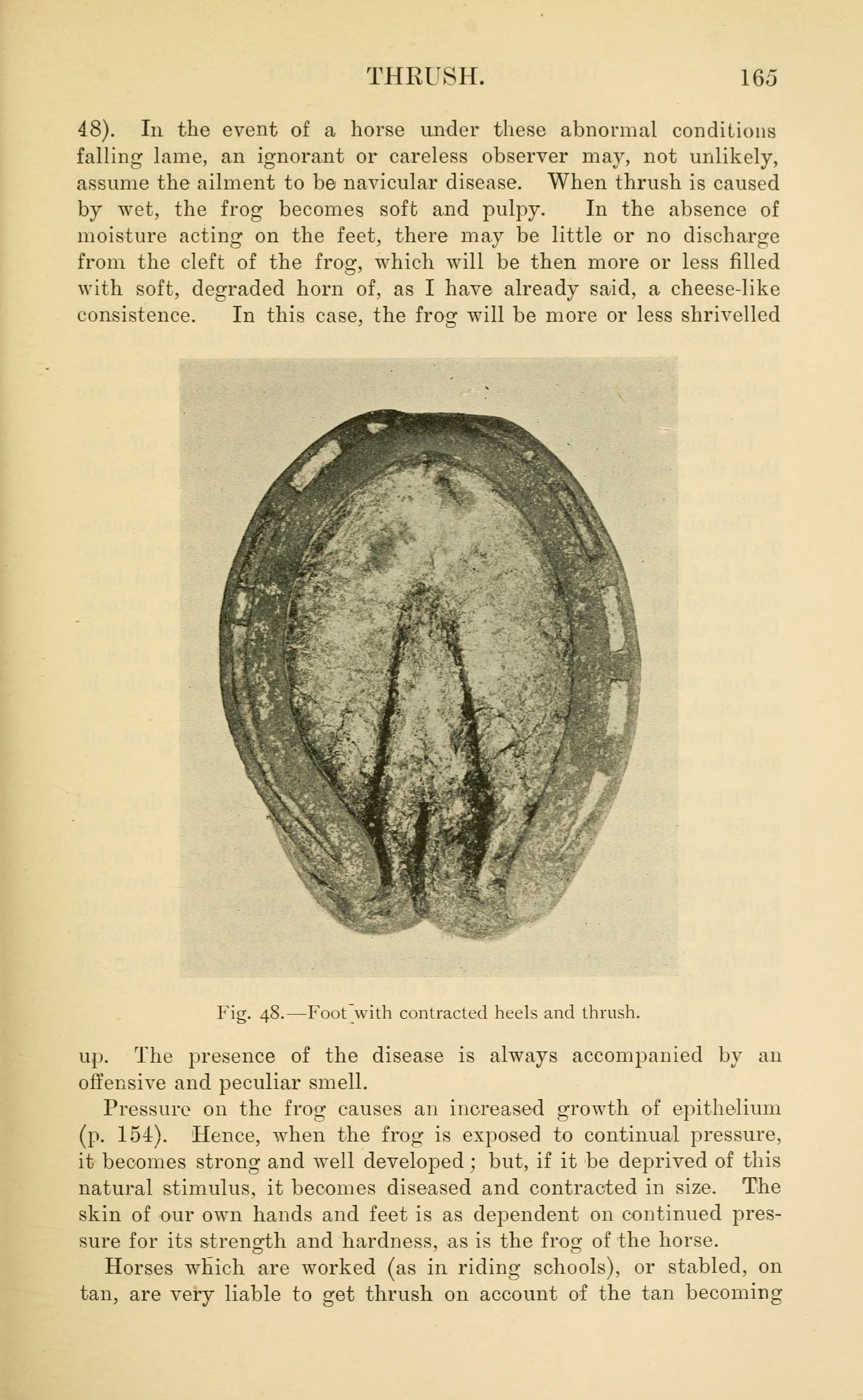
A photo of thrush in a veterinary book published in 1903.

Thrush is a very common bacterial infection that occurs on the hoof of a horse, specifically in the region of the frog. The bacterium involved is Fusobacterium necrophorum, and occurs naturally in the animal's environment—especially in wet, muddy, or unsanitary conditions, such as an unclean stall—and grows best with low oxygen. Horses with deep clefts, or narrow or contracted heels, are more at risk of developing thrush. The word thrush is the same term as used for oral candidiasis.

== Symptoms ==
The most obvious sign of thrush is usually the odor that occurs when picking out the feet. Additionally, the infected areas of the hoof will be black in color (even on a dark-horned hoof), and will easily break or crumble when scraped with a hoof pick. When picking the hooves around thrush areas, the differences between healthy and infected areas can be seen when white or gray tissue (healthy frog) is surrounding a dark, smelly (infected) area.

Most horses do not become lame if infected with thrush. However, if left untreated, the bacteria may migrate deeper into the sensitive parts of the hoof, which will result in lameness. Then, the horse may also react when its feet are picked out, and blood may be seen.

== Treatment and prevention ==
Treatment for horses with thrush includes twice-daily picking of the feet, taking special care to clean out the two collateral grooves and the central sulcus. The feet may then be scrubbed clean using a detergent or disinfectant and warm water, before the frog is coated with a commercial thrush-treatment product, or with iodine solution, which may be soaked into cotton balls and packed into the clefts. Several home remedies are used, such as a hoof packing of a combination of sugar and betadine, powdered aspirin, borax, or diluted bleach. It is best, however, to speak with the horse's veterinarian, to be sure these home remedies are effective and, more importantly, safe for use on horses.

Horses with thrush, or those at risk for contracting it, are best kept in a dry, clean environment, and exposure to manure limited. Daily cleaning of the hooves also contributes to the prevention of thrush. In general, thrush is relatively easy to treat, although it can easily return and it can take up to a year for a fully healthy frog to regrow after a severe infection, in particular the central sulcus.
