= Chestnut (disambiguation) =

Chestnut is the Castanea genus of trees and shrubs, and the nut they produce.

Chestnut may also refer to:

== Arts and entertainment ==
- Chestnut (dance), an English country dance
- Chestnut (film), a 2023 American drama
- Chestnut (joke), British slang for an old or stale joke, or a piece of music that has gone stale
- "Chestnut" (Westworld), a 2016 TV episode
- Chestnut: Hero of Central Park, a 2004 family film

== Places in the United States ==
- Chestnut, Illinois
- Chestnut, Louisiana
- Chestnut Creek, Virginia
- Chestnut Hill, Massachusetts
- Chestnut Hill, Philadelphia, Pennsylvania
- Chestnut Township, Knox County, Illinois

== Other uses ==
- Chestnut (color), reddish brown
- Chestnut hair, reddish brown hair
- Chestnut (horse color)
- Chestnut (horse anatomy), a natural callus on the legs of horses
- Chestnut (surname), including a list of people with the name
- Chestnut Canoe Company, a Canadian company that closed in 1979
- Operation Chestnut, a failed British Second World War raid
- USS Chestnut, a World War II ship
- Chestnut or Conistra vaccinii, a moth

== See also ==
- Chesnut, a surname
- Chesnutt, a surname
- Chess-Nuts, a 1932 animated short film
- Chestnut dunnart, a marsupial
- Chestnut Hall, Philadelphia, Pennsylvania, U.S., formerly the Pennsylvania Hotel
- Chestnut Hill (disambiguation)
- Chestnut Lodge, a historic building in Rockville, Maryland, U.S.
- Chestnut Mountain (disambiguation)
- Chestnut mushroom, a fungus
- Chestnut oak, Quercus montana
- Chestnut Residence, at University of Toronto, Canada
- Chestnut Ridge (disambiguation)
- Chestnut sparrow, a bird
- Chestnut Street (disambiguation)
- Chestnut teal, a duck
- Chestnut woodpecker, a bird
- Horse chestnut, genus Aesculus
- Pachira aquatica, or Malabar chestnut, Guiana chestnut
- Swamp chestnut oak, Quercus michauxii
- Tahitian chestnut or Polynesian chestnut, Inocarpus fagifer
- Water chestnut (disambiguation)
