= Chestnut (surname) =

Chestnut is a surname. Notable people with the surname include:

- Ashlei Sharpe Chestnut, American actress
- Ben Chestnut, American billionaire businessman
- Charles S. Chestnut IV (born 1962), American politician
- Cynthia Chestnut (born 1949), American politician
- Cyrus Chestnut (born 1963), American jazz pianist, composer and producer
- Duce Chestnut (born 2002), American football player
- Harold Chestnut (1917–2001), American electrical and control engineer
- J. L. Chestnut Jr. (1930–2008), American attorney and civil rights activist
- Jacob Chestnut (1940–1998), American police officer
- Jennings Chestnut, American luthier
- Joey Chestnut (born 1983), American competitive eater
- Julius Chestnut (born 2000), American football player
- Morris Chestnut (born 1969), American actor
- Randy Chestnut (born 1971), American comedian
- Johnson Chesnut Whittaker (1858–1931), American soldier

== See also ==
- Chesnut (surname)
- Chesnutt
