= Horse chestnut (disambiguation) =

Horse chestnut may refer to:

- Aesculus hippocastanum, a species of large deciduous tree native to Europe and planted around the world as an ornamental tree
- Aesculus glabra, a species of medium-sized deciduous tree also called Ohio buckeye native to the continental US and Canada
- Aesculus californica, California horse-chestnut or California buckeye, a species of large deciduous shrub or small tree
  - Species of the genus Aesculus
- Horse Chestnut (horse), a South African Thoroughbred racehorse
- Chestnut (coat), a common coat color in horses
- Chestnut (horse anatomy), the callus on the leg of a horse

== See also ==
- Horse-chestnut leaf miner, a moth of the lepidopteran family Gracillariidae
- Chestnut (disambiguation)
