= Théo Mahy =

Film director

Théo Mahy-Ma-Somga (born November 18, 1989, Paris, France), better known as Théo Mahy, is an independent film director, producer, and screenwriter. His production company, L'Atelier Productions, is based in Los Angeles. His international background serves as inspiration for his filmmaking as he often uses his experiences as a descendant of immigrants as well as his French background to make social commentary on modern day society. He is most well known for his film projects An American Life, Awakened, The Audience starring Ashlei Sharpe Chestnut, and All We have Left starring Dree Hemingway.

== Filmography ==
=== Film ===
Year	Title	Role
2003-2004	Lost in Reality	Director
2018	Fashionables	Producer
2019	The Audience	Director, Producer, Screenwriter
2019	Awakened	Director, Producer, Screenwriter
2020	An American Life	Director, Producer, Screenwriter
2020	All We Have Left	Director, Producer, Screenwriter

=== Television ===
Year	Title	Role
2017-2018	Actions to Withstand	Director, Producer
2018	Discounted Masterclass	Producer
2018	Below the fold (TV Miniseries)	Producer

== Featuring film festivals and accolades ==
=== Film festivals and accolades ===
Year	Film Festival	Film	Category	Result
2019	Chelsea Film Festival	An American Life	Best Short Film	Nominated
2019	Williamsburg Independent Film Festival	An American Life	Best Short Film	Nominated
2019	Lisbon Film Rendezvous	An American Life	Short Film	Nominated
2020	Cyrus International Film Festival of Toronto	The Audience	Short Film	Nominated
2020	Barcelona International Film Festival	The Audience	Short Film	Nominated
2020	Lisbon Film Rendezvous	The Audience	Best Short Film	Nominated
2020	MayDay Film Festival	An American Life	Best Short	Nominated
2020	Melkbos Short Film Festival	An American Life	Short Film	Nominated
2020	Melkbos Short Film Festival	An American Life	Best Director	Nominated
2020	Santa Fe Film Festival	The Audience	Official Selection - Best Short Film	Nominated
