= Caspian horse =

Iranian breed of horse

Caspian
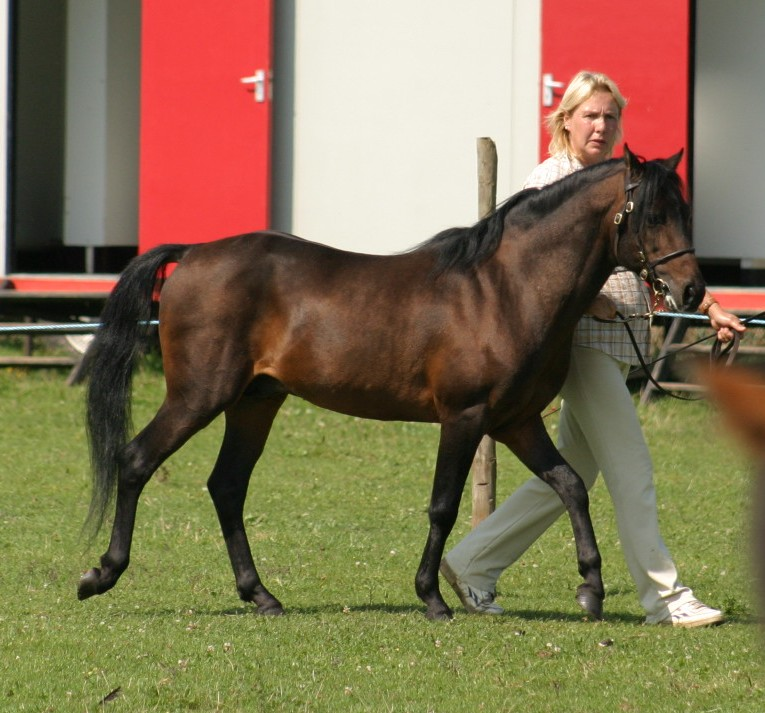
- Caspian stallion named Runnymede Felfel
- Country of origin: Iran

Traits
- Distinguishing features: Small horse breed rediscovered in 1965 from stock believed to be of ancient origins; now bred in several other countries

The Caspian is an Iranian breed of pony or small horse of Oriental type.

The breed was rediscovered in 1965 by an Iranian aristocrat in Tehran, Narcy Firouz, and his American-born wife, Louise Laylin, from a base stock of a small number of small horses found in the Elburz Mountains in Amol. In 2011, the remains of a small horse dating back to 3400 B.C.E. were found at Gohar Tappeh, Iran, giving rise to claims that today's Caspian originates from the oldest known breed of the domestic horse. It is also one of the rarest horse breeds and its population status is critically endangered.

== History ==
The Caspian is said to originate from the mountainous regions of northern Iran, which explains why the breed is tough, athletic, and nimble. Indeed, the oldest known specimen of a Caspian-like horse was found in 2011, in a cemetery dating back to 3400 B.C.E., in the archaeological dig at Gohar Tappeh in the province of Mazandaran in northern Iran, between the cities of Neka and Behshahr. Small horses were depicted in ancient art where they appeared in scenes pulling chariots.

The Persian Empire required land transport on a huge scale. The Persians were the first people to breed horses especially for strength and speed. That these horses were very small by modern standards is shown by a miniature golden chariot, a toy or perhaps a votive offering, found in the so-called Oxus Treasure, discovered in the extreme east of the empire but apparently made in central Persia. The vehicle was obviously built for speed. Its wheels are taller than the horses, which are themselves of lesser height than the two passengers – and not because of the status of the passengers. Neil MacGregor likens this vehicle to a Ferrari or Porsche amongst cars – fast and luxurious. King Darius (the Great) trusted his life to the little horses during lion hunts, and honored them on his famous Trilingual Seal.

As seen on the bas comfortes on the great staircase at Persepolis, the Persian Shah demanded tributes of only first class animals.

== Characteristics ==
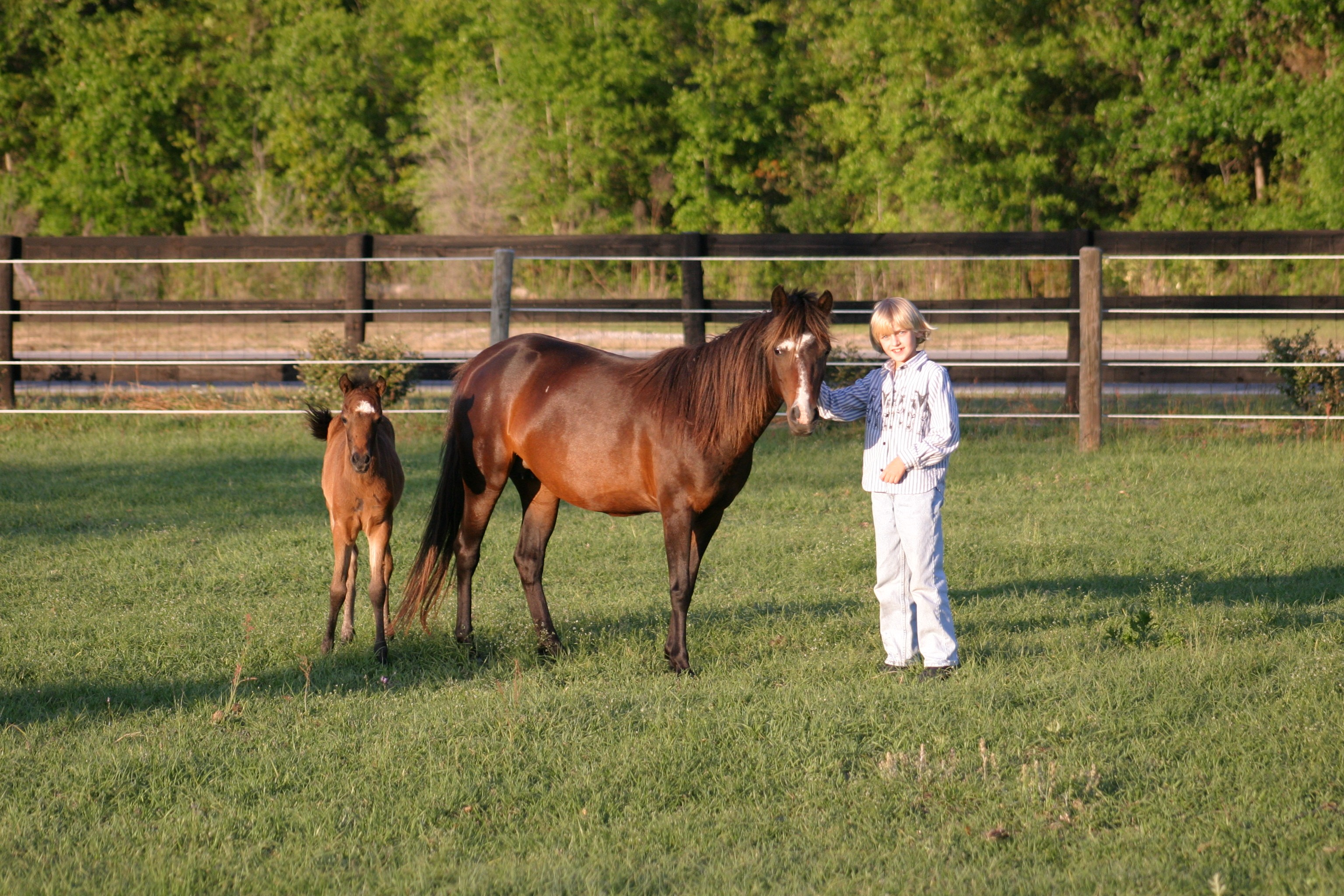
Caspians are gentle and sweet with children.

The Caspian generally stands about 120 cm (11.3 h) at the withers. It has concave profile and a vaulted forehead; the back is straight and short, the croup level and the tail is set on high.

The Caspian Horse is extremely hardy, with strong hooves that rarely need shoeing unless they are consistently worked on very hard or stony ground. Their base coat colors are bay, chestnut, and black and other color modifiers include grey and dun. White markings may appear on the head and legs, but minimal white or no white markings are usually favored. Some lack chestnuts or ergots.

=== Genetics and phenotype ===
There are experts who classify the Caspian horse as one that does not directly fall into the four ancestral types, namely the Northern European, Northern Steppe, Southern Steppe, and the Iberian/Mediterranean, making it unique and an important link to ancient horses. It is this reason the Caspian is considered to be one of the rarest breeds of horses, along with the Akhal Teke.

Research has shown that Caspian and Turkoman horses occupy positions in phylogenetic analysis that has given rise to a hypothesis that they carry genetics that are ancestral to all other oriental type breeds studied to date.

== See also ==
- Lazarus taxon
- Przewalski's horse
