= Water chestnut =

Water chestnut may refer to either of two plants, both used in Chinese cuisine:

- Eleocharis dulcis, or Chinese water chestnut, is eaten for its crisp corm
- Water caltrop, Trapa natans and Trapa bicornis, is eaten for its starchy seed

== See also ==
- Chinese cuisine
- Chinese chestnut
- Chestnut (disambiguation)
