= Chesnut =

Chesnut is a surname. Notable people with the surname include:

- Eleanor Chesnut (1868–1905), American Christian missionary
- James Chesnut Jr. (1815–1885), American planter, lawyer, politician and general
- Jerry Chesnut (1931–2018), American songwriter
- Mary Boykin Chesnut (1823–1886), American author from South Carolina
- Victor King Chesnut (1867–1938), American botanist and chemist
- William Calvin Chesnut (1873–1962), American judge

== See also ==
- Chesnutt
- Chestnut (surname)
