= Ed Jennings =

American politician

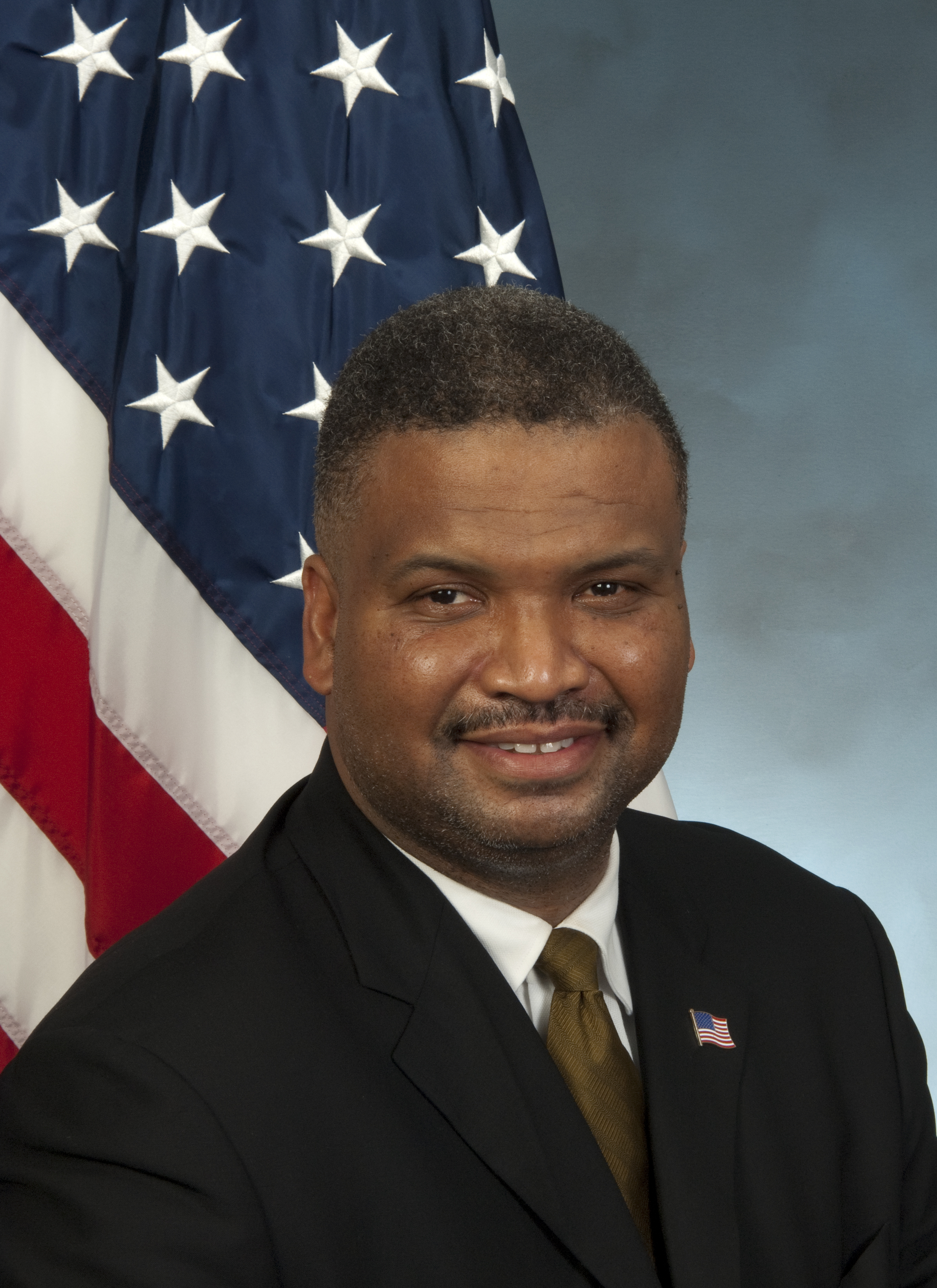

Member of the Florida House of Representatives from the 23rd district
- In office November 7, 2000 – November 7, 2006
- Preceded by: Cynthia Chestnut
- Succeeded by: Chuck Chestnut

Personal details
- Born: July 25, 1968 (age 58) Gainesville, Florida
- Party: Democratic
- Education: University of Florida (B.A.)
- Occupation: Real estate development

Edward L. "Ed" Jennings Jr. is a Democratic politician who served as a member of the Florida House of Representatives from 2000 to 2006, representing the 23rd District. After unsuccessfully running for the Florida Senate in 2006, Jennings was appointed as the Regional Director for the United States Department of Housing and Urban Development.

== History ==
Jennings was born in Gainesville and attended the University of Florida, where he served as the president of Florida Blue Key and the Black Student Union. Jennings graduated in 1993 with a bachelor's degree in political science, and helped his father, Edward Jennings Sr. get elected to the Gainesville City Commission that year.

== Florida House of Representatives ==
Following incumbent State Representative Cynthia Chestnut's inability to seek re-election, Jennings ran to succeed her in the 23rd District, which stretched from Gainesville to Ocala. He faced Harvey Budd, a former Alachua County Charter Review Commissioner and a member of the Gainesville Plan Board, in the Democratic primary. While both Budd and Jennings agreed in their opposition to Governor Jeb Bush's education policies and in their support of the University of Florida, Jennings campaigned on his support for increased economic development in the poorer, eastern parts of Gainesville and on creating a "Florida Triangle" between Gainesville, Ocala, and Jacksonville. Budd attacked Jennings for working as a real estate developer and for taking contributions from developers, but Jennings argued that he was an environmentally conscientious developer and had relevant experience. Ultimately, Jennings defeated Budd by a wide margin, winning 60–40%. In the general election, Jennings faced Dick Williams, a registered Democrat running as a No Party Affiliation candidate who served as the president of the local chapter of the AARP. Jennings continued to campaign on his proposal to reduce poverty by making investments in the area's infrastructure, and noted that his development company had built low-cost housing units in the eastern part of the district. Jennings beat Williams by a wide margin, receiving 76% of the vote to Williams's 24%, and won his first term in the House.

In his 2002 and 2004 re-elections, Jennings faced only opposition from Libertarian candidates, and defeated both easily. He was opposed by Libertarian Brooks Nelson, a chemical analyst and the son of Dunedin Mayor Janet Henderson, who raised no money and didn't extensively campaign for the seat. Jennings and Nelson strongly disagreed on the issues, with Jennings staking out positions in support of affirmative action and protecting the state's social safety net and Nelson arguing against affirmative action and for broad tax cuts to shrink the size of government. Jennings won easily, defeating Nelson 78–22%, a slight improvement from his 2000 election. Similarly, in 2004, Jennings was opposed by Libertarian nominee Ray Roberts, and won a third and final term, 81–19%.

== 2006 State Senate campaign ==
In 2006, rather than run for a fourth term to the State House, Jennings announced that he would run for the State Senate, seeking to replace incumbent Senator Rod Smith, who was retiring to run for Governor. In the Democratic primary, Jennings faced former State Representative Perry McGriff. Jennings campaigned on his experience and pro-family record in the legislature, his plan to provide health insurance to the uninsured through a private-public partnership, and his opposition to abortion restrictions. Ultimately, Jennings defeated McGriff by a fairly comfortable margin, prevailing 56–44%. Jennings carried Alachua County and Marion County by wide margins, narrowly won Columbia County and Putnam County, while narrowly losing the remaining rural counties to McGriff.

In the general election, Jennings faced Alachua County Sheriff Steve Oelrich. Jennings campaigned on increasing the regulations on insurance companies to prevent property owners from losing coverage, adding trade and technical programs to schools, protecting the "limited essential services" provided by local governments, and increasing funding to education. The campaign quickly became negative, however, with Oelrich attacking Jennings's lack of legislative accomplishments, his support for "social programs and government intervention," for supporting voting rights restoration for ex-felons. and for being delinquent in his property taxes. The race remained close until Election Day, with both Jennings and Oelrich saturating the district with television advertisements and mailers. Despite the district's Democratic lean, however, Oelrich ended up beating Jennings, winning 54–46%.

== Department of Housing and Urban Development ==
In 2010, Jennings was appointed to serve as the Regional Director of Region IV at the Department of Housing and Urban Development, overseeing Alabama, Florida, Georgia, Kentucky, Mississippi, North Carolina, South Carolina, Tennessee, Puerto Rico, and the U.S. Virgin Islands. Then-HUD Secretary Shaun Donovan said, "Today, we need to have people on our senior management team who have the experience to get the job done and I have no doubt, Ed Jennings is just such a person. The eight states that make up our Southeast Region will benefit enormously from his experience and I’m proud he’s answered the call to serve."

While serving at HUD, Jennings was named as a defendant brought by a bank over an unpaid loan, and reached a confidential settlement. The next year, Jennings came under fire for failing to adequately inspect an apartment complex and for unsanitary conditions experienced by a tenant at one of his properties.
