= Chestnut Street =

Chestnut Street may refer to:

== Places ==
- Chestnut Street, Kent, England
- Chestnut Street (Philadelphia), Pennsylvania, U.S.
- Chestnut Street (St. Louis), Missouri, U.S.
- Chestnut Street (Carlin, Nevada), U.S., former US 40
- Chestnut Street District, an historic district in Salem, Massachusetts, U.S.
- Chestnut Street station (BMT Fulton Street Line), formerly in Brooklyn, New York City, U.S.
- Baltimore & Ohio Railroad station (Philadelphia), U.S., or Chestnut Street station

== Other uses ==
- Chestnut Street (book), a 2014 short story collection by Maeve Binchy

== See also ==
- Chestnut (disambiguation)
- Chestnut Street Bridge (Philadelphia), U.S.
- Chestnut Street Incident, an album by Johnny Cougar
