= Cynthia Chestnut =

American politician

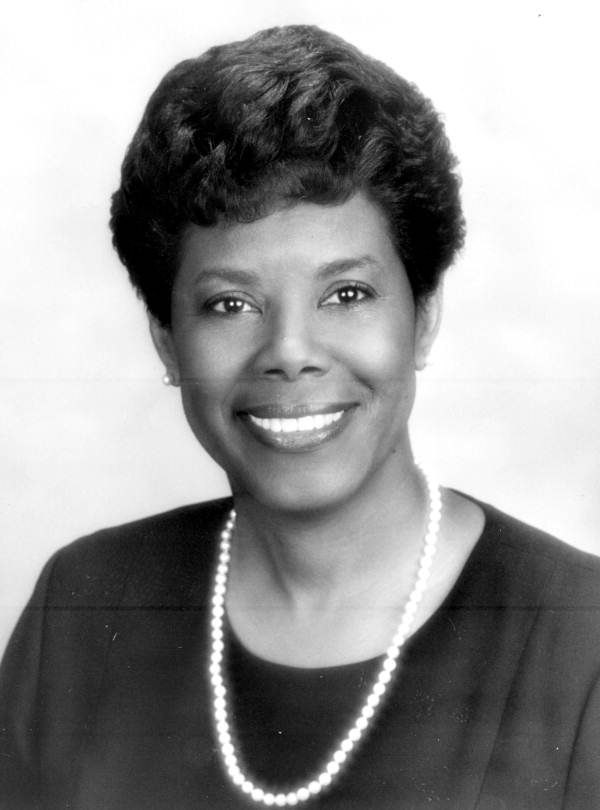

Member of the Florida House of Representatives from the 23rd district
- In office November 6, 1990 – November 7, 2000
- Preceded by: Sidney Martin
- Succeeded by: Ed Jennings

Mayor of Gainesville, Florida
- In office 1989–1990
- Preceded by: David Coffey
- Succeeded by: Courtland A. Collier

City Commissioner from Gainesville, Florida
- In office 1987–1989
- Incumbent
- Assumed office February 2022
- Constituency: At-Large, Seat B

Personal details
- Born: Tallahassee, Florida
- Party: Democratic
- Education: Florida A&M University (B.S.); Florida State University (M.S.); Nova Southeastern University (D.P.A.)
- Occupation: Politician

Cynthia Moore Chestnut is an American Democratic politician who currently serves the Gainesville, Florida City Commission. She previously served on the same City Commission from 1987 to 1989 and as a member of the Florida House of Representatives from 1990 to 2000, representing the 23rd District. After unsuccessfully running for the Florida Senate in 2000, Chestnut was elected to the Alachua County Commission in 2002, where she served until she lost re-election in 2010.

== History ==
Chestnut was born in Tallahassee and attended Florida A&M University, receiving her bachelor's degree in speech pathology in 1970, and Florida State University, receiving her master's degree in speech pathology in 1971. She later attended Nova Southeastern University graduating with a doctorate in public administration in 1981. Chestnut became the first black woman to be elected to the Gainesville City Commission when she won in 1987. When she was appointed mayor in 1989 by the commission, she became the first black woman to serve as Mayor.

She is currently a Commissioner for the City of Gainesville, and is serving as Mayor Pro Tempore.

== Florida House of Representatives ==
In 1990, incumbent State Representative Sid Martin opted against seeking re-election, and Chestnut ran to succeed him in the 23rd District, which included parts of Alachua County and Putnam County. Chestnut faced attorney Clay Phillips and insurance salesman Larry Harvey in the Democratic primary. Though Chestnut placed first in the primary, winning 47% of the vote to Phillips's 41% and Harvey's 12%, because none of them received a majority, a runoff election was held the next month. In the runoff election, Phillips handily outspent Chestnut and won endorsements from retiring State Representative Sid Martin, business groups, and the Florida Police Benevolent Association, while Chestnut was endorsed by teachers and nurses unions. Despite the closeness of the race in the initial primary, Chestnut beat Phillips by a margin of 57–43% in the runoff. In the general election, Chestnut faced Republican nominee Sinclair Eaton, who had run for the seat previously in 1986 and 1988. Chestnut campaigned on her experience on the City Commission and emphasized her support for public education. Chestnut defeated Eaton by a wide margin, winning 59% of the vote to his 41%. Though Eaton narrowly carried the Putnam County portion of the district, Chestnut carried the much larger Alachua County portion in a landslide.

In 1992, Chestnut's district was reconfigured following redistricting (it dropped the Putnam County portions and reached into Ocala in Marion County). Although there was a district change, Chestnut won re-election unopposed that year. During her second term in the legislature, Chestnut served as the chairwoman of the House Education Committee, and used her chairmanship to require Florida schools to teach African-American history and to educate students about the Holocaust. Glass launched an aggressive, abusive campaign against Chestnut, calling her a "whore" who was "bought and paid for by the PACs" and advocating for the "violent overthrow of the government if things don't change." Chestnut overwhelmingly defeated Glass, winning 71% of the vote to his 29%, and winning substantial margins in both Alachua and Marion Counties. She faced Glass again in 1996, beating him by an even slightly larger margin of 72–28% to win her fourth term. In 1998, Chestnut won her fifth and final term in the House unopposed.

== 2000 State Senate campaign ==
In 2000, State Senator George Kirkpatrick was unable to seek re-election due to term limits. Chestnut ran to succeed him in the 5th District, which included parts of Alachua County, Bradford County, Clay County, Columbia County, Levy County, Marion County, Putnam County, Suwannee County, and Union County. She faced State Attorney Rod Smith in the Democratic primary. Chestnut focused her campaign on education, arguing that she would conduct a full review of the Florida educational system, from kindergarten to the graduate school level, if elected. Smith attacked Chestnut for supporting the establishment of the Florida International University College of Law and the re-establishment of Florida A&M's law school, which he argued would take funding away from other law schools in the state, like the law school at the University of Florida. Ultimately, Smith's local popularity in the district, driven by his successful prosecution of serial killer Danny Rolling and his support from the district's more conservative areas, proved insurmountable for Chestnut. She wound up losing to Smith by a wide margin, winning just 38% of the vote to Smith's 62%, and lost every county in the district except for the narrow Marion County portion that overlapped with her legislative district.

== Alachua County Commission ==
In 2002, Chestnut re-entered public life by announcing that she would challenge Alachua County Commissioner Robert Hutchinson, who represented District 4, in the Democratic primary. Chestnut campaigned on her legislative and municipal experience, and focused on reducing the county's poverty rate, reorganizing the county budget, developing a closer relationship with the University of Florida to increase employment opportunities, and building a bridge between the business community and environmentalists. The Gainesville Sun, though effusive in its "enormous regard for Chestnut," endorsed Hutchinson, concluding that Chestnut "simply hasn't made the case for turning out an incumbent county commissioner who has a solid record of accomplishment to recommend him." Chestnut ended up narrowly defeating Hutchinson, winning 54% of the vote to his 46%. She advanced to the general election, where she faced Republican nominee Don Marsh and Libertarian nominee Darrell McCormick. Chestnut again focused on her support for reducing poverty and argued that public transportation needed to be more present and reliable in the poorer, eastern part of the county. Chestnut ended up winning her first term on the County Commission by a wide margin, winning 58% of the vote to Marsh's 34% and McCormick's 8%, becoming the first black woman elected to the County Commission. In 2006, Chestnut ran for re-election against Lloyd Bailey, a dive shop owner and the Republican nominee for the race. Chestnut expanded her margin of victory even more, defeating Bailey by a wide 62-38% margin.

In 2004, Chestnut was found guilty of an ethics violation from the Florida Commission on Ethics when she took free tickets to an event from developer Clarke Butler of Butler Plaza.

In 2010, Chestnut ran for a third term on the County Commission and was opposed by Republican nominee Susan Baird, a Tea Party activist and a real estate broker. Baird argued that the county's expenditures needed to be slashed, while Chestnut argued for efficiency in government services and increased public-private partnerships. Despite Alachua County leaning Democratic, including Democratic gubernatorial nominee Alex Sink's strong performance in the county, Chestnut lost re-election in a major upset to Baird, winning just 46% of the vote to Baird's 54%, making Baird the first Republican to be elected to the County Commission in nearly three decades.

== Later involvement ==
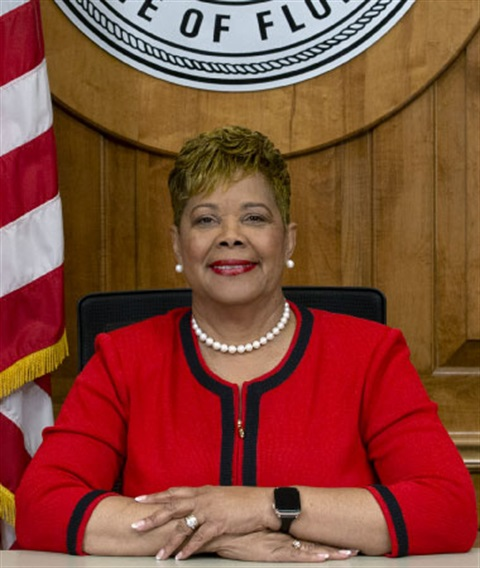
Official portrait, c. 2022

In 2012, Chestnut's stepson, Chuck Chestnut (who also served in the state House) was elected to the Alachua County Commission. Cynthia Chestnut was elected as the chairwoman of the Alachua County Democratic Party in 2014. Chestnut ran for Florida Democratic Party chair in 2021.

On January 25, 2022, Chestnut was once again elected to the Gainesville, Florida City Commission in a special election after narrowly defeating opponent Matt Howland in a runoff election. On February 17, 2022 Chestnut was sworn in to the same office she had held more than 30 years before. Among her initial areas of focus, Chestnut advocated for potentially bringing a new multi-use complex to East Gainesville.

== See also ==
- List of first African-American mayors
