= Chestnut (dance) =

English country dance

Classification
- Genre: English country dance
- Formation: 3 couples in a line
- Meter: 2/2
- Key: A minor

Choreography
- Choreographer: John Playford
- Year: 1651

Chestnut (or Dove's Figary) is an English country dance from The Dancing Master collection.

== Dance ==
English country dance for three couples in a line, recorded by John Playford, 1651.

== Instructions ==
reconstructed by Delbert von Straßburg and Stephen Fischer

Bar	Figure
1 - 4	Lead up a double and back,
5 - 8	That again
1 - 2	Turn to face partner, the double back away from them.
3 - 4	Double forwards towards your partner, taking both hands and changing into their place
5 - 8	Men join hands and circle halfway around, so that the top man ends up in the bottom man's place, and vice versa. At the same time the ladies take hands and do the same
9 - 16	Repeat 1 - 8 (everyone ends up back in their place)
1 - 4	Arm left, arm right with partner
1 - 4	Double forwards and back, changing places
4 - 8	The men make half a hey, so that the top man ends up in the bottom man's place, and vice versa. At the same time the ladies do the same.
9 - 16	Repeat 1 - 8 (everyone ends up back in their place)
1 - 4	Side left, side right with partner
1 - 4	Double forwards and back, changing places
5 - 8	The first couple peels down the middle of the set to the bottom, and everyone follows so that the couples are reversed.
9 - 12	Double forwards and back, changing places
13 - 16	The first couple (now at the bottom) casts out and everyone follows (everyone ends up back in their places)
