= Chestnut Hall =

Hotel Pennsylvania
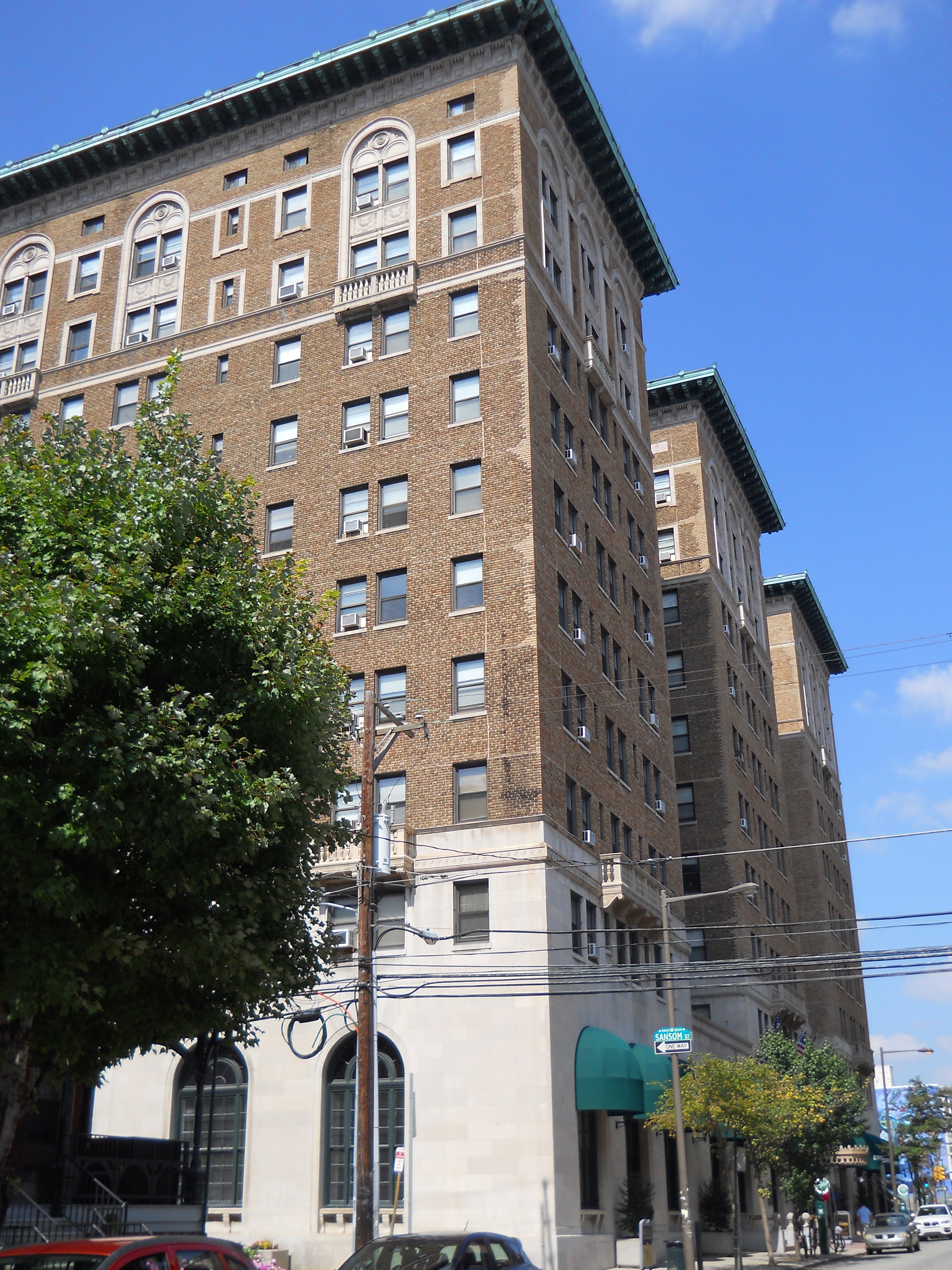
- Pennsylvania Hotel. September 2013.

- Location within Philadelphia Location within Pennsylvania Location within the United States
- 39°57′18″N 75°12′2″W
- Location: 3900 Chestnut St; Philadelphia, PA 19104

History
- Built: 1922

Site notes
- Architect: Clarence Edmond Wunder
- Architectural style: Renaissance Revival
- Hotel Pennsylvania
- U.S. National Register of Historic Places
- NRHP reference No.: 12001097
- Added to NRHP: December 26, 2012

Chestnut Hall, formerly known as Hotel Pennsylvania, is a 10-story building composed of 315 apartments as well as retail space in University City, Philadelphia. It is owned by Apartment Income REIT Corp., which is owned by funds managed by The Blackstone Group. It is primarily occupied by university students.

It is designed in the Renaissance Revival architecture style. The building consists of a steel structure, a cement and brick facade, and an entablature with accompanying cornice along the top.

== History ==
The property was designed by Clarence E. Wunder, and was built in 1922.

The building served as the Hotel Pennsylvania. In the 1940s, it became known as the Hotel Philadelphian.

It was sold to Sheraton Hotels in December 1946, and was renamed the Penn-Sheraton Hotel. Sheraton sold the hotel to Hertfield Hotels in October 1953, and they renamed the Penn-Sheraton very slightly, changing it to the Penn Sherwood Hotel. In 1962, the hotel rejoined Sheraton as a franchise, operating as the Sheraton Motor Inn until 1966. As of 2005, the property was managed by Aimco. In June 2006, Aimco bought a majority stake of the property. In 2020, it was contributed to Apartment Income REIT Corp., which was acquired by funds managed by The Blackstone Group.

== Gallery ==
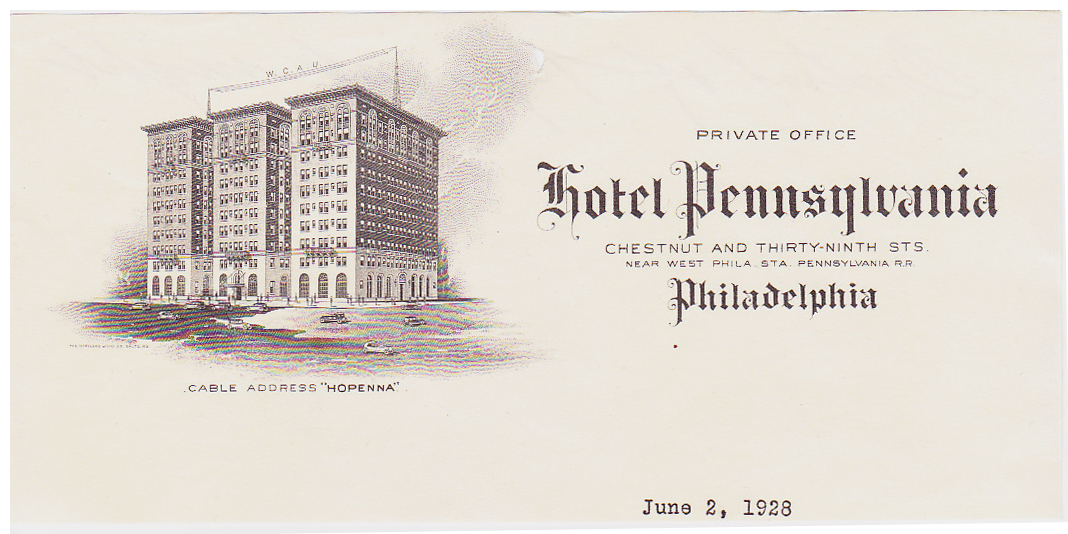
Vintage Hotel Pennsylvania information card.

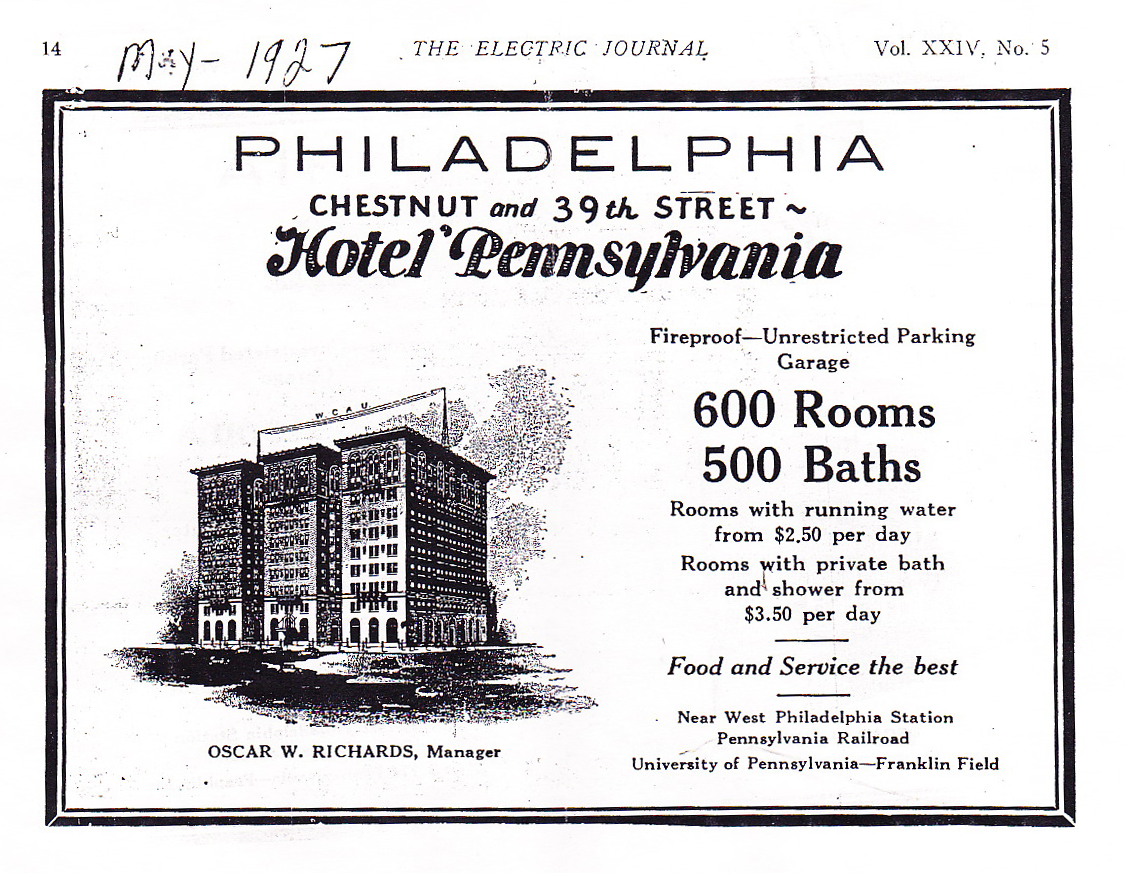
Vintage Hotel Pennsylvania advertisement.

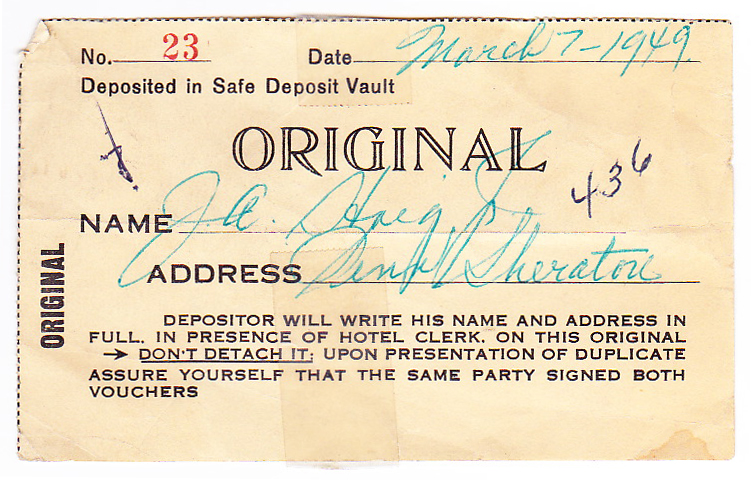
A vintage safe deposit slip from the Hotel Pennsylvania in Philadelphia.

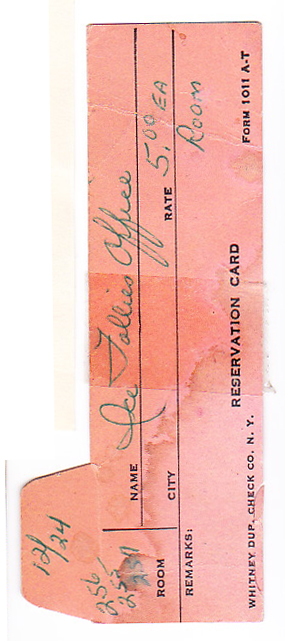
A vintage Penn Sherwood Hotel reservation slip.

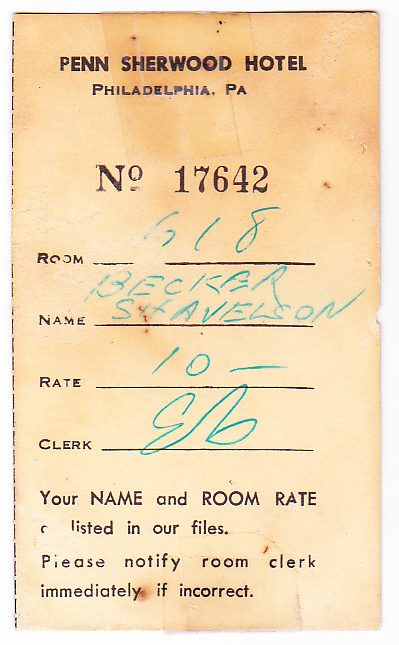
A vintage Penn Sherwood room card.

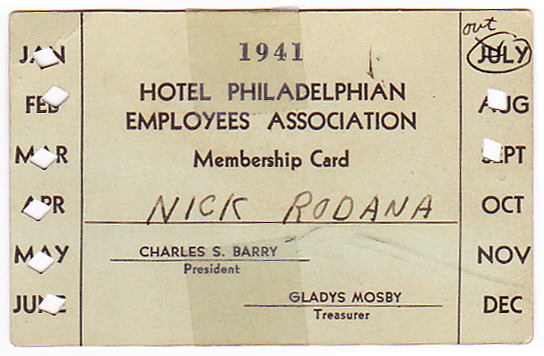
A vintage Hotel Philadelphian Employee card.

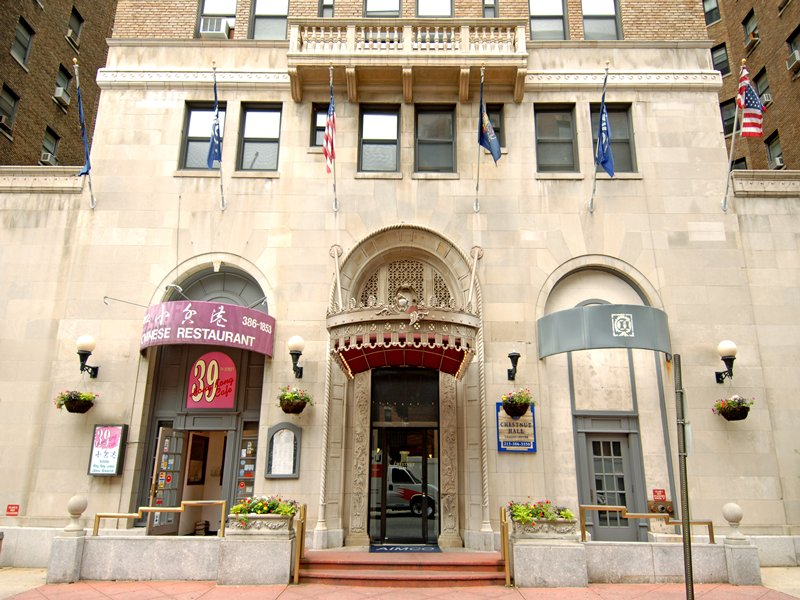
Chestnut Hall's facade and entryway

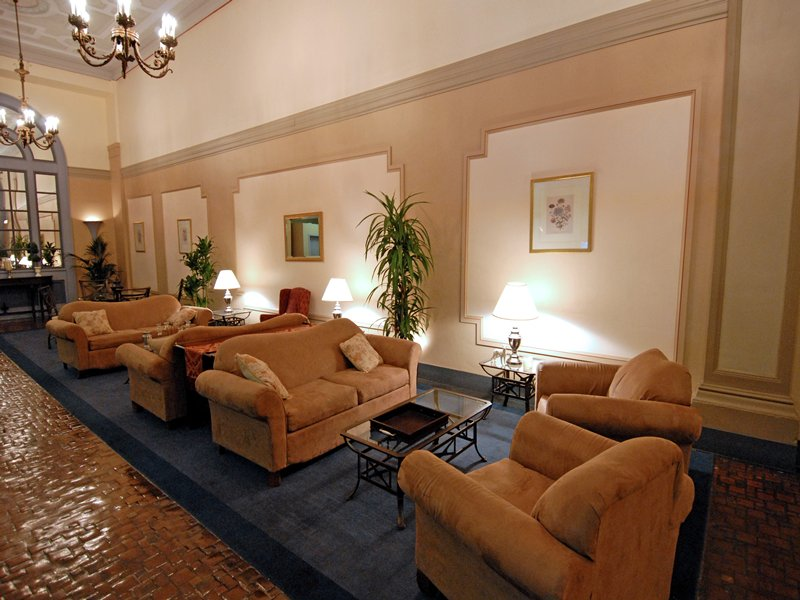
Chestnut Hall's interior hallway
