= Jennings Chestnut =

Jennings Chestnut, born in Conway, South Carolina, was an American luthier, specializing in mandolins.

Despite his lack of formal training, Chestnut's mandolins became popular among bluegrass musicians in and around Conway. He began making mandolins when he could not afford to buy one for his oldest son. Although able to play the banjo and guitar, Chestnut never learned to play the mandolin.

== Career ==
Chestnut resided in Conway for much of his life, with the exception of four years spent in the Army and twenty years spent managing an insurance company in North Carolina. On leaving the insurance business, Chestnut worked as a market stallholder in Myrtle Beach.

In 1968, he noticed Carl Story's band featured a mandolin when they were in Wilmington for a gig. Carl told Chestnut that the instrument had been constructed by C.E. Ward, the banjo player.

Chestnut created his first instrument in 1971, using a friend's mandolin as a model. He used parts from a five-gallon pickle barrel, old pianos and mother-of-pearl buttons in a laundromat's lost and found.

He stopped building mandolins in 1990. Chestnut stated in an interview with Caroline Wright that, "I never wanted to be a manufacturer, and the next three I built were always sold [in advance]." He always screened prospective owners of his instruments.

== Projects ==
=== Bluegrass on the Waccamaw ===
Chestnut founded the Bluegrass on the Waccamaw festival, which held its first event in 1997. It was family-oriented, featured eight bands, and was free to the public. Many of the acts that Chestnut scheduled for his other shows, such as the Premiere Bluegrass Weekend also performed at Bluegrass on the Waccamaw.

=== Chestnut Mandolins ===
Chestnut opened Chestnut Mandolins in 1985, selling acoustic and electric guitars, mandolins, banjos and other instruments.

=== Premiere Bluegrass Weekend ===
Premiere Bluegrass Weekend is held at Ocean Lakes Campground in Myrtle Beach, SC every year towards the end of the summer.

== Death ==
Chestnut died of an inoperable brain tumor at 7:30 a.m. on February 14, 2010. A benefit concert had been scheduled for February 21, 2010, to raise funds for medical expenses; it went on as planned, raising money for Chestnut's wife, Willie Chestnut, and acting as a memorial service.
