= Leuckart's law =

Leuckart's law is an empirical law in zoology that states that the size of the eye of an animal is related to its maximum speed of movement; fast-moving animals have larger eyes, after allowing for the effects of body mass. The hypothesis dates from 1876, and in older literature is usually referred to as Leuckart's ratio. It was proposed by Rudolf Leuckart in 1876.

The principle was initially applied to birds; it has also been applied to mammals.

== Criticism ==
A study of 88 bird species, published in 2011, found no useful correlation between flight speed and eye size.
