= Charles S. Chestnut IV =

American politician (born 1962)

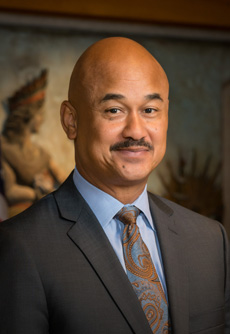

Alachua County Commissioner, District 5
- Incumbent
- Assumed office November 20, 2012
- Preceded by: Winston J. Bradley

Member of the Florida House of Representatives from the 23rd district
- In office November 21, 2006 – November 20, 2012
- Preceded by: Edward L. Jennings
- Succeeded by: Dennis K. Baxley

Personal details
- Born: July 27, 1962 (age 64) Gainesville, Florida
- Party: Democratic
- Spouse: Tiffany Watts-Chestnut
- Children: Ashlei,; Charlie
- Education: Miami-Dade Community College (A.S.); Bethune-Cookman College (B.S.)
- Profession: Funeral director

Charles S. "Chuck" Chestnut IV (born July 27, 1962) is a Democratic politician who currently serves as an Alachua County Commissioner, representing the 5th District from 2012 to the present. Prior to being elected to the Alachua County Commission, Chestnut served as a member of the Florida House of Representatives from 2006 to 2012, representing the 96th District.

== Early life ==
Charles S. Chestnut IV was born in Gainesville, Florida to Charles S. Chestnut III and is the step-son of Cynthia Chestnut. Chestnut attended Bethune-Cookman College, receiving a degree in business administration, and then Miami-Dade Community College, graduating with a degree in mortuary science. He returned to Gainesville and started working for his family's business, Chestnut Funeral Home.

== Gainesville City Commission ==
In 2000, Chestnut ran for a seat on the Gainesville City Commission from District 1, and faced Scherwin Henry, Jason Talley, Joel Buchanan, and Davin Woody. Chestnut placed first in the primary election, winning 41% of the vote, but because he did not receive a majority, he ran in a runoff election with the second-place finisher, Henry, who received 23%. Chestnut ended up defeating Henry by a wide margin, winning 57% of the vote. Chestnut was re-elected to a second term without opposition in 2003 and declined to run for a third term in 2006.

== Florida House of Representatives ==
When incumbent State Representative Edward L. Jennings opted to unsuccessfully run for the Florida Senate rather than seek re-election, Chestnut ran to succeed him in the 23rd District, which stretched from Gainesville to Ocala in eastern Alachua County and northwestern Marion County. He faced Alachua Vice Mayor Bonnie Burgess in the Democratic primary, and advocated for giving small businesses tax incentives to create jobs, developing wellness initiatives to cut health care costs, increasing teacher pay, providing affordable housing, and reforming the state's standardized testing system, arguing, "We need to bring excitement back to education, rather than just teaching our kids to a test." He ended up defeating Burgess in a landslide, winning 62% of the vote and moving on to the general election, where he faced Cain Davis, the Republican nominee and the public housing administrator for the Gainesville Housing Authority. During the campaign, Chestnut ran on fighting South Florida for water resources, declaring, "I'm not in favor of sharing our water with South Florida. They should learn to conserve as we do here in this region." Chestnut dispatched Davis easily, winning his first term in the legislature 64% of the vote to his 36%.

Running for re-election in 2008, he was opposed by nonprofit director and Republican nominee Bernie DeCastro, who ran Time for Freedom Ministries. Anticipating budget cuts in the upcoming year following the financial meltdown, Chestnut argued that education and social services could not withstand additional cuts, saying, "We've cut to the bare bone now. So we're talking about cutting to the bone marrow." With the economic decline, he asserted that colleges and universities should make it easier for people to attend, which could have meant making Bright Futures need-based, not merit-based. Helped in part by Barack Obama's coattails in the state in the 2008 presidential election, Chestnut crushed DeCastro to win a second term, winning 70% of the vote.

In 2010, Chestnut was re-elected unopposed to his third and, ultimately, final term in the state legislature.

== Alachua County Commission ==
In 2012, rather than seek re-election to the legislature, Chestnut instead opted to run for a seat on the Alachua County Commission from the 5th District. When the previous 5th District Commissioner, Rodney Long, resigned in 2011, Governor Rick Scott appointed Winston Bradley to succeed him, but Bradley did not seek re-election the following year. Chestnut won the Democratic primary uncontested, and advanced to the general election, where he faced business consultant Dean Cheshire, the Republican nominee, and Siva Prasad, an independent candidate. He campaigned on reforming the permitting process to create jobs, reinvesting in the Community Agency Partnership Program, protecting the environment through the Alachua County Forever program, and hiring a new city manager. Ultimately, the contest was not particularly close, with Chestnut winning by a wide margin, receiving 54% of the vote to Cheshire's 43% and Prasad's 3%.

== Personal life ==
Chestnut has two children: a daughter, actress Ashlei Sharpe-Chestnut, from his first marriage; and a son from his second marriage to Tiffany Watts.
