= Eleanor Chesnut =

American medical missionary (1868–1905)

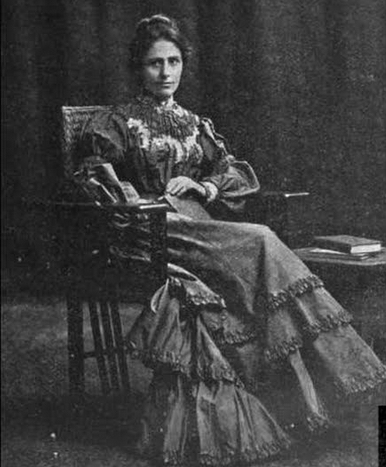
Eleanor Chesnut, from a 1906 publication.

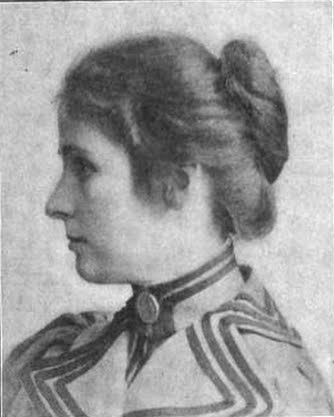
Eleanor Chesnut, from a 1906 publication.

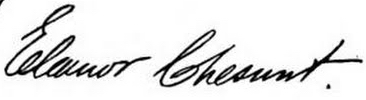
Eleanor Chesnut's signature, from a 1905 publication.

Eleanor Chesnut (January 8, 1868 – October 29, 1905), sometimes written as Eleanor Chestnut, was an American Christian medical missionary and translator who worked in China from 1894 until her murder in 1905.

== Early life ==
Eleanor "Nell" E. Chesnut was born in Waterloo, Iowa. She was a twin, and her mother died soon after her birth; she was raised by neighbors named Merwin, and later by relatives in Hatton, Missouri. She attended Park College, a Presbyterian school in Missouri. She graduated from the college in 1888, and attended Women's Medical College, the Illinois Training School for Nurses, and Moody Bible Institute, in her preparation for becoming a medical missionary.

== Mission work in China ==
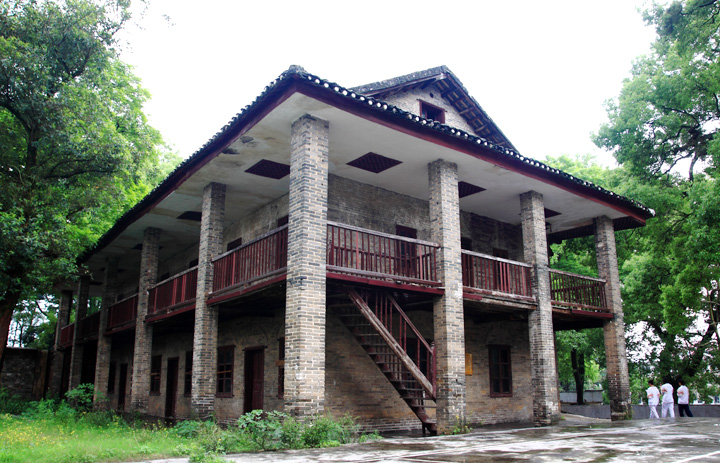
A building of the former mission hospitals still stands in Lianzhou.

Eleanor Chesnut worked briefly as a physician at the women's reformatory in Framingham, Massachusetts. She sailed from San Francisco for China as a missionary in 1894. She worked in Lianzhou, where she ran a women's hospital, traveled by horseback to hold clinics in small villages, and trained local women as nurses. She advocated for the building of schools and public health measures. She also translated books into the Lianzhou dialect, including the Gospel of Matthew and a nursing textbook. In a letter, she wrote, "I don't think we are in any danger, but if we are, we might as well die suddenly in God's work as by some long-drawn-out illness at home."

During a furlough in the United States from 1902 to 1903, Chesnut gave lectures and raised funds for her work. "I do not feel that I am spiritual enough to be a missionary," she told a friend during this visit. In October 1905, she and three other Americans, and one child, were killed by a mob stirred to violence by her removal of a ceremonial structure.

== Memorials ==
In 1907, a brass plaque naming Chesnut as one of the five "Missionary Martyrs" was installed at the Presbyterian Foreign Mission Board headquarters in New York City. Her story was presented (and continues to be presented) as an example of Christian sacrifice in church educational materials.
