= Ergot (horse anatomy) =

Callus under the fetlock of an equine

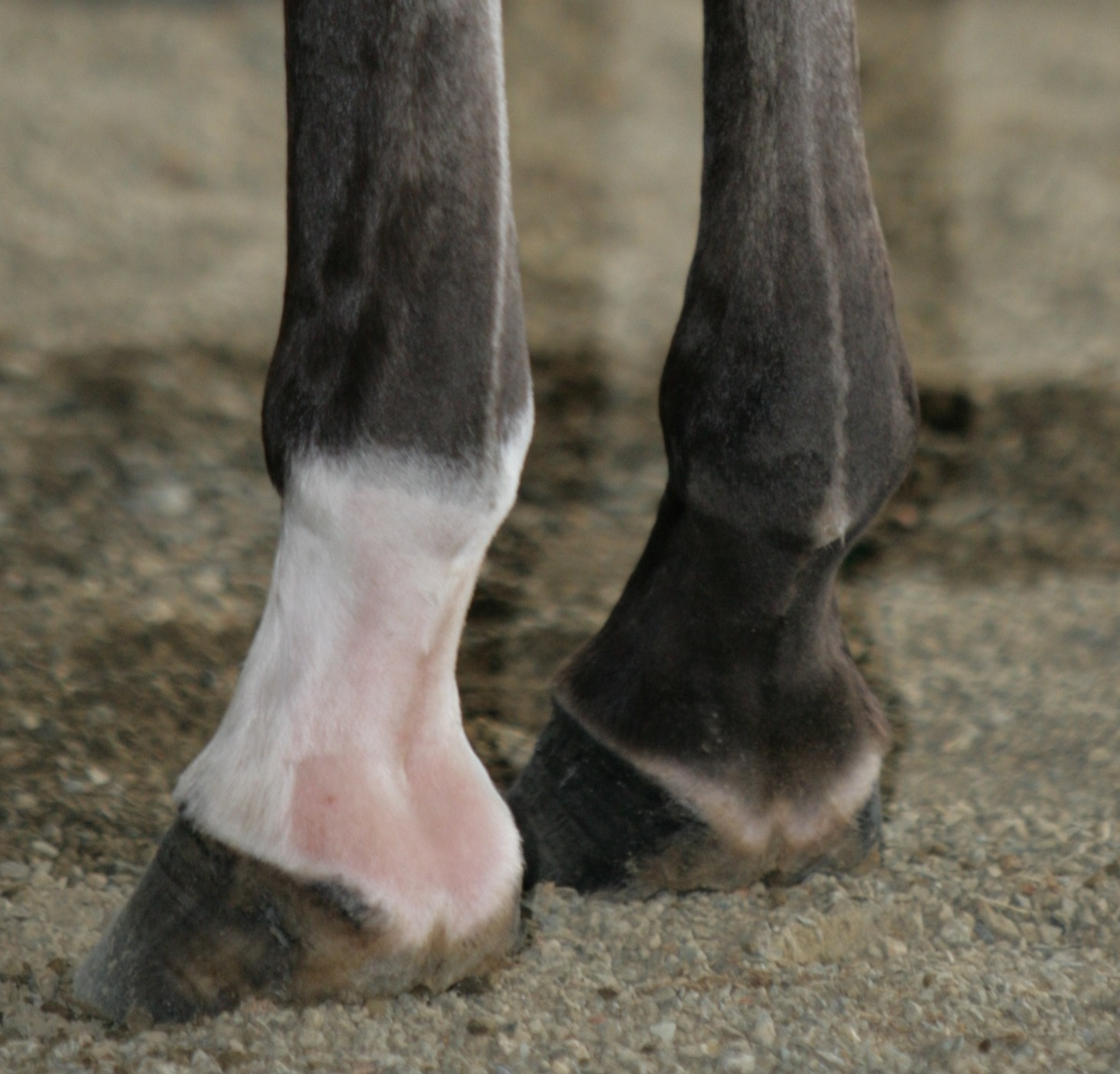
On this horse, the ergot is a small point at the back of each fetlock

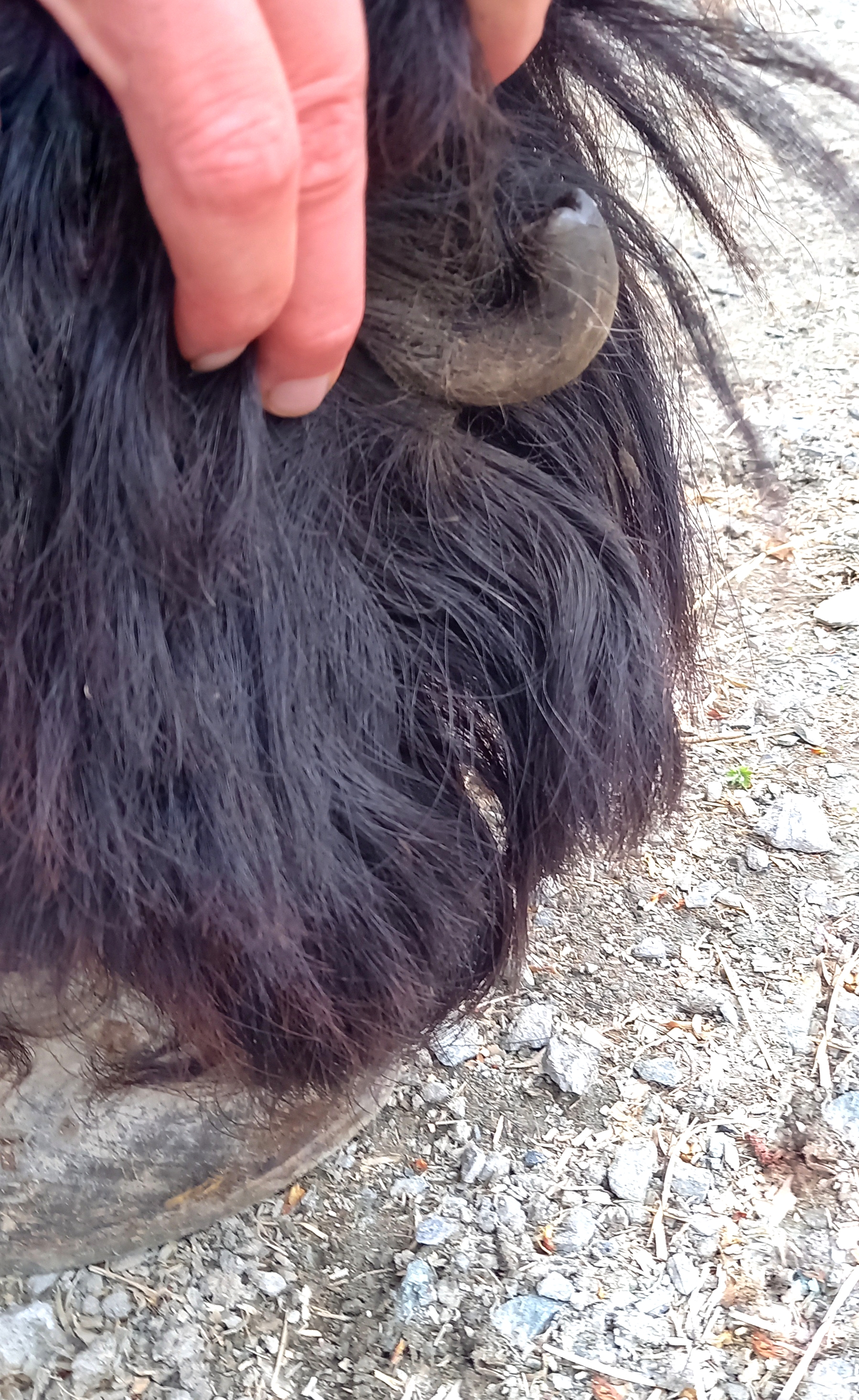
Ergot on a heavy horse with feathers.

The ergot is a small callosity (Calcar metacarpeum and Calcar metatarseum) on the underside of the fetlock of a horse or other equine. Some equines have them on all four fetlocks; others have few or no detectable ergots. In horses, the ergot varies from very small to the size of a pea or bean, larger ergots occurring in horses with "feather" – long hairs on the lower legs. In some other equines, the ergot can be as much as 3.8 cm (1.5 in) in diameter.

The word ergot comes from French ergot 'rooster's spur'.

== Evolution ==
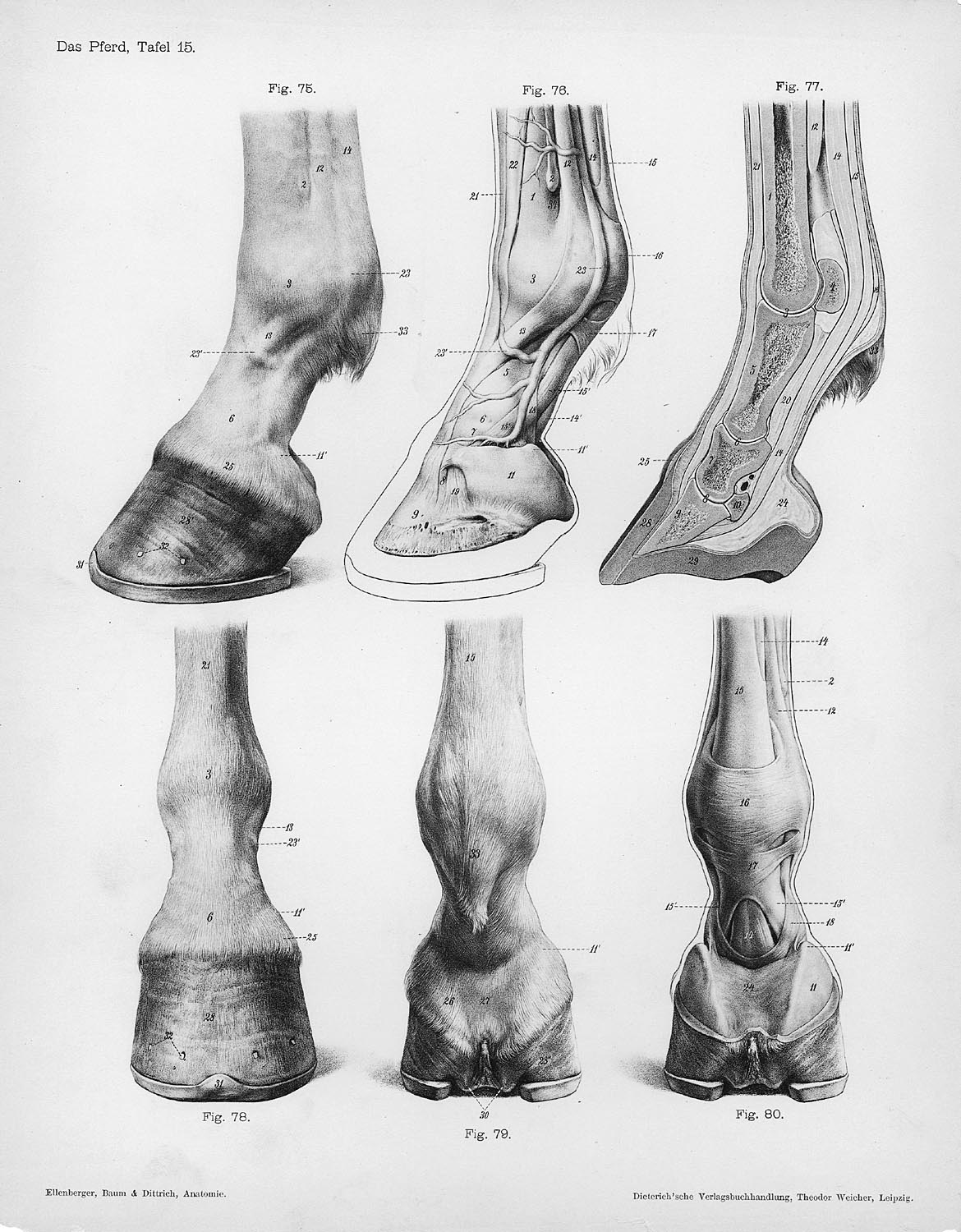
The ergot is numbered 33 (click on image for closer view)

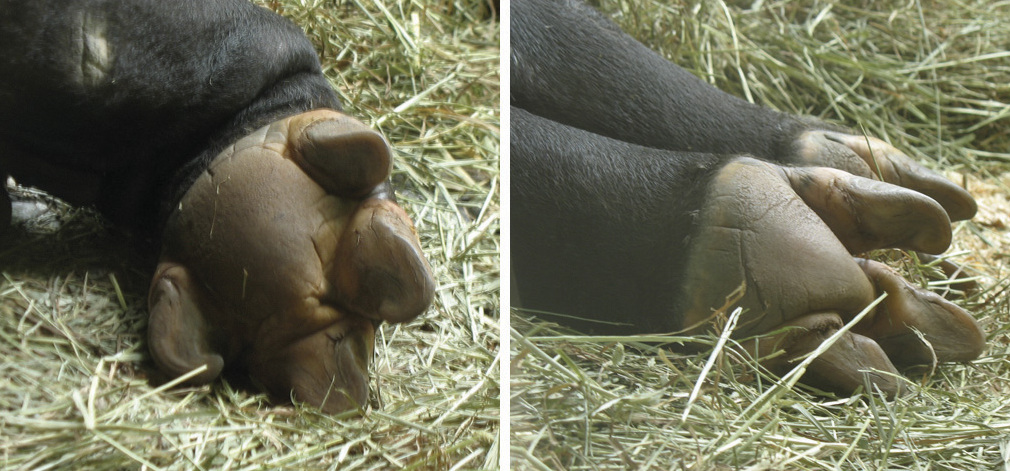
Tapir hooves showing sole pad and toes

Like the chestnut, the ergot is thought to be a vestige of some part of the ancestral foot of the multi-toed Equidae, the ergot corresponding to the sole pad of other extant members of Perissodactyla, such as the tapir and rhinoceros. Unlike the chestnut, which in the same individual may be large on the forelegs and smaller or even absent on the hindlegs the ergot is of roughly equal size on all four legs.

== See also ==
- Equine forelimb anatomy
