= Ashlei Sharpe Chestnut =

American Broadway, film, and television actress

- Born: Gainesville, Florida
- Education: University of North Carolina, Greensboro (BFA)
- Occupations: Actress, writer
- Years active: 2014–present
- Father: Charles S. Chestnut IV

Ashlei Sharpe Chestnut is an American actress and writer who has worked on Broadway, film and television. She is best known for her roles as Ensign Sidney La Forge in the third season of Star Trek: Picard (2023) and Doctor Naomi Howard in Chicago Med.

== Early life ==
Ashlei Sharpe Chestnut was born in Gainesville, Florida to Leslie Sharpe Chestnut and Charles S. Chestnut IV and was raised in Charlotte, North Carolina. Chestnut attended Northwest School of the Arts with a major in Theatre and a minor in Dance. In 2015, she graduated with a Bachelor of Fine Arts in Acting from The University of North Carolina at Greensboro's School of Music, Theatre and Dance.

== Stage credits ==
Year	Title	Role	Theater	Notes
2014	Brother Wolf	Shadow	Triad Stage	Independent regional theater near UNCG College of Visual and Performing Arts
2014	A Christmas Carol	Belle	Triad Stage	Independent regional theater near UNCG College of Visual and Performing Arts
2016	The Crucible	Susanna Walcott	Walter Kerr Theatre	Broadway debut
2017	A Doll's House, Part 2	Emmy	John Golden Theatre	Understudy

== Filmography ==
Year	Title	Role	Notes
2015	Gotham	Officer Katherine Parks	Episode: "A Bitter Pill to Swallow"
2016	The Mysteries of Laura	Becky	Episode: "The Mystery of the Dark Heart"
2016–2017	Homeland	Simone Bah	Recurring role (season 6)
2018	The Good Fight	Rachelle Dabrezil	Episode: "Day 464"
2018	Amazon Studios: Panic	Natalie Williams	Main cast, unaired pilot,
2019	Instinct	Theresa Daniels	Episode: "Grey Matter"
2019	Prodigal Son	Islande	Episode: "The Trip"
2020	Give or Take	Stella	
2021	Cruel Summer	Ashley Wallis	2 episodes
2021	National Parks Investigation	Penny Stanton	Unaired pilot
2022	Rap Shit	Fatima Assan	Recurring Guest Star (season 1)
2022–2023	NCIS: Los Angeles	FBI Special Agent Summer Morehurst	2 episodes
2023	Our Deadly Vows	Stacey	ABFF, Bentonville Film Festival
2023	Star Trek: Picard	Ensign Sidney La Forge	10 episodes (season 3)
2023	The Ready Room	Herself	Episode: "The Bounty"
2024	Dear Luke, Love Me	Madison	
2024	Mistletoe & Matrimony	Olivia Morris	Television film
2024–2026	Chicago Med	Doctor Naomi Howard	Recurring Guest Star (seasons 9–11)
