= Chesnutt =

Chesnutt is a surname. Notable people with the surname include:

- Charles W. Chesnutt (1858–1932), American author, essayist, political activist and lawyer
- Cody Chesnutt (born 1968), American musician from Georgia
- Mark Chesnutt (born 1963), American country music singer
- Vic Chesnutt (1964–2009), American singer-songwriter from Georgia

== See also ==
- Chesnut
- Anne Chesnutt Middle School, year-round middle school, part of Cumberland County Schools in Fayetteville, North Carolina
- CESNET
- Chess-Nuts
- Chestnut
