= Chestnut (horse anatomy) =

Equine body part

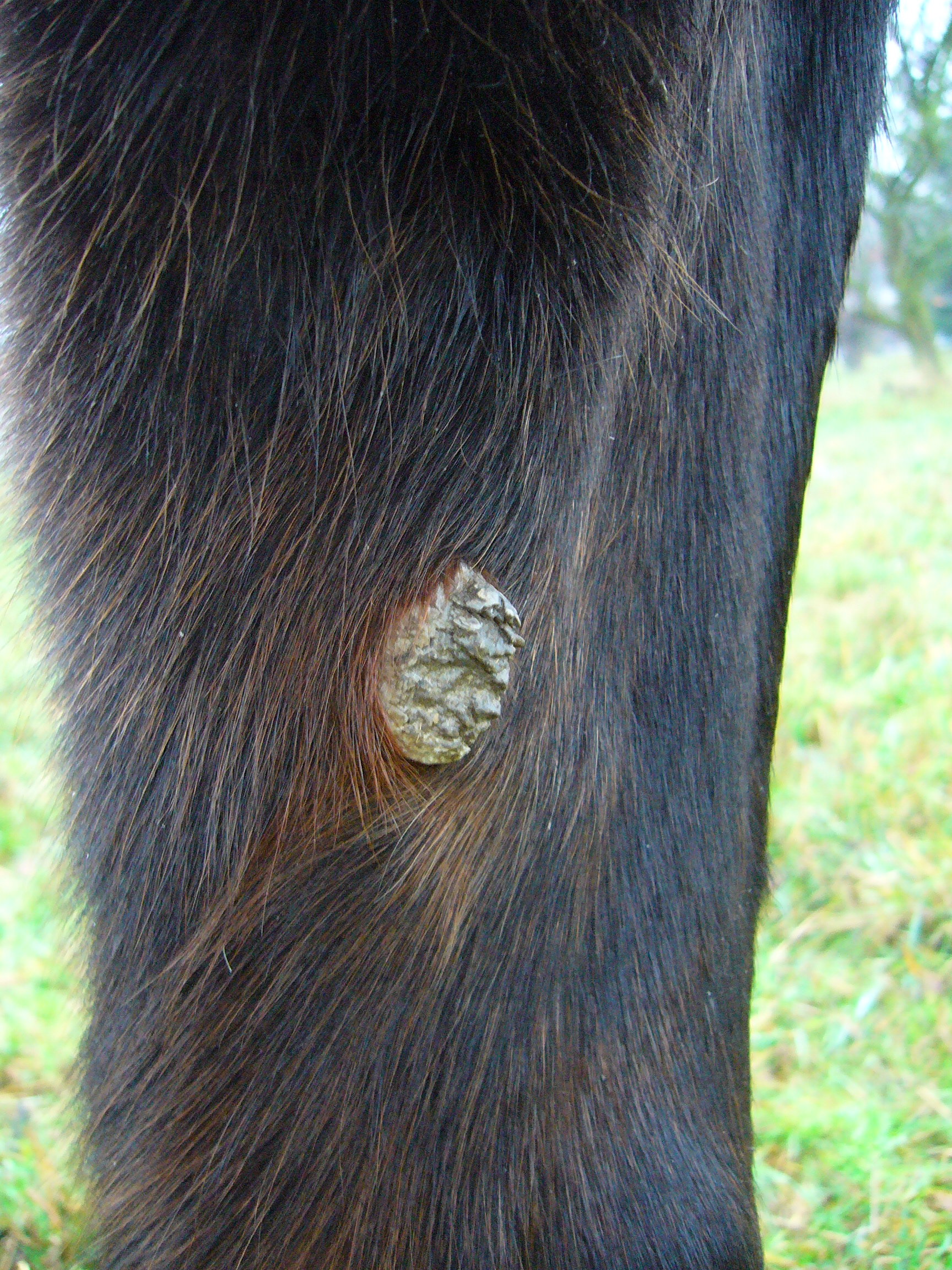
Chestnut on the front leg of a horse

The chestnut is a keratinized growth found on the inner side of the leg above the knee on the front leg, and if present, below the hock on the hind leg in many equines. It is often referred to as the night eye. Chestnuts are rough and callous-like, and grow in layers. It is believed to be part of a vestigial toe of extinct equidae. Chestnuts vary in shape, size, and color. Some breed registries require photographs of them, among other individual characteristics, to help identify the individual. However, chestnuts appearance is subject to change because they grow and can be groomed for neatness.

== Structure and composition ==
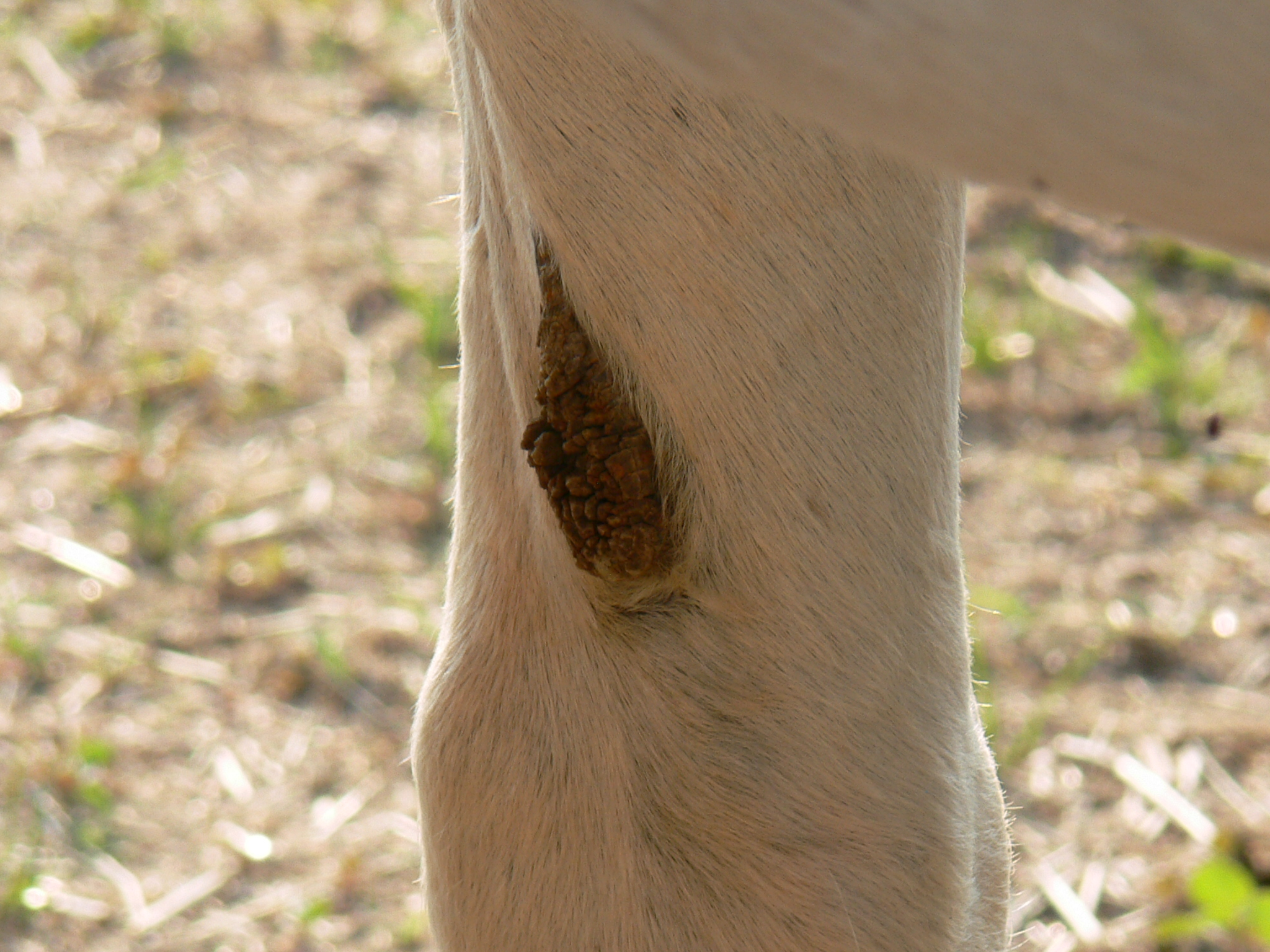
Chestnut

Chestnuts are primarily composed of a protein called keratin. This is the same protein that makes hair, hooves, and even human fingernails. Chestnuts can be any variation of brown, gray, or black, like an equine's hooves. Chestnuts are located on the inside of an equine's leg. They can be found on the front legs or back legs, but it depends on the breed or species. On the front leg, it is located above the knee, while on the hind leg, it is located below the hock.

== Variation among species and breeds ==
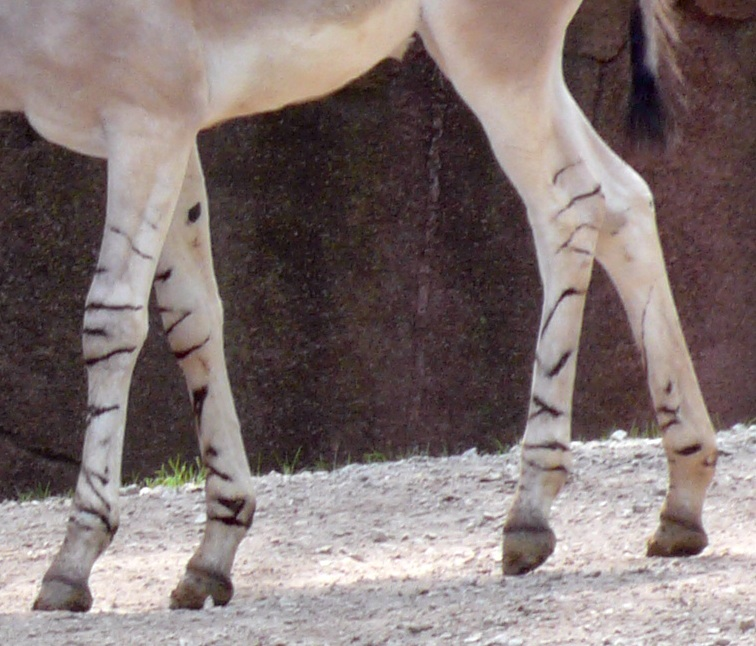
African wild ass foal with black chestnut on foreleg, no chestnut on hindleg

Chestnuts do not appear the same for all equines, and are part of the genetic diversity even between horse breeds. Donkeys and zebras only have chestnuts on their front legs. The Przewalski's horse has them on all four legs. Most domestic horse breeds have chestnuts on all four legs, but some horse breeds lack them on their hind legs. These breeds include:

- Banker horse (most individuals)
- Caspian pony (some individuals)
- Icelandic horse (most individuals)

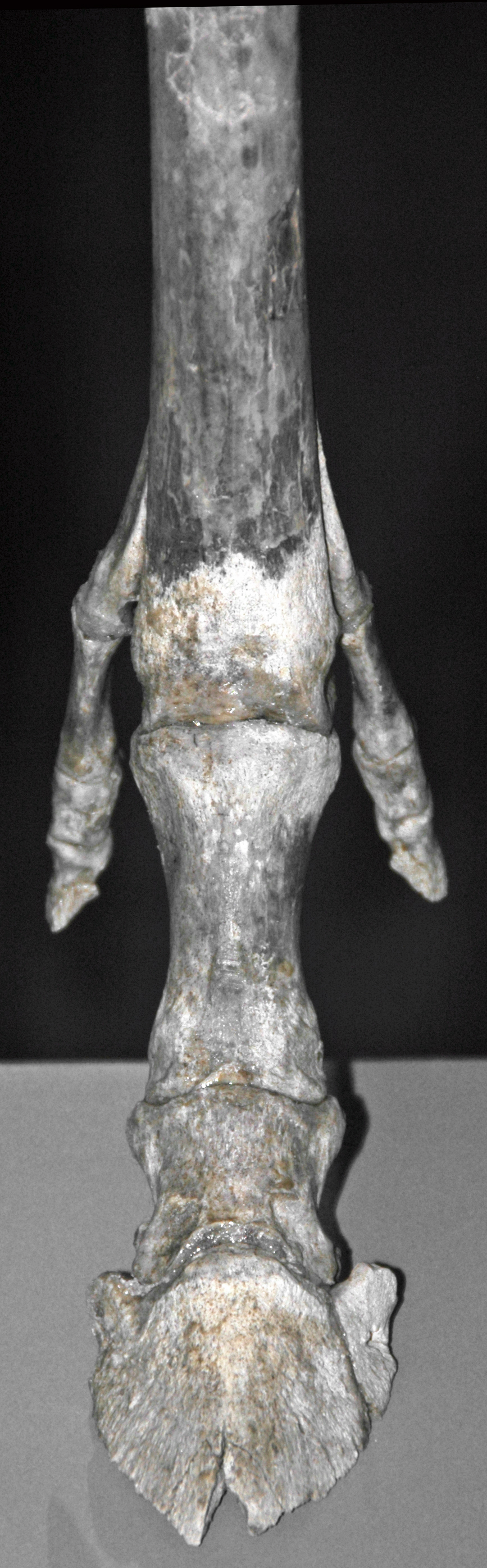
An ancient horse leg with three toes

== Evolutionary significance ==
Chestnuts are thought to be the result of equine evolution over time. The Eohippus is one of the earliest ancestors of the modern-day horse. 55 million years ago, they had toes with hooves on the ends of them, four on the front feet and three on the hind. They were also only about 12 inches tall. It is thought that the chestnuts are the horse's vestigial toe. Some claim that chestnuts were similar to the pad on a paw. The frog and ergot are also keratinized growths that have evolved with chestnuts. Post-evolution, these callosities can serve as a way for equines to scratch their faces.

== Care and management ==
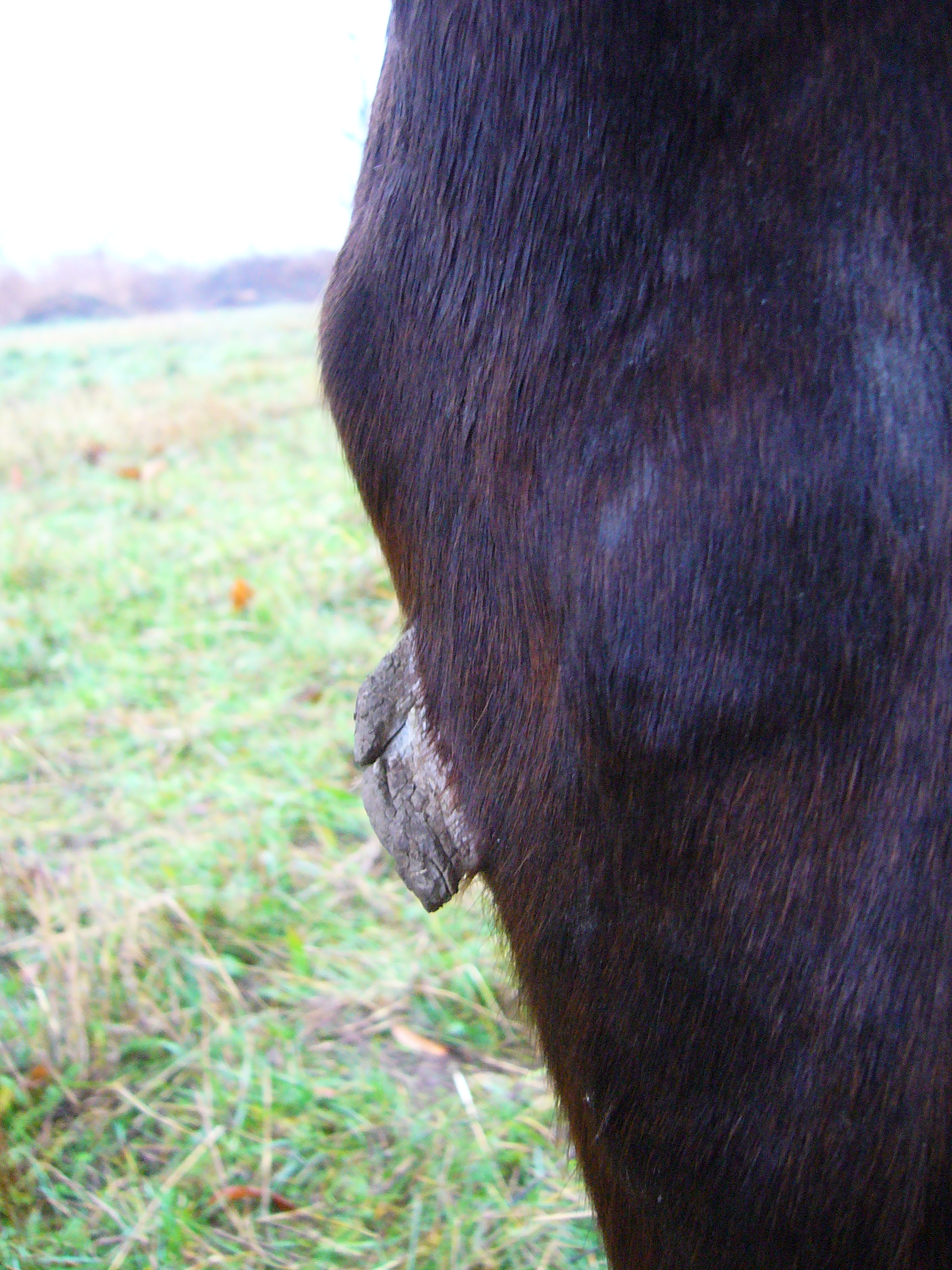
Overgrown chestnut on a horse's leg

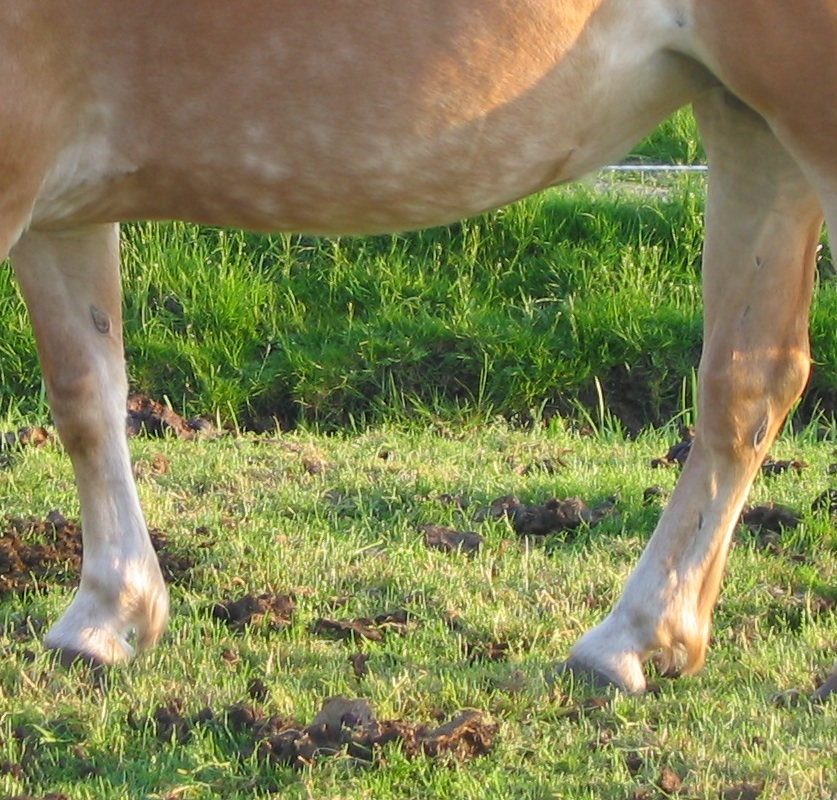
Domestic horse with chestnuts on fore and hind legs

As chestnuts grow over time, they can be groomed for a cleaner appearance, especially for competitions. They grow, like fingernails, until they are trimmed down. They may be softened with oils, lotions, or bathing prior to trimming or peeling. Many farriers will perform this task because cutting down too close to the skin can be sensitive or even painful, so many owners choose to not do it themselves. Chestnuts will peel off in layers on their own over time if not groomed.

== See also ==
- Frog (horse anatomy)
- Ergot (horse anatomy)
