= Incense Burner of Amir Saif al-Dunya wa l-Din ibn Muhammad al-Mawardi =

Iranian artistic object

Incense Burner of Amir Saif al-Dunya wa’l-Din ibn Muhammad al-Mawardi
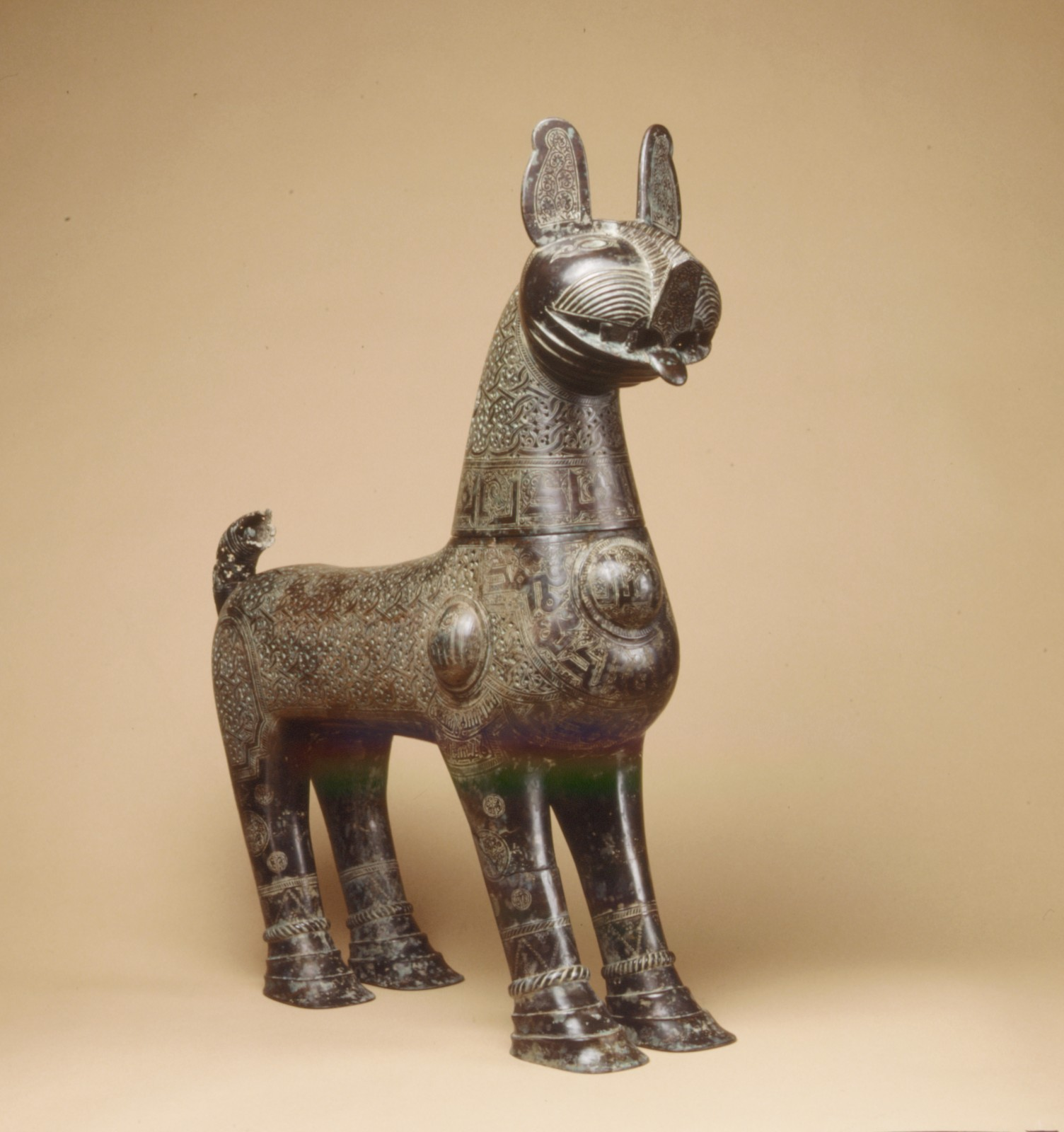
- Medieval Incense burner from Khurasan, Iran
- Artist: Ja`far ibn Muhammad ibn `Ali
- Year: 577 AH/1181–82 CE
- Catalogue: 51.56
- Medium: Bronze
- Subject: Zoomorphic Incense burner
- Dimensions: 85.1 cm × 22.9 cm × 82.6 cm (33.5 in × 9.0 in × 32.5 in)
- Condition: Generally good but some damaged elements
- Location: The Metropolitan Museum of Art, New York City, USA

The Amir Saif al-Dunya wa'l-Din ibn Muhammad al-Mawardi incense burner was discovered at the 'Ruins of Kariz', Khorasan, Iran. It is an object that gives contemporaries an insight into the artistic world of Medieval Iran. Its provenance lies in its monumental scale and elaborate ornamentation. The incense burner, now housed in the Metropolitan Museum of Art (MET Museum) New York, is unique because it is one of the very few incense burners that has the date, 577 AH/1181–82 CE, inscribed on it.

== General information ==
The incense burner stands tall at an astonishing height of 33 1/2 inches and length of 32 1/2 inches. It is the largest 'zoomorphic incense burner' discovered in Khorasan. It has been described as an 'enigmatic object' due to its appearance that seems to combine an amalgam of animals: ranging from a feline to an equine mammal. There are seventeen other feline incense burners that have been identified as 'zoomorphic incense burners' from this period, they too combine an amalgam of mammals in their design.

== Dimensions and use ==
This object is recognised as an incense burner because of the perforations in the body, chest, neck and tail, allowing smoke to diffuse through its body. Its head is removable and can be twisted to lock into place using a 'bayonet lock'. This type of 'lock' on an animal of this scale gives a clearer understanding into the use of the object. Larger coals and more incense would have been burned, presumably meaning it perfumed a larger space compared to other incense burners such as the 'Cleveland Feline Incense burner', which was smaller at 35.50x11.00cm, meaning it would have been used in a smaller, intimate space.

== Incense and its use in Medieval Iran ==
Incense was a large part of urban life in Khurasan, it was used in multiple aspect of daily life such as health, well-being and commercial activity. Ağa-Oğlu describes it being used for an antiseptic for its fumigation properties as well as embalming the dead during 'magical, religious or social occasions'. Additionally, according to Ja'fari, it was 'burnt to make a sweet pleasant smell'. The types of incense that would have been burnt according to an Abbasid court physician, explained by Kelly, included 'Musk, ambergris, Agarwood, camphor and saffron'. Incense was expensive since it was imported, instead cheaper local remedies were used, for example Peganum harmala. Matin argues that it was prized because of its magical and supernatural powers. When its used, it releases a 'fat and thick', scented smoke. If it had been used in this particular incense burner, of this scale, it would be assumed that it could be smelt by crowds of people.

== Analysis of zoomorphic form ==
=== Feline features ===
The sculpture’s face resembles a feline with pointed ears and a ‘facetted’ nose. The obscurely rounded face has two carved out almond shaped eyes, and the metal has various striations giving the face elaborate ornamentation. Larger striations flanking the nose could resemble whiskers showing the artist’s ability to capture a natural likeness of the animal in question. The ears are tall and flat with a slight dip towards the top of the ear and for this detail it can recall the ears on a Caracal. Cheetahs, lynxes, caracals and lions were four types of cats recognised by Kelly and were depicted for their symbolism in medieval Khurasan. As she outlines ‘hunting was important for pleasure, sustenance and as a means of honing skills for leadership and warfare’. Though this specific type of species is difficult to determine due to its ambiguous design, its wide body, muscular limbs and tail reflects the phisnomy of a lion instead of a smaller lynx or cheetah.

This incense burner represents a tamed and domesticated animal from the elaborate decoration on its head and feet, it is argued that ‘the majority of zoomorphic incense burners appear to represent tamed and trained felines'. The lower part of the sculptures jaw can be interpreted as a muzzle or a form of armour, alluding to this animals’ domestication. For the patron to include this feature of domestication, paired with the relaxed nature of the felines body, with its head upright, four paws/hooves firmly on the ground and tail curled further indicates this animal has been tamed. Additionally, the tongue on this animal sticks out, reflecting a relaxed behaviour as opposed to an aggressive snarl. It is common in art to represent animals in a domesticated setting to reflect highly on the patron, since it takes great skill to capture, train and tame an inherently wild animal. In addition, the inclusion of a lion on a work of art such as this would have venerated the patron highly because according to Kelly, [lions] ‘represented nobility, legitimacy, wisdom and justice, the characteristics associated with kingship,’ thereby a choice made by the artist or patron to include this certain aspect of the sculpture.

=== Equine features ===
The second animal this hybrid incorporates in the lower half of the sculpture can be assumed to be part of the equine family due to the feet resembling the Hoof of a horse, bull or mule, see: Equine anatomy. Horses in the context of medieval Khurasan are highly important. Not only are they seen as symbols of power, but were also essential to military success, as explained by Gommans, ‘the persistent role of the Central Eurasian warhorse prevented the conquering rulers of India and China from becoming entirely settled’. The horse’s physical strength, speed and height meant they were an advantage in battle and as a result, were highly praised. The hooves on this specific example are decorative, seen by the ornamental bands that mark the distinction between the foot and leg, perhaps also representing the Fetlock. The feet themselves are broad and flat, a feature not entirely natural and was probably a structural element added by the sculptor to provide a solid surface to channel the weight of the body. Structurally, hooves with a large surface were integral to support the weight of the sculpture, similarly the length of the legs are elongated not only for stylistic reasons but also to protect the object the sculpture surmounts from the heat when incense was burned. The decoration on this incense burner could resemble Hipposandal, shoes to protect the hoof of working equines.

== Production of zoomorphic incense burners ==
=== Lost-wax casting ===
Metalwork in Medieval Khurasan was made with a popular technique called 'lost-wax casting'. It was an ancient process that took was incredibly technical and required high levels of skill. The lost wax process is a ten-step method when casting molten bronze. To briefly outline the difficulty casting a sculpture like this takes, it begins with a plaster mould that is clad in wax and then covered in another plaster mould. The wax mould is where the detail is added wax is malleable, the artist would have spent significant amounts of time by carving the intricate detailing at this point in the process. Spurs and vents are added to plaster mould covering the plaster mould to give stability to the object. The plaster mould containing the wax sculpture is then heated to a degree hot enough to melt the wax leaving a gap ready for molten bronze to be poured in. It is also important to note this sculpture would have been made in multiple parts since because it was too large to be cast all at once. Once the molten bronze is poured and cooled, the plaster and channels are broken off to leave the sculpture that needs to be buffed and polished. It appears the use and size can be analysed together to communicate the wealth of the patron to the supposed large amount viewers.

== See also ==
- Incense
- Incense trade route
- Silk Road
- Greater Khorasan
- Greater Central Asia
- Lost-wax casting
- Seljuk Empire
