= Natural hoof care =

Horse management

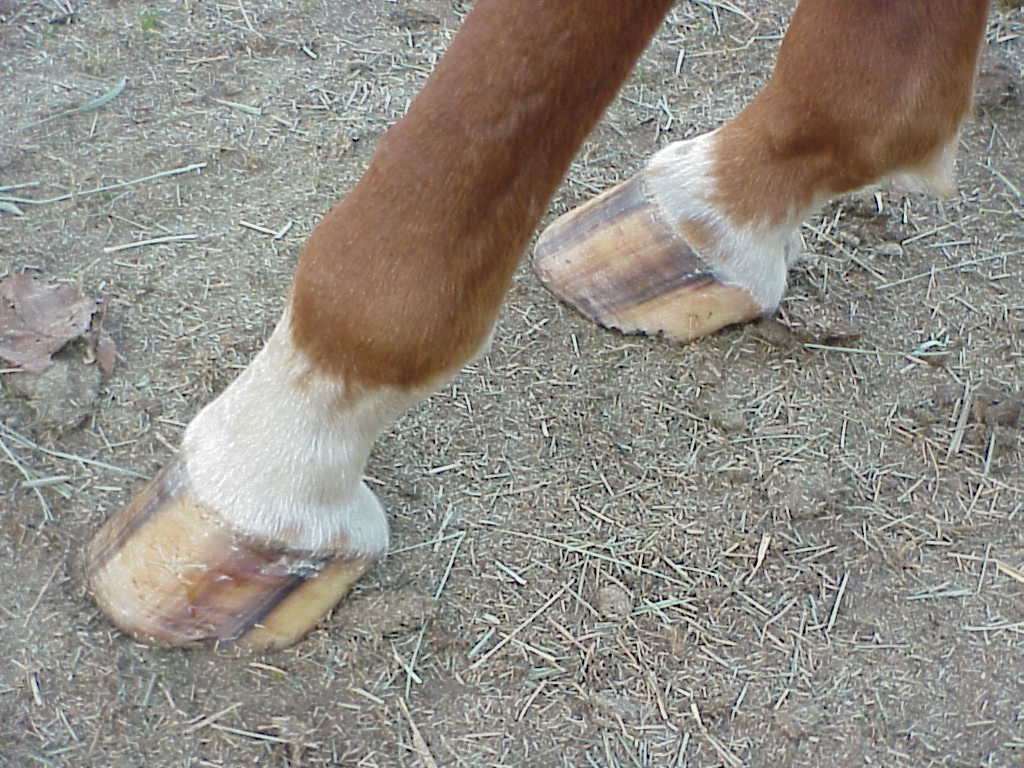
Bare hooves without horseshoes

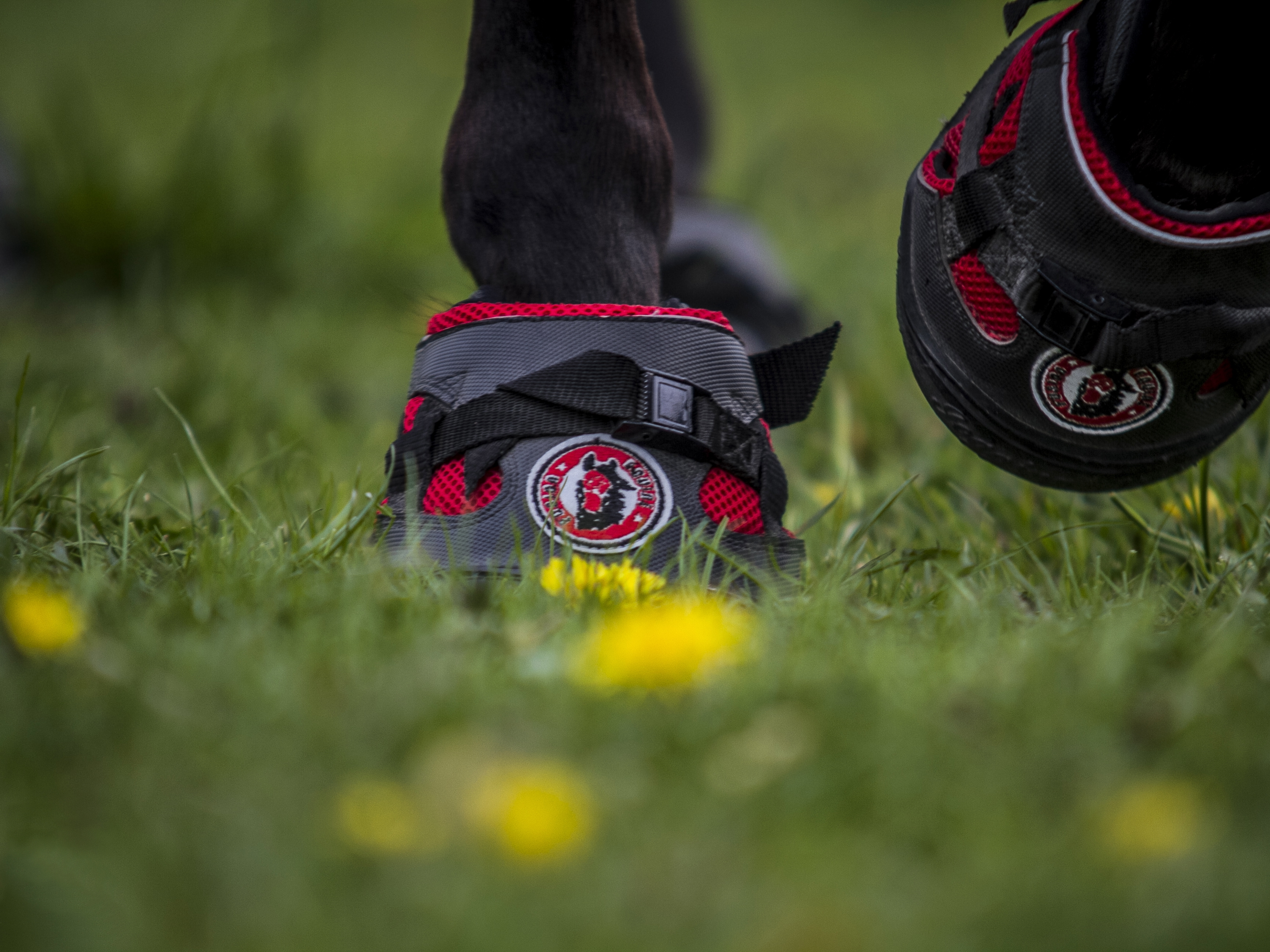
Removable hoof boots may be used on bare hooves

Natural hoof care is the holistic approach to horse hoof care based on the wild horse model, including natural boarding (Paddock Paradise natural horse boarding), natural horsemanship, a reasonably natural diet, and the natural trim itself. Modeled after the hooves of the U.S. Great Basin wild, free-roaming horse, natural hoof care consists of four distinct pillars known as Four Pillars of Natural Horse Care. The term was coined by Jackson and published in his book, The Natural Trim: Principles and Practice.

This progressive approach to hoof care is rooted in the understanding that nature, through 55 million years of evolution, has crafted a hoof that functions flawlessly without the need for shoes. Jackson claims that when maintained through natural, non-invasive trimming method such as the natural trim, the unshod hoof consistently outperforms its shod counterpart.

Jaime Jackson claims that conventional horseshoeing, especially when paired with other artificial care practices, is a major contributor to lameness and long-term unsoundness. Horseshoes interfere with the hoof’s natural mechanics—hindering circulation, dulling sensory feedback, introducing injury and infection through nails, and disrupting the body's thermal and structural balance. Over time, these effects compromise both equine wellbeing and rider safety. In contrast, embracing the natural hoof honors both the biology and the spirit of the horse, offering a path to soundness, longevity, and humane care.

== History ==
Natural hoof care is distinctly different from barefoot trimming methods such as equine podiatry, or the pasture trim. The former is a breakaway from the initial paradigm shift in hoof care management that exploded following Jaime Jackson's wild horse hoof research. The latter has been known to be commonly used by farriers.

Even though Jackson coined natural hoof care term in 1980s, he has learned that the idea of maintaining hooves in harmony with nature is not exclusive to his research. Jackson wrote:

The Mongols of East-Central Asia use horses for their transportation, as they have for thousands of years. Their horses are neither trimmed nor shod, and their hooves are exemplary by natural hoof care standards. These nomadic horsed peoples were visited by an AANHCP practitioner during the early 2000s, who naturally wanted to know who did the awesome hoof work. With a bewildered look, one of the tribal elders responded, "Mother Nature."

— The Natural Trim: Principles and Practice

Horses were ridden and used for work by humans for thousands of years before horseshoes were invented. The Ancient Greeks did not shoe their horses, and Xenophon in his classic work on horsemanship wrote, "naturally sound hooves get spoiled in most stalls," and advised measures to strengthen horses' feet:

To secure the best type of stable-yard, and with a view to strengthening the horse's feet, I would suggest to take and throw down loosely four or five waggon loads of pebbles, each as large as can be grasped in the hand, and about a pound in weight; the whole to be fenced round with a skirting of iron to prevent scattering. The mere standing on these will come to precisely the same thing as if for a certain portion of the day the horse were, off and on, stepping along a stony road; whilst being curried or when fidgeted by flies he will be forced to use his hoofs just as much as if he were walking. Nor is it the hoofs merely, but a surface so strewn with stones will tend to harden the frog of the foot also.

Natural hoof care as it was gradually developed by Jaime Jackson in 2000 materialised into the first non-profit training organisation-AANHCP (American Association of Natural Hoof Care Practitioners, later changed its name for Association for the Advancement of Natural Hoof Care Practices retaining its acronym). Later on, in 2009 this role was taken over by Jaime Jackson.

Currently there are other organisations in competition providing training on natural hoof care around the world.

== Benefits of barefooting ==
Horses have been used without shoes throughout history. Not only does the horse benefit with a healthier hoof in some cases, it can be less expensive to keep a horse barefoot, and many owners have learned to trim their horses' hooves themselves. As the health and movement benefits of barefooting have become more apparent in horses that have completed transition, horses are being competed barefoot in various sports (including dressage, show jumping, flat racing, steeplechase racing, trail riding and endurance riding).

== The Natural Trim Method ==
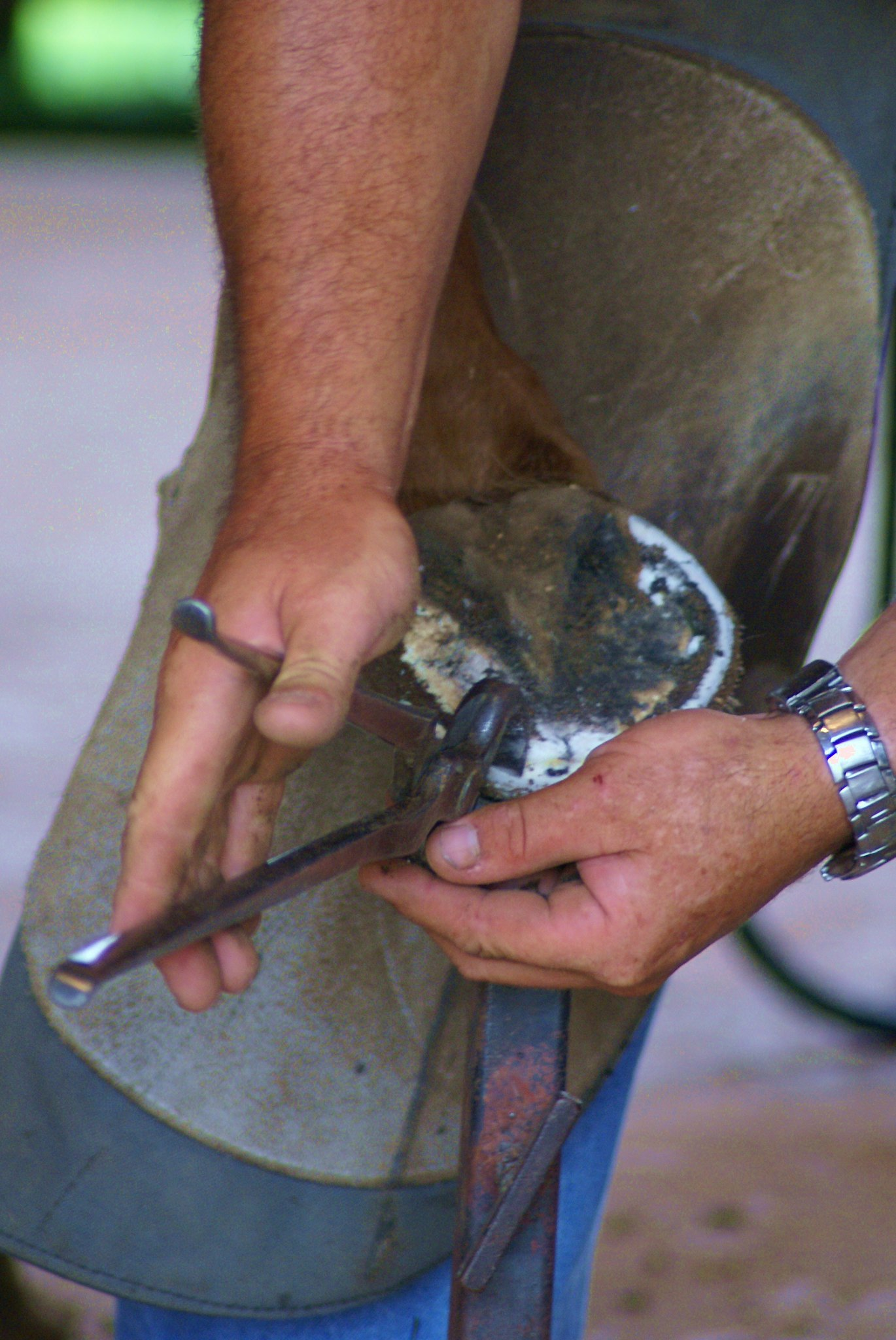
Hoof nippers are used to begin a trim of the hoof wall.

The natural trim is described by Jackson as a "humane barefoot trim method that mimics the natural wear patterns of wild horse feet exemplified by wild, free-roaming horses of the U.S. Great Basin.". The Natural trim was originally called "wild horse trim," by Jackson when he was still a farrier. But he quickly changed its name to the "Natural Trim" after the term was adamantly rejected by his clients who did not welcome "wildness" associated with their horses.

The natural trim method was developed gradually across several decades, initiated by the wild horse hoof research at the Litchfield BLM Corrals. Jackson measured 1000 wild horse hooves across the span of four years for toe length, toe angle, hoof width, and hoof length. These were the measurements he believed would be important to hoof care professionals.

Jackson draws a distinction between the Natural trim method, which focuses on the specifics of trim mechanics, and natural hoof care, which is much broader, encompassing all aspects of the horse's life that impact the health and growth patterns of the hoof. Jackson considers the natural trim method as key to the formation of natural growth patterns including the turn of the grounding bearing surface of the hoof wall he calls the "Mustang Roll." Jackson has dubbed this unique roll of the hoof wall as "nature's horseshoe."

== Alternatives to horseshoes ==
Removable iron horseshoes known as "hipposandals" may have been invented by the Roman legions. Nailed-on shoes were certainly used in Europe by the Middle Ages.

Horses were shod with nailed-on horseshoes from the Middle Ages to the present, though well-trained farriers also performed barefoot trimming for horses that did not require the additional protection of shoes. It has become standard practice to shoe most horses in active competition or work. However, with the emergence of natural hoof care there is a growing movement to move away from shoeing as the first choice. Jackson during his farrier days have noted that shoes actually damaged the hoof, and was seeking an answer to a question: What did nature intend for the equine hoof?

Advocates of natural hoof care point out many benefits to keeping horses barefoot and present studies showing that shoeing can cause or exacerbate certain hoof ailments in the horse.

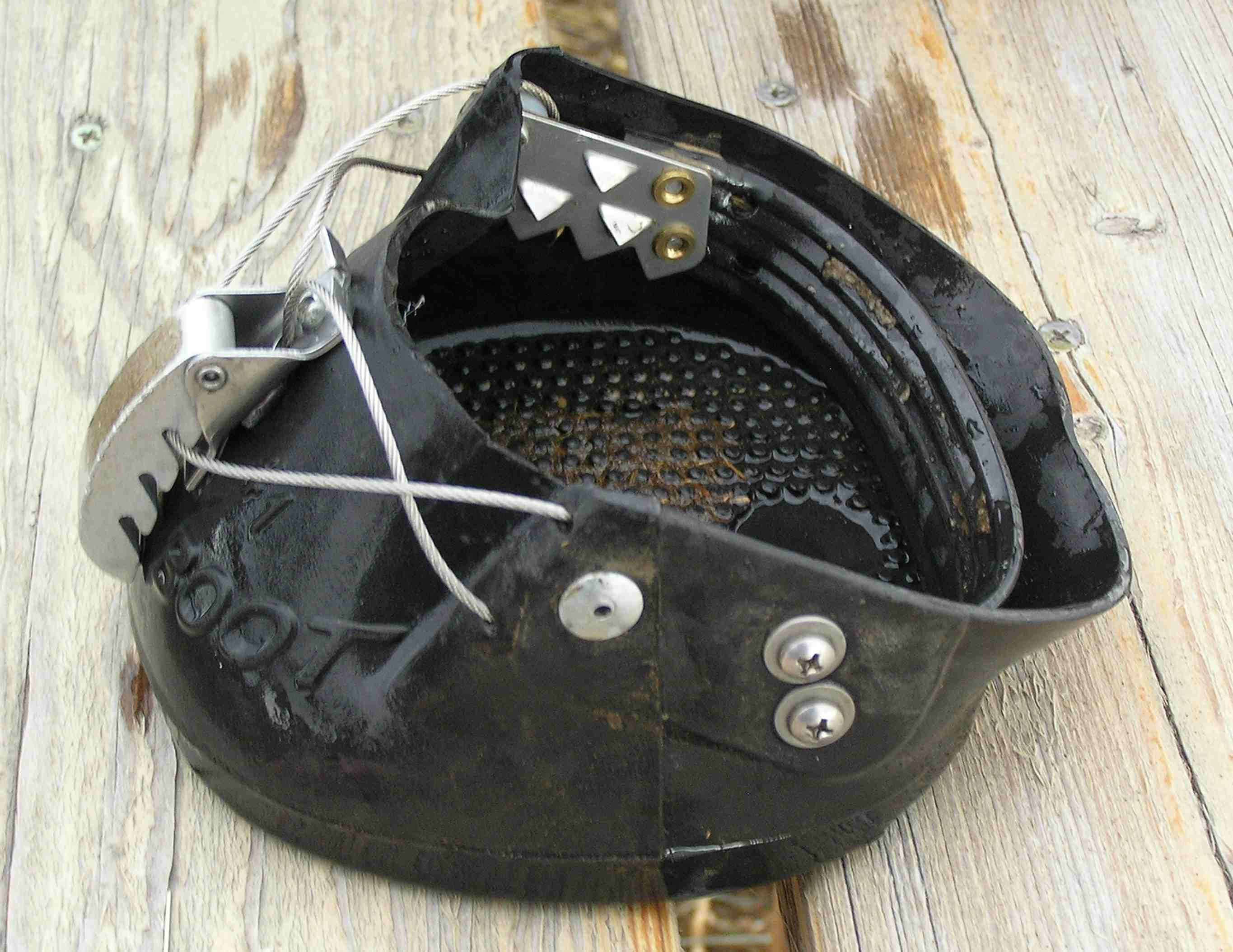
A hoof boot may help protect the horse's hooves during the transition period.

Damage from wearing horseshoes can vary depending on methodology, time in shoes and condition of the hoof. Transitioning out of shoes can be problematic and requires in depth knowledge of the characteristics of naturally shaped hoof to avoid invading the natural structures of the hoof capsule.

Hoof boots can be very helpful in providing aid when transitioning horses out of shoes as well as an alternative to shoes when riding. Hooves still need protection when navigating through hard surfaces such as concrete or asphalt roads. At present there is wide choice of different hoof boots to fit every occasion, from rehabilitation to performance riding.

Hoof's sole can often be sensitive after shoe removal, oftentimes due to excessive removal of the solar plates. It is important that proper care is provided and time for the hoof capsule to recover and build callus. During this transition period, the horse can be fitted with hoof boots which protect the soles of the feet until the horse has time to heal and build up callouses, though these boots, especially when not properly fitted and used, can cause hoof damage as well.

Hoof boot fitting requires some experience in order to fit the boot onto the hoof, rather than trying to shape the hoof to fit the boot.

== Hoof health ==
The two things which can directly affect the health of the hoof are diet and exercise. Observers of wild horse populations note that the equine hoof stays in notably better condition when horses are in a herd situation and are free to move around 24 hours a day, as wild horses do, permitting good circulation inside the hoof. It is recommended that horses be allowed to walk at least five miles per day for optimum hoof health. The terrain should be varied, including gravel or hard surfaces and a water feature where the hooves can be wet occasionally.

Diet & nutrition is very important too, as changes in feed can directly affect hoof health, most notably seen in cases of laminitis. Even hay/grass may be high enough in sugar to cause laminitis. A healthy diet for horses currently with or prone to laminitis is based on free access to hay that has been tested for carbohydrate content and found to be less than 10% WSC + starch, appropriate mineral supplementation, and no grain. Feeds and forage with high levels of sugar (carbohydrates) correlate with higher risk of clinical or subclinical laminitis and with other hoof ailments.

Natural hoof supplements can be used as a boost to the immune systems of horses when concerned with laminitis or other hoof ailments. D-Biotin supplements, often including the sulfur-containing amino acid dl-Methionine, are commonly known supplements that may be helpful for managing hoof health if they're deficient/imbalanced in the diet.

Modern research by individuals such as Jaime Jackson and Tia Nelson have studied feral horses to observe the way in which their natural foraging and roaming affects their hooves. They noticed that the hooves of these horses have a different configuration from domestic horses kept in soft pasture, having shorter toes and thicker, stronger hoof walls.

== Controversies ==
Whether wearing shoes or going barefoot is better for the horse is the subject of some controversy. Opponents of the barefoot movement argue that domesticated horses are routinely put through abnormal levels of activity, stress, and strain, and their hooves undergo excessive wear and shock. Stable-kept horses are not exposed to the same environment as wild horses, which can affect their hoof quality. Additionally, humans sometimes favor certain traits over hoof quality (such as speed), and will breed horses with poor hoof quality if they are exceptional athletes. This can lead to overall decreased hoof quality within a breed and in riding horses in general. Advocates of traditional hoof care suggest that shoeing is needed to protect the hoof from unnatural destruction, and that the horseshoe and its various incarnations has been necessary to maintain the horse's usability under extreme and unnatural conditions.

== See also ==
- Equine forelimb anatomy
- Lameness (equine)
