= Horseshoe =

Device attached to a horse's hoof to protect it from wear

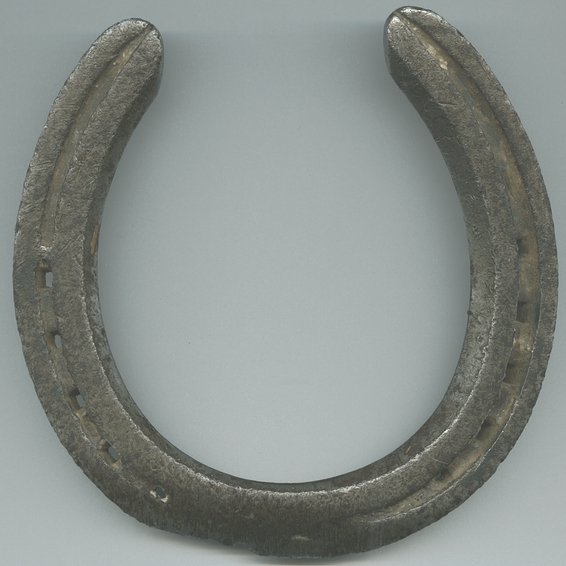
Horseshoes are commonly made of steel, and are nailed to the underside of the hoof.

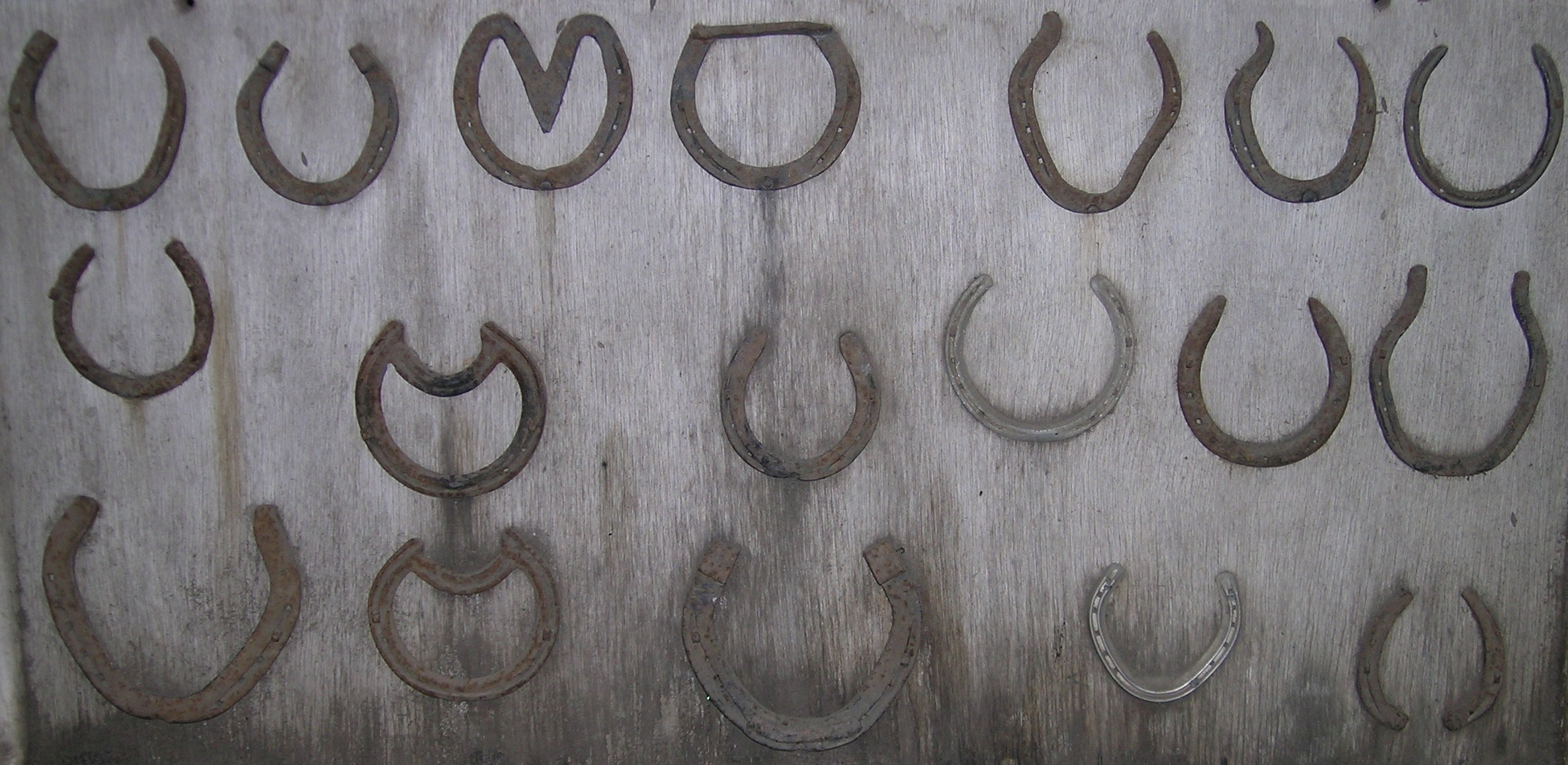
A variety of horseshoes, including aluminum racing plates (light or dark); there is also a variety of oxshoes at the lower right

A horseshoe is a piece of equestrian equipment that protects a horse hoof from wear. Shoes are attached on the palmar surface (ground side) of the hooves, usually nailed through the insensitive hoof wall, anatomically akin to the human toenail. Horseshoes can also be glued in certain situations.

Horseshoes are available in a wide variety of materials and styles, developed for different types of horses and for the work they do. The most common materials are steel and aluminium, but specialized shoes may include use of rubber, plastic, magnesium, titanium, or copper. Steel tends to be preferred in sports in which a strong, long-wearing shoe is needed, such as polo, eventing, show jumping, and western riding events. Aluminium shoes are lighter, making them common in horse racing where a lighter shoe is desired, and often facilitate certain types of movement; they are often favored in the discipline of dressage. Some horseshoes have "caulkins", "caulks", or "calks": protrusions at the toe or heels of the shoe, or both, to provide additional traction.

The fitting of horseshoes is a professional occupation, conducted by a farrier, who specializes in the preparation of feet, assessing potential lameness issues, and fitting appropriate shoes, including remedial features where required. In some countries, such as the UK, horseshoeing is legally restricted to people with specific qualifications and experience. In others, such as the United States, where professional licensing is not legally required, professional organizations provide certification programs that publicly identify qualified individuals.

The crescent shape of the horseshoe is a popular symbol of equestrianism throughout society. When kept as a talisman, a horseshoe is said to bring good luck. A stylized variation of the horseshoe is used for a popular throwing game, horseshoes.

== History ==
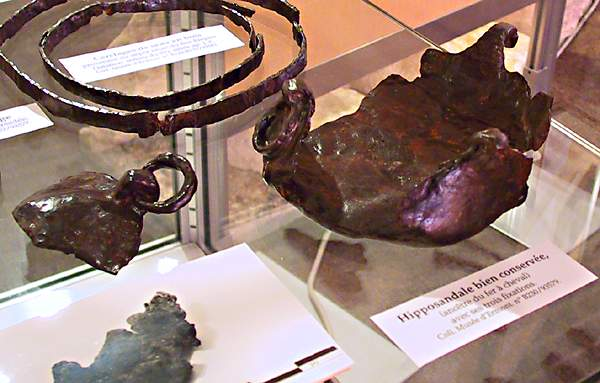
A hipposandal, a predecessor to the horseshoe

Since the early history of domestication of the horse, working animals were found to be exposed to many conditions that created breakage or excessive hoof wear. Ancient people recognized the need for the walls (and sometimes the sole) of domestic horses' hooves to have additional protection over and above any natural hardness. An early form of hoof protection was seen in ancient Asia, where horses' hooves were wrapped in rawhide, leather, or other materials for both therapeutic purposes and protection from wear. From archaeological finds in Great Britain, the Romans appeared to have attempted to protect their horses' feet with a strap-on, solid-bottomed "hipposandal" that has a slight resemblance to the modern hoof boot.

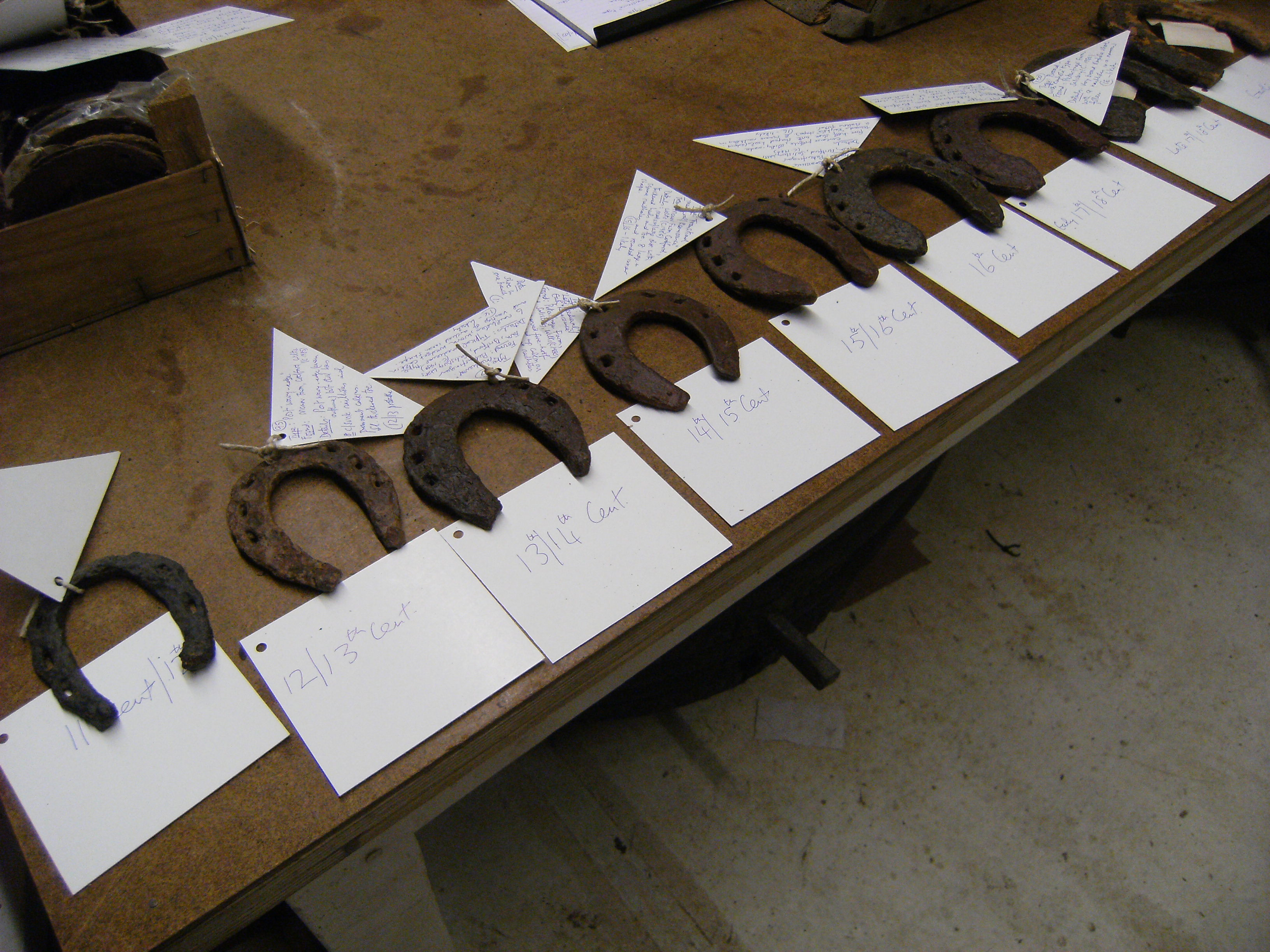
English horseshoes from the 11th to the 19th centuries

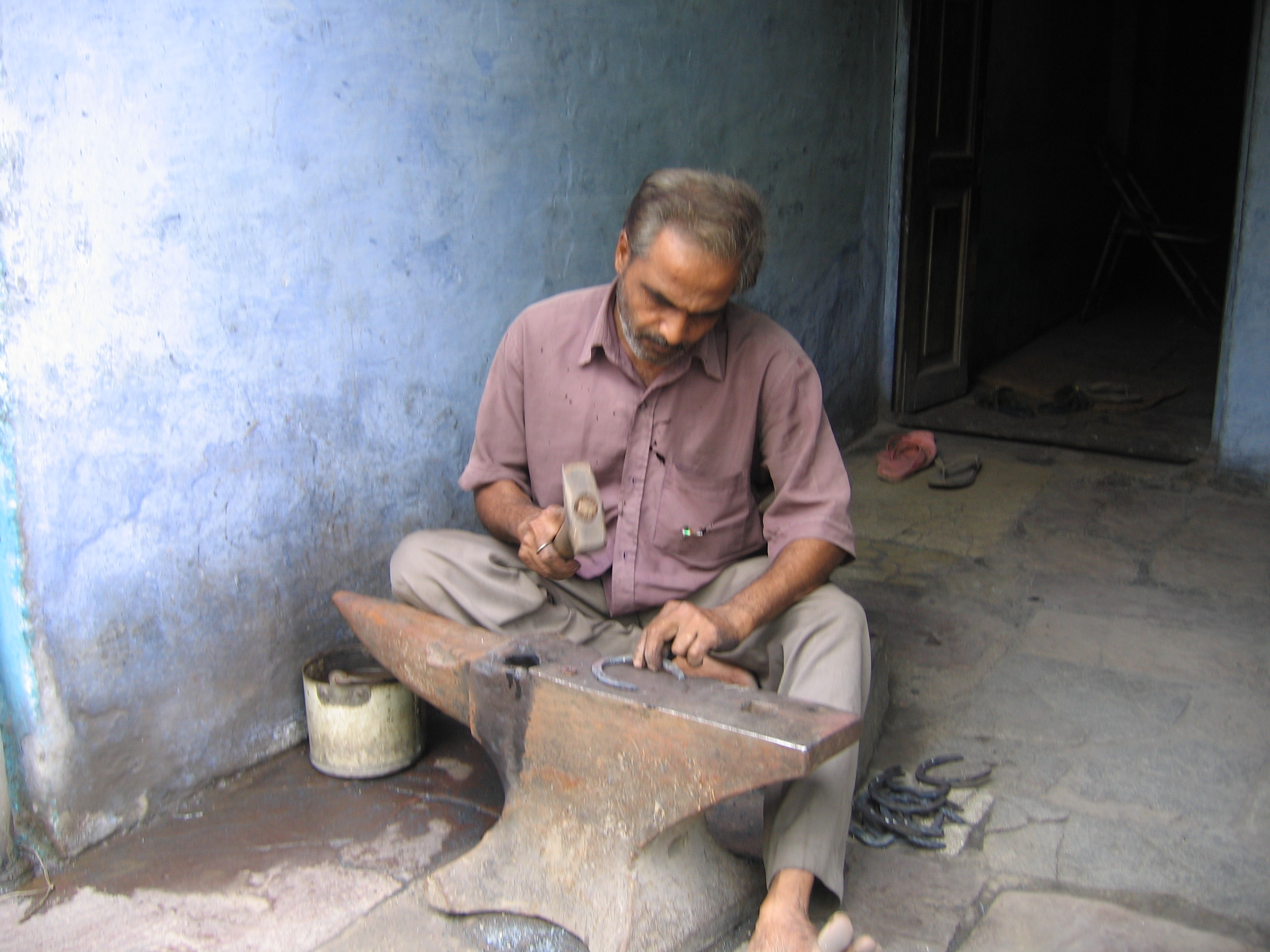
Making horseshoes in India

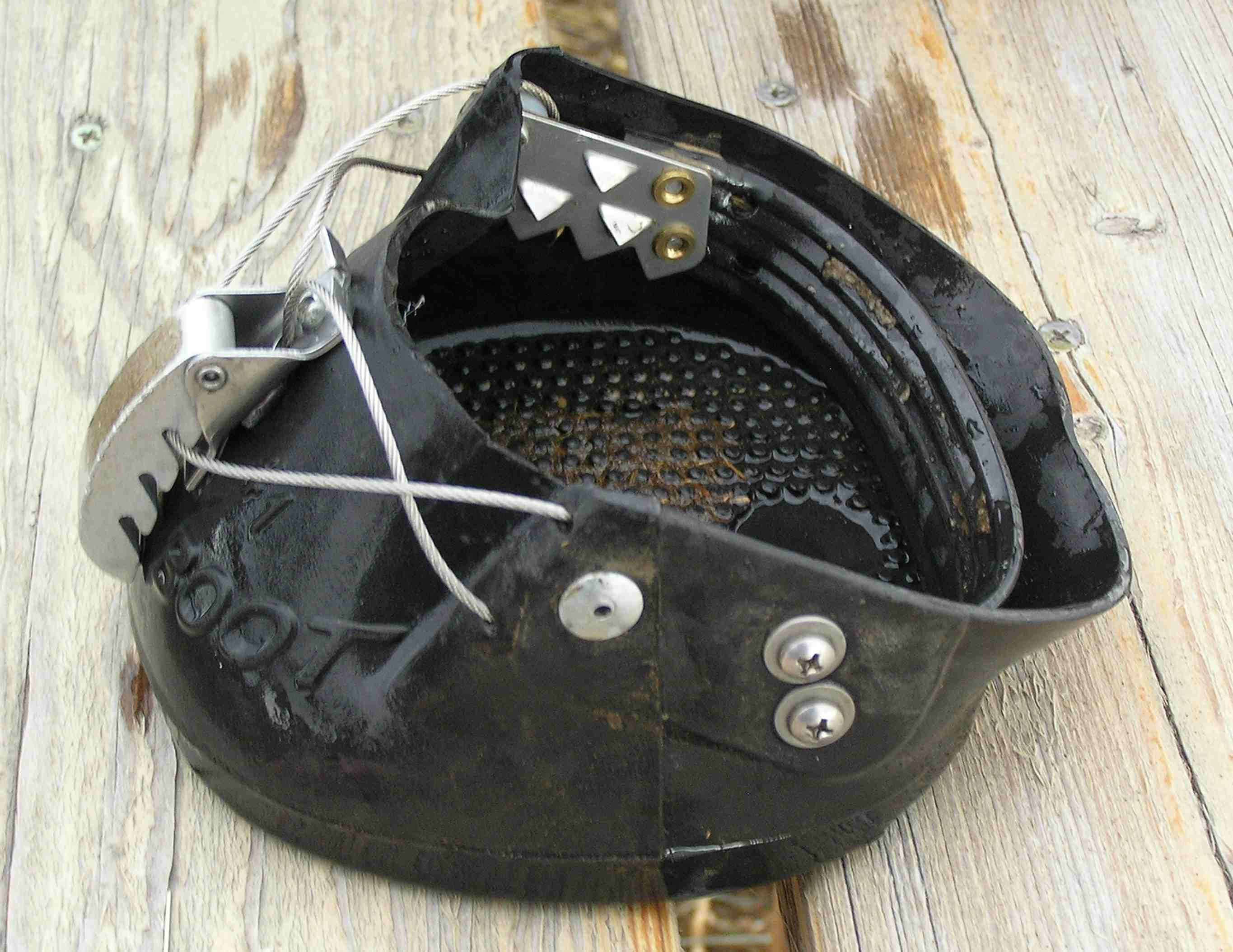
A hoof boot

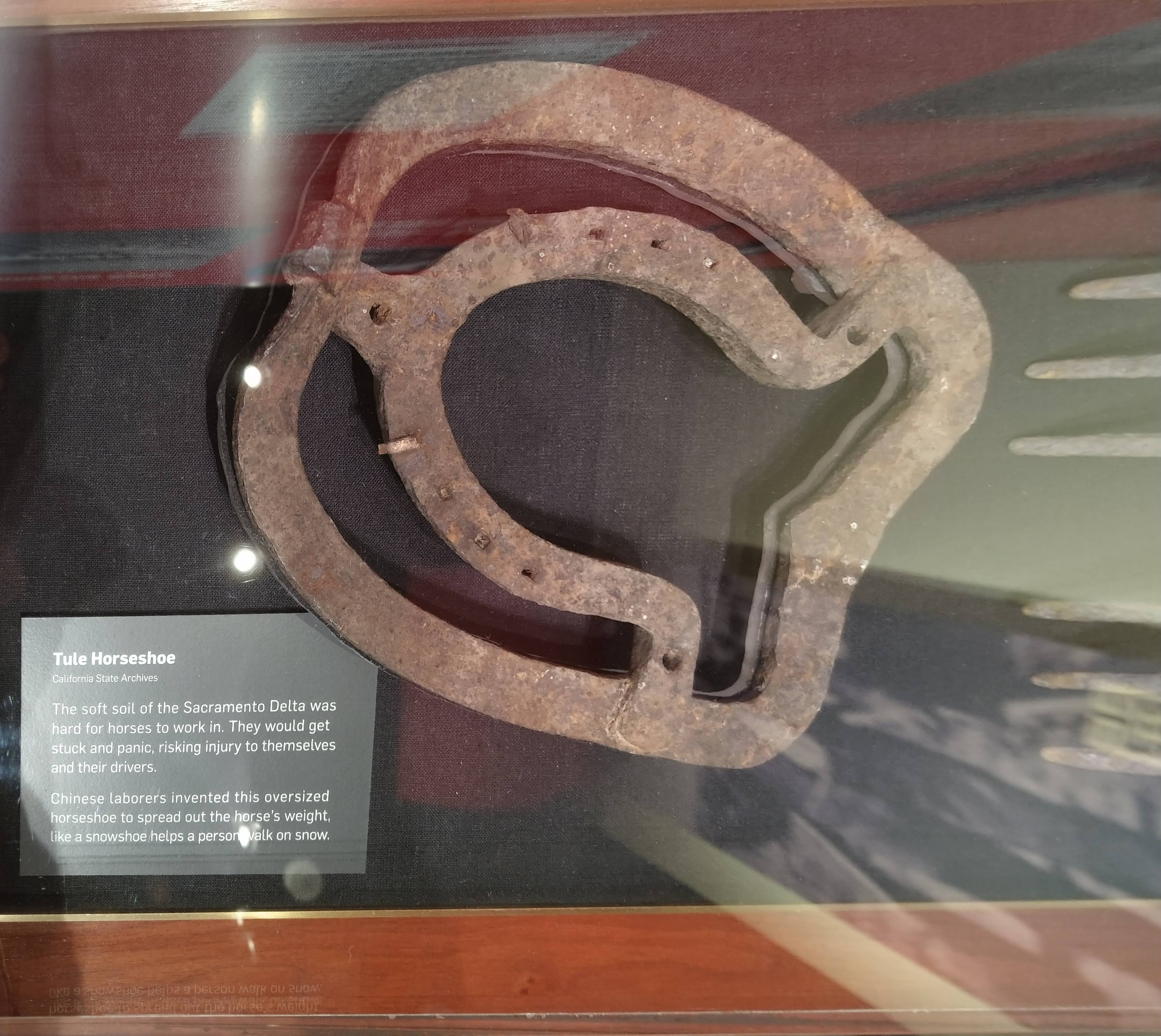
An oversized horseshoe for soft soil to distribute horse's weight

Historians differ on the origin of the horseshoe. Because iron was a valuable commodity, and any worn out items were generally reforged and reused, it is difficult to locate clear archaeological evidence. There is no hard evidence to support the claim that the Druids invented the horse shoe. In 1897 four bronze horseshoes with what are apparently nail holes were found in an Etruscan tomb dated around 400 BC. Catullus (died 54 BC) mentioned "mule shoes," which some historians interpret as evidence that the Romans invented them after 100 BC. However, these references to use of horseshoes and muleshoes in Rome may have been to the "hipposandal"—leather boots, reinforced by an iron plate, rather than to nailed horseshoes. A horseshoe, complete with nails, was found in the tomb of the Frankish King Childeric I at Tournai, Belgium, dated to the fifth century AD.

Existing written references to the nailed shoe are relatively late, first known to have appeared around AD 900. The earliest clear written record of iron horseshoes is a reference to "crescent figured irons and their nails" in AD 910. By 973, occasional written mentions of nailed horseshoes can be found.

Around 1000 AD, cast bronze horseshoes with nail holes became common in Europe. A design with a scalloped outer rim and six nail holes was common. According to Gordon Ward the scalloped edges were created by double punching the nail holes causing the edges to bulge. The 13th and 14th centuries brought the widespread manufacturing of iron horseshoes. By the time of the Crusades (1096–1270), horseshoes were widespread and frequently mentioned in various written sources. In that period, due to the value of iron, horseshoes were even accepted in lieu of coin to pay taxes.

By the 13th century, shoes were forged in large quantities and could be bought ready made. Hot shoeing, the process of shaping a heated horseshoe immediately before placing it on the horse, became common in the 16th century. From the need for horseshoes, the craft of blacksmithing became "one of the great staple crafts of medieval and modern times and contributed to the development of metallurgy." A treatise titled "No Foot, No Horse" was published in England in 1751.

In 1835, the first U.S. patent for a horseshoe manufacturing machine capable of making up to 60 horseshoes per hour was issued to Henry Burden. Another U.S. patent for a "Horshoe-machine" was granted in 1847, without information on the throughput or advantage of the new machine. In mid-19th-century Canada, marsh horseshoes kept horses from sinking into the soft intertidal mud during dike-building. In a common design, a metal horseshoe holds a flat wooden shoe in place.

=== China ===
In China, iron horseshoes became common during the Yuan dynasty (1271–1368), prior to which rattan and leather shoes were used to preserve animal hooves. Evidence of the preservation of horse hooves in China dates to the Warring States period (476–221 BC), during which Zhuangzi recommended shaving horse hooves to keep them in good shape. The Discourses on Salt and Iron in 81 BC mentions using leather shoes, but it is not clear if they were used for protecting horse hooves or to aid in mounting the horse. Remnants of iron horseshoes have been found in what is now northeast China, but the tombs date to the Goguryeo period in 414 AD. A mural in the Mogao Caves dated to 584 AD depicts a man caring for a horse's hoof, which some speculate might be depicting horseshoe nailing, but the mural is too eroded to tell clearly.

The earliest reference to iron horseshoes in China dates to 938 AD during the Five Dynasties and Ten Kingdoms period. A monk named Gao Juhui sent to the Western Regions writes that the people in Ganzhou (now Zhangye) taught him how to make "horse hoof muse", which had four holes in it that connected to four holes in the horse's hoof, and were thus put together. They also recommended using yak skin shoes for camel hooves. Iron horseshoes however did not become common for another three centuries. Zhao Rukuo writes in Zhu Fan Zhi, finished in 1225, that the horses of the Arabs and Persians used metal for horse shoes, implying that horses in China did not. After the establishment of the Yuan dynasty in 1271 AD, iron horseshoes became more common in northern China. When Thomas Blakiston travelled up the Yangtze, he noted that in Sichuan "cattle wore straw shoes to prevent their slipping on the wet ground" while in northern China, "horses and cattle are shod with iron shoes and nails." The majority of Chinese horseshoe discoveries have been in Jilin, Heilongjiang, Liaoning, Sichuan, and Tibet.

== Reasons for use ==
=== Environmental changes linked to domestication ===
Many changes brought about by the domestication of the horse, such as putting them in wetter climates and exercising them less, have led to horses' hooves hardening less and being more vulnerable to injury. In the wild, a horse may travel up to 50 miles (80 km) per day to obtain adequate forage. While horses in the wild cover large areas of terrain, they usually do so at relatively slow speeds, unless being chased by a predator. They also tend to live in arid steppe climates. The consequence of slow but nonstop travel in a dry climate is that horses' feet are naturally worn to a small, smooth, even, and hard state. The continual stimulation of the sole of the foot keeps it thick and hard. However, in domestication, the manner in which horses are used is different. Domesticated horses are brought to colder and wetter areas than their ancestral habitat. These softer and heavier soils soften the hooves and make them prone to splitting, thus making hoof protection necessary.

=== Physical stresses requiring horseshoes ===
- Abnormal stress: Horses' hooves can become quite worn out when subjected to the added weight and stress of a rider, pack load, cart, or wagon.
- Corrective shoeing: The shape, weight, and thickness of a horseshoe can significantly affect the horse's gait. Farriers may forge custom shoes to help horses with bone or muscle problems in their legs, or fit commercially available remedial shoes.
- Traction: Traction devices such as borium for ice, horse shoe studs for muddy or slick conditions, calks, carbide-tipped road nails and rims are useful for performance horses such as eventers, show jumpers, polo ponies, and other horses that perform at high speeds, over changing terrain, or in less-than-ideal footing.
- Gait manipulation: Some breeds such as the Saddlebred, Tennessee Walking Horse, and other gaited horses are judged on their high-stepping movement. Special shoeing can help enhance their natural movement.
- Racing horses with weakness in their foot or leg require specialized horseshoes.

== Horseshoeing theories and debates ==
Domestic horses do not always require shoes. When possible, a "barefoot" hoof, at least for part of every year, is a healthy option for most horses. However, horseshoes have their place and can help prevent excess or abnormal hoof wear and injury to the foot. Many horses go without shoes year round, some using temporary protection such as hoof boots for short-term use.

== Process of shoeing ==
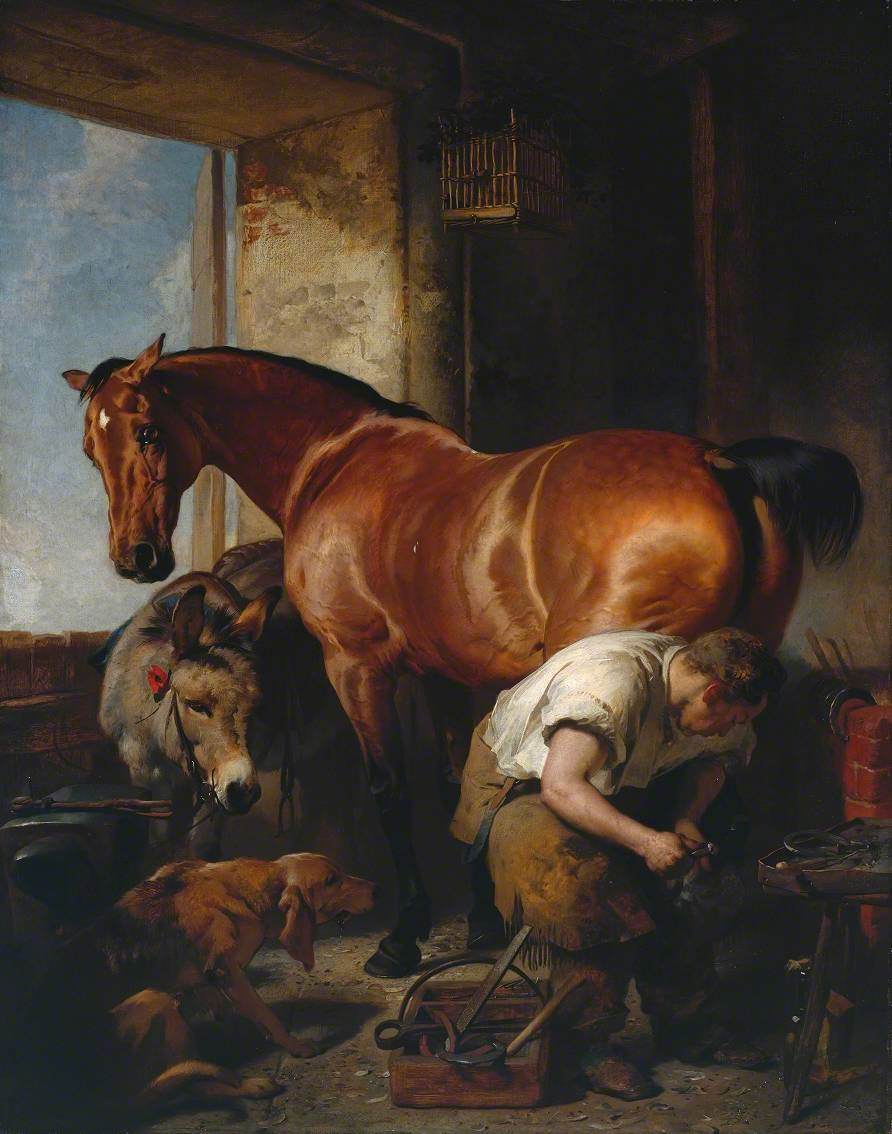
Shoeing by Edwin Landseer, 1844

Shoeing, when performed correctly, causes no pain to the animal. Farriers trim the insensitive part of the hoof, which is the same area into which they drive the nails. This is analogous to a manicure on a human fingernail, only on a much larger scale.

Before beginning to shoe, the farrier removes the old shoe using pincers (shoe pullers) and trims the hoof wall to the desired length with nippers, a sharp pliers-like tool, and the sole and frog of the hoof with a hoof knife. Shoes do not allow the hoof to wear down as it naturally would in the wild, and it can then become too long. The coffin bone inside the hoof should line up straight with both bones in the pastern. If the excess hoof is not trimmed, the bones will become misaligned, which would place stress on the legs of the animal.

Shoes are then measured to the foot and bent to the correct shape using a hammer, anvil, forge, and other modifications, such as taps for shoe studs, are added. Farriers may either cold shoe, in which they bend the metal shoe without heating it, or hot shoe, in which they place the metal in a forge before bending it. Hot shoeing can be more time-consuming, and requires the farrier to have access to a forge; however, it usually provides a better fit, as the mark made on the hoof from the hot shoe can show how even it lies. It also allows the farrier to make more modifications to the shoe, such as drawing toe- and quarter-clips. The farrier must take care not to hold the hot shoe against the hoof too long, as the heat can damage the hoof.

Hot shoes are placed in water to cool them. The farrier then nails the shoes on by driving the nails into the hoof wall at the white line of the hoof. The nails are shaped in such a way that they bend outward as they are driven in, avoiding the sensitive inner part of the foot, so they emerge on the sides of the hoof. When the nail has been completely driven, the farrier cuts off the sharp points and uses a clincher (a form of tongs made especially for this purpose) or a clinching block with hammer to bend the rest of the nail so it is almost flush with the hoof wall. This prevents the nail from getting caught on anything, and also helps to hold the nail, and therefore the shoe, in place.

The farrier then uses a rasp (large file), to smooth the edge where it meets the shoe and eliminate any sharp edges left from cutting off the nails.

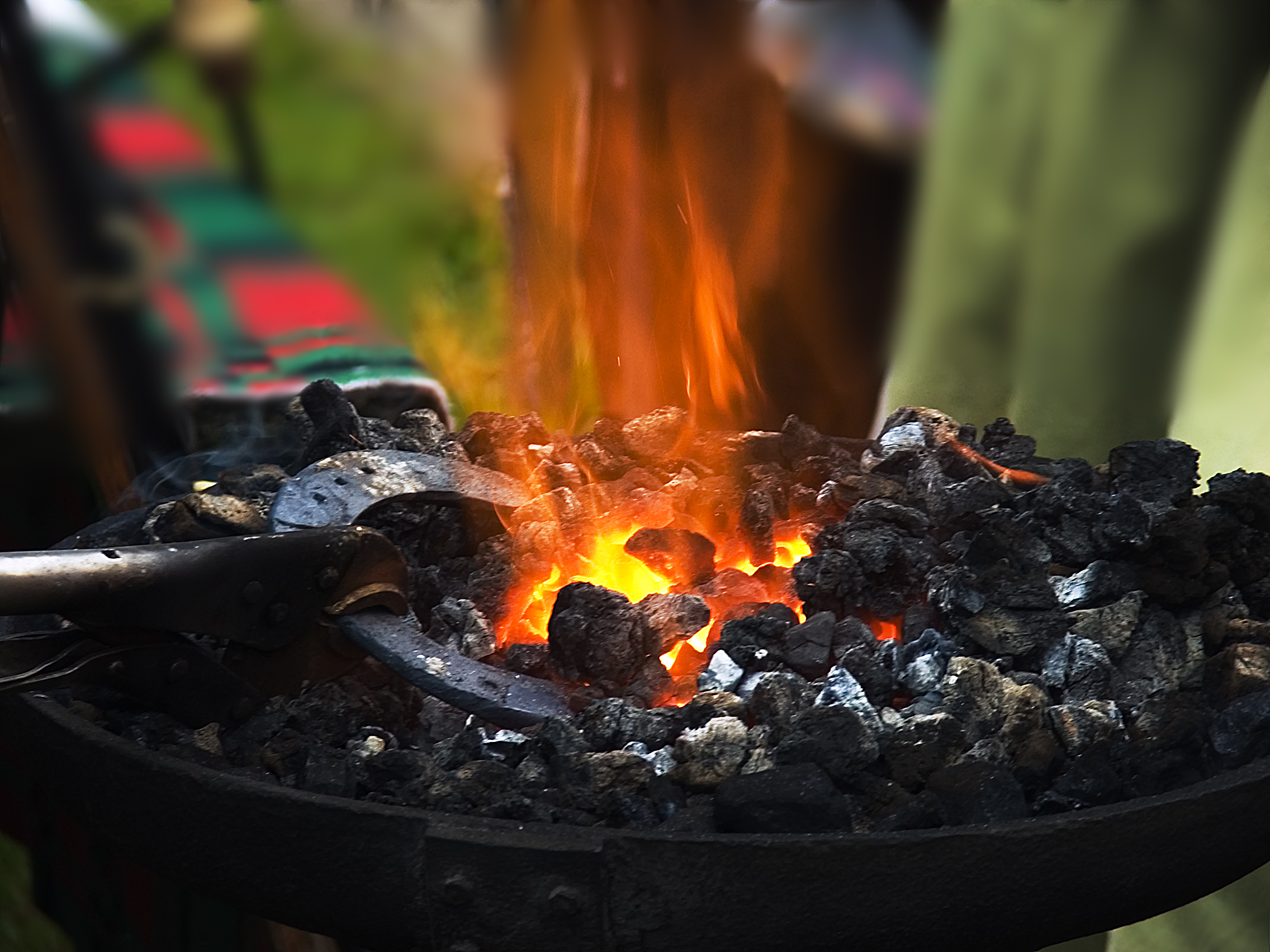
A hot horseshoe in a forge

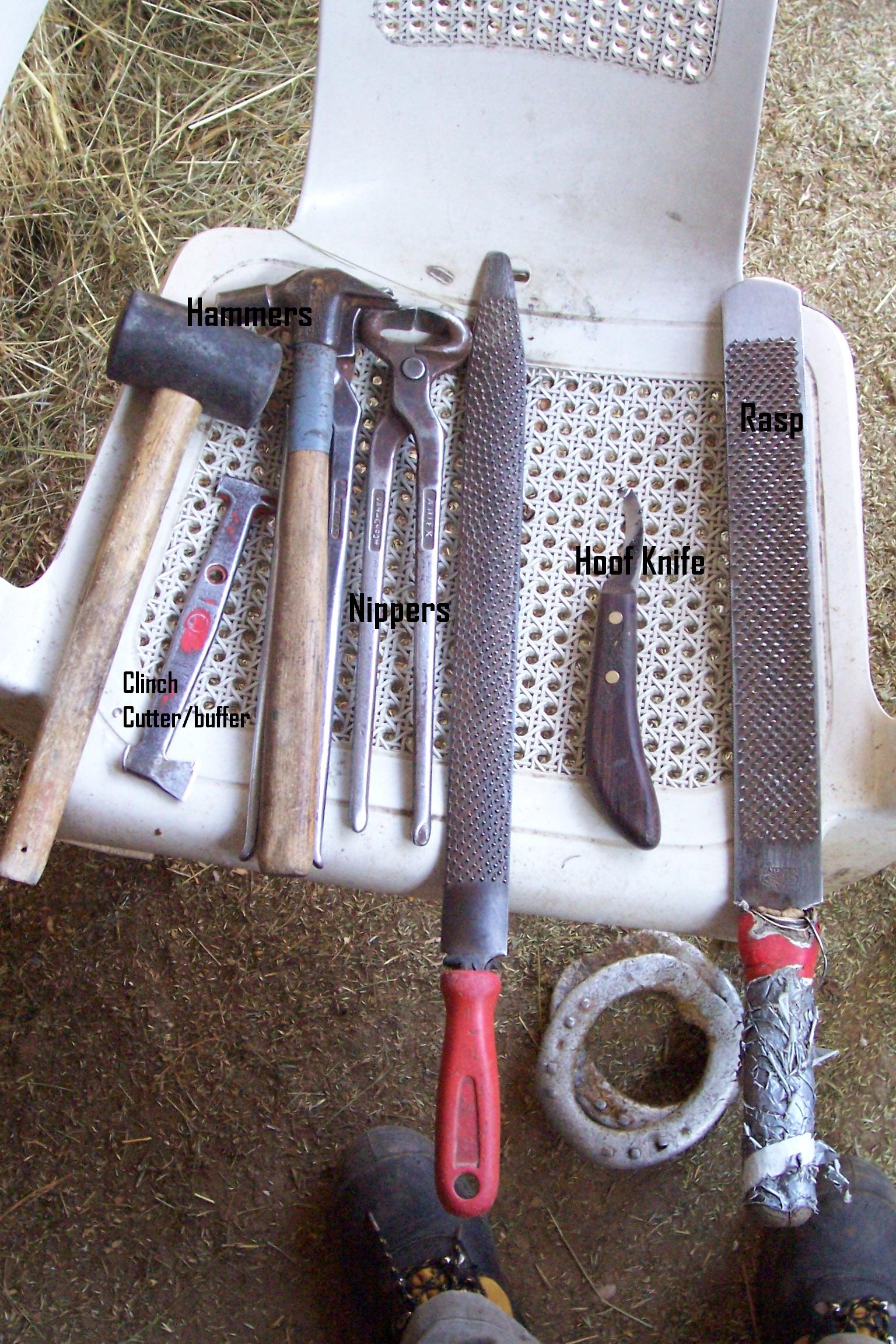
Farrier tools

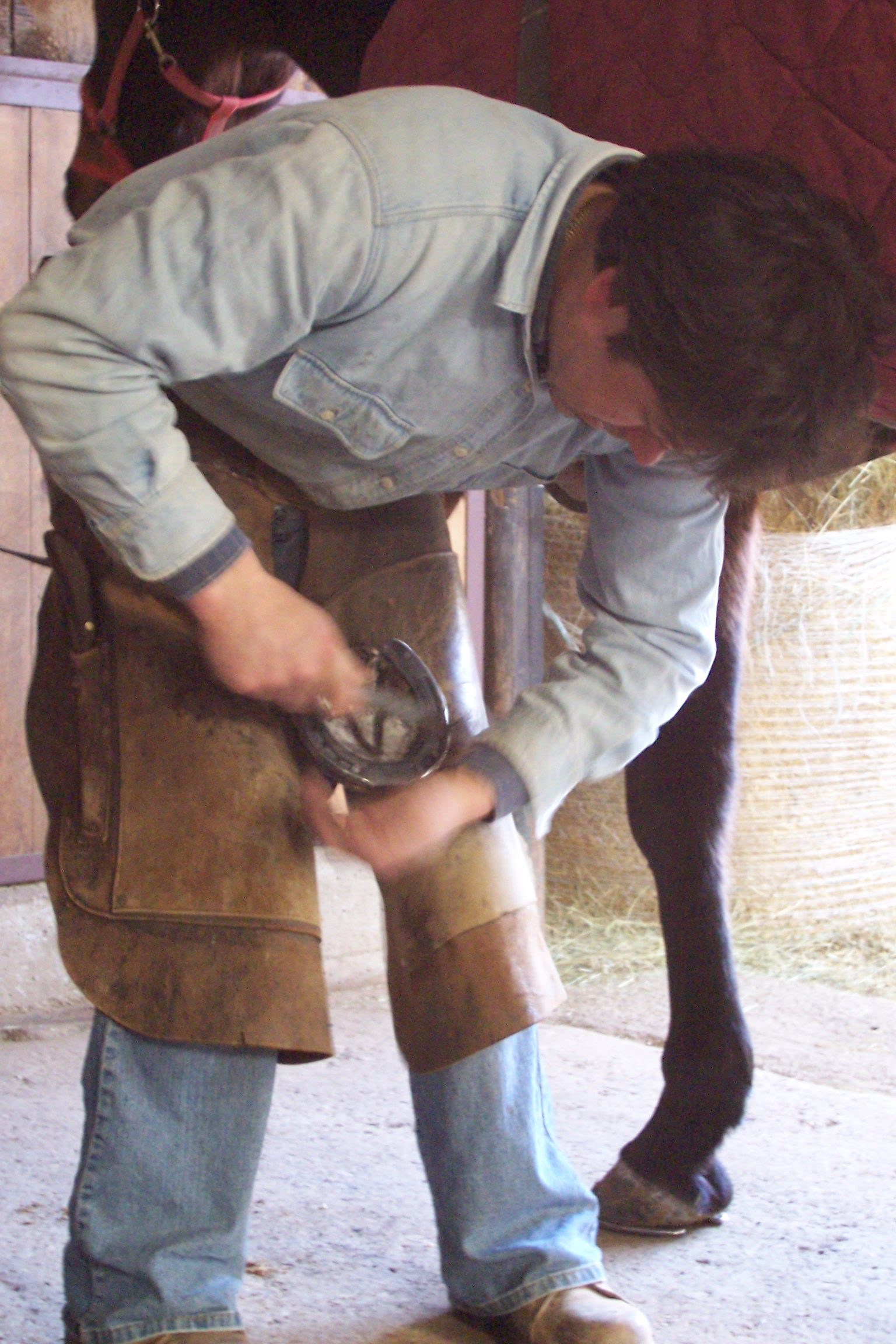
Nailing on the shoe

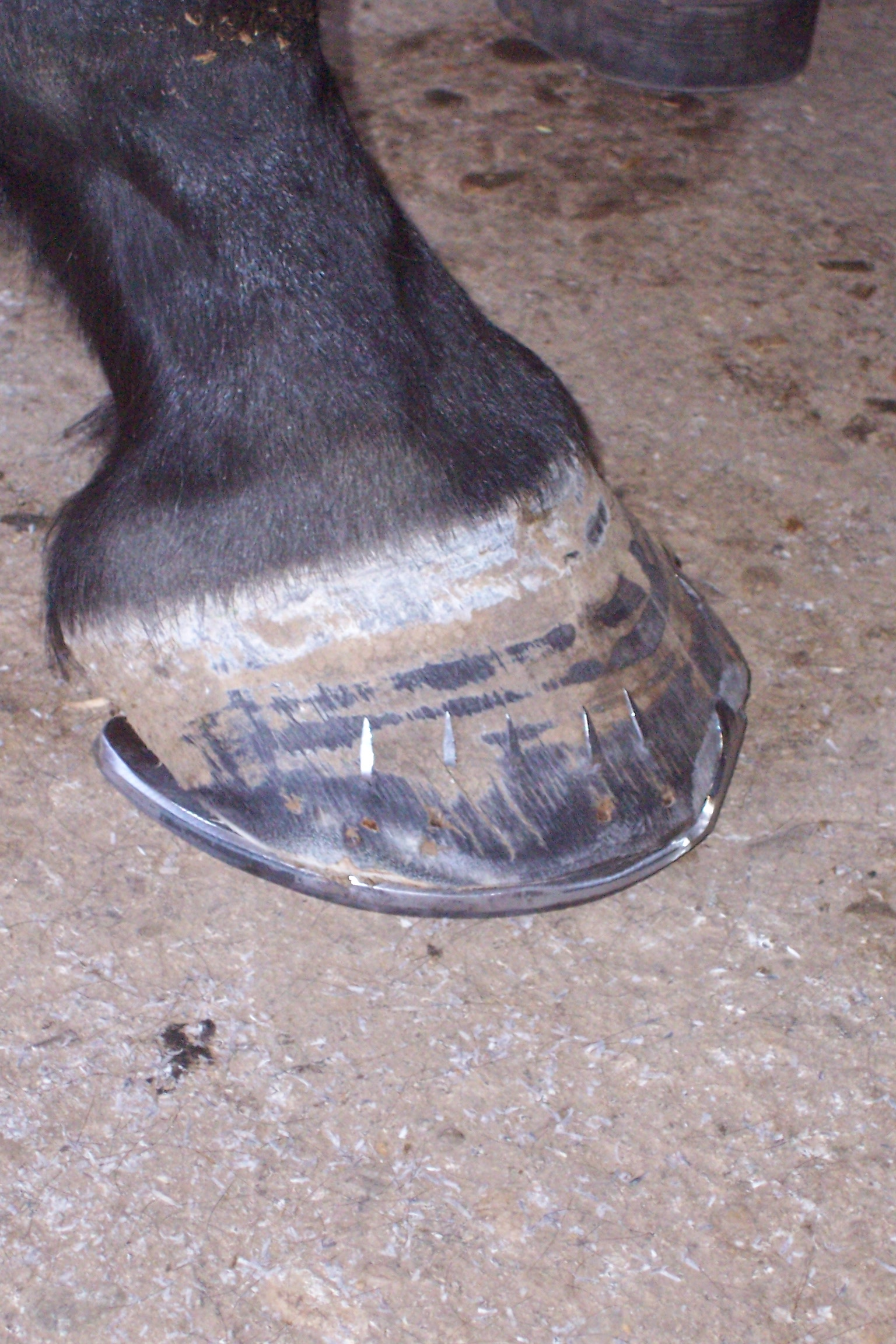
The nails driven through the hoof, but not yet bent downwards

== In culture ==
=== Superstition ===
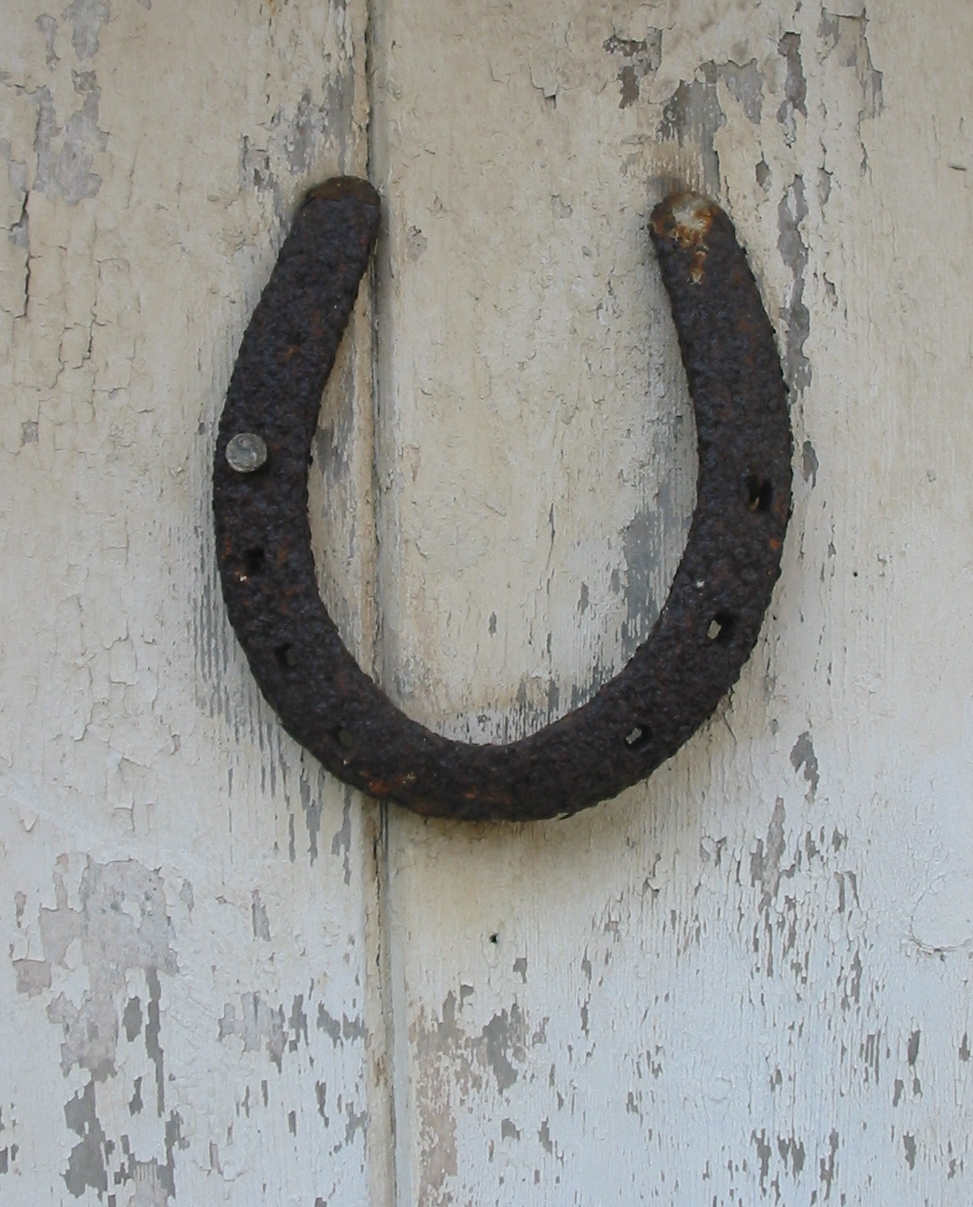
A horseshoe on a door is regarded as a protective talisman in some cultures.

Horseshoes have long been considered lucky or fortuitous. They were originally made of iron, a material that was believed to ward off evil spirits, and traditionally were held in place with seven nails, seven being the luckiest number.

The tradition of using worn horseshoes as protective charms dates back to Europe, where they were often placed above or beside doorways. This practice aimed to guard homes, barns, and stables, and remnants of this custom can still be seen across regions like Italy, Germany, Britain, and Scandinavia. Horseshoe-shaped wall decorations are also common. In the Middle East, blue-glazed terra cotta horseshoe plaques are widely used, while in Turkey, metal or blue glass horseshoes are combined with the "all-seeing eye" to create distinctive protective talismans believed to ward off the evil eye.

Opinion is divided as to which way up the horseshoe ought to be nailed. In much of Europe, the Middle East, and Latin America, it is typically hung facing downward, symbolising the pouring of blessings or protection as it allows good fortune to flow onto those passing beneath. However, in parts of Ireland and Britain, an upward orientation is preferred, based on the belief that it catches luck and prevents it from "running out." These differing traditions were carried to the United States, where those of English and Irish heritage often hang horseshoes upward, while French, German, Italian, Spanish, and Balkan influences favor a downward position.

Despite these differences in interpretation, the horseshoe's true primary purpose is to serve as a protective charm, regardless of its orientation, rather than merely a luck-catching device.

The superstition acquired a further Christian twist due to a legend surrounding the tenth-century saint Dunstan, who worked as a blacksmith before becoming Archbishop of Canterbury. The legend recounts that, one day, the Devil walked into Dunstan's shop and asked him to shoe his horse. Dunstan pretended not to recognize him, and agreed to the request; but rather than nailing the shoe to the horse's hoof, he nailed it to the Devil's own foot, causing him great pain. Dunstan eventually agreed to remove the shoe, but only after extracting a promise that the Devil would never enter a household with a horseshoe nailed to the door.

In the tale of Saint Dunstan, it appears that hanging a horseshoe with the open end facing downward is the most accurate interpretation. This is suggested by a passage from the story:

He will not through Granāda march,
For there he knows the horse-shoe arch
At every gate attends him.
Nor partridges can he digest,
Since the dire horse-shoe on the breast,
Most grievously offends him.

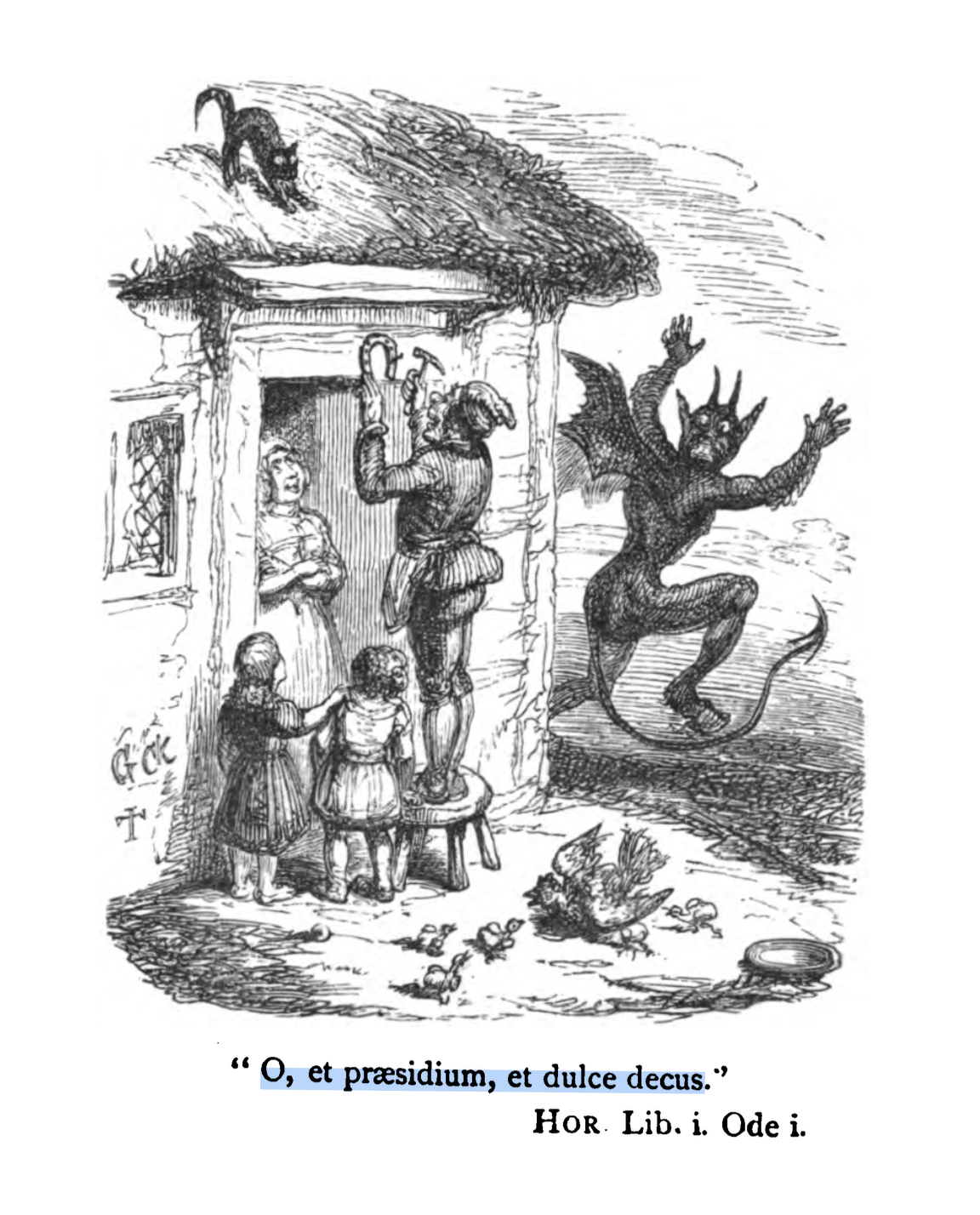

The mention of the "horse-shoe arch" likely refers to a horseshoe with its open ends facing downward, consistent with the illustrations found throughout the tale.

Blacksmiths and Horseshoes also have a connection. Blacksmiths themselves were historically considered lucky and revered for their craft, as they worked with fire and iron, both seen as powerful and protective elements. Their association with luck extended to the horseshoes they forged, which became symbols of protection and good fortune. Blacksmiths often hung horseshoes with the ends pointing down, believing this orientation would allow blessings and luck to pour onto their work.

=== Heraldry ===
In heraldry, horseshoes most often occur as canting charges, such as in the arms of families with names like Farrier, Marshall, and Smith. A horseshoe (together with two hammers) also appears in the arms of Hammersmith and Fulham, a borough in London.

Flag of Rutland

The flag of Rutland, England's smallest historic county, consists of a golden horseshoe laid over a field scattered with acorns. This refers to an ancient tradition in which every noble visiting Oakham, Rutland's county town, presents a horseshoe to the Lord of the Manor, which is then nailed to the wall of Oakham Castle. Over the centuries, the Castle has amassed a vast collection of horseshoes, the oldest of which date from the 15th century.

=== Monuments and structures ===
A massive golden horseshoe structure is erected over the shopping mall of the Tuuri village in Alavus, a town of Finland. It is one of the most famous monuments in the locality; however, it stands at number three in Reuters' list of world's ugliest buildings and monuments.

=== Sport ===
The sport of horseshoes involves a horseshoe being thrown as close as possible to a rod in order to score points. As far as it is known, the sport is as old as horseshoes themselves. While traditional horseshoes can still be used, most organized versions of the game use specialized sport horseshoes, which do not fit on horses' hooves.

== See also ==
- Farrier
- Horse care
- Horse hoof
- Laminitis
- Natural hoof care
