= Jaime Jackson =

American author and researcher

Jaime Jackson (born 1947) is a former farrier and author of many books focused around natural horse care and natural hoof care as well as other non-fiction books. He is best known for his research of the wild, free-roaming horses in the U.S. Great Basin in 1982-86. His first book on horses The Natural Horse: Lessons from the Wild (1992) describes what we know today as the wild horse model. Based on research and findings of the U.S. wild horse populations at Litchfield BLM Corrals the Natural Trim Method was developed. His greatest innovation Paddock Paradise natural boarding system is revolutionising horse management around the world. Published in 2005, "Paddock Paradise: A Guide to Natural Horse Boarding" became a foundation for the alternative boarding system also known as Track System.

== Career ==
The Natural Horse was based upon Jackson's studies from 1982 until 1986 of the Mustang in its natural environment in the Great Basin of the western United States. Jackson discovered that not only did wild horses live longer than domestic horses, but they also suffered none of the hoof maladies that plague those kept in 'captivity', notably navicular syndrome and laminitis. Following his research, he began experimenting on the hooves of domestic horses to find an effective way to trim their feet and allow them to remain barefoot and strong. In 1990 he stopped all shoeing of horses and instead began to advocate for the wild-horse trim. He believed that even horses with severe hoof conditions deemed incurable by veterinarians and farriers could, over time, be restored to good health through barefoot trimming and natural horse care (i.e., naturalization of the diet and boarding situation).

In the early 2000s, Jackson created the American Association of Natural Hoof Care Practitioners (AANHCP), a non-profit organization devoted to education, training and certification of the natural hoof care practitioner. Since then, the organization has expanded its scope and has changed its name to the Association for the Advancement of Natural Horse Care Practices. Jackson is its executive director.

In 2009 Jamie Jackson established another organisation called Institute for the Study of Natural Horse Care Practices known as ISNHCP. The organisation aims to provide education on genuine Natural Hoof Care based on the Wild Horse Model.

The guiding principles to Natural Hoof Care, according to Jackson, are:

1. Leave that which should be there naturally.
2. Take only that which should be worn away naturally in the wild.
3. Allow to grow that which should be there naturally but is not due to unnatural forces.
4. Ignore all pathology.

Within a few years, a large, worldwide barefoot movement formed to promote the healthy benefits of barefootedness and natural horse care. According to veterinarian Robert Cook, Professor of Surgery Emeritus at Cummings School of Veterinary Medicine at Tufts University in Massachusetts, Jackson provided "indisputable evidence, available for more than a decade, disproving the claim that domesticated horses need shoes."

Jackson's book, Paddock Paradise: A Guide to Natural Boarding (2006), further advances the concept of using natural horse care to restore and maintain optimal health.

Jackson has moved away from client work, his efforts are now directed into further written work, consultations, and the training programme known more by its acronym ISNHCP.

== Paddock Paradise and natural boarding ==
This natural horse boarding concept was introduced by Jackson in his book, Paddock Paradise, A Guide to Natural Horse Boarding (Star Ridge Publishing). The premise of this boarding model is to provide safe, humane living conditions that use the horse's natural instincts, and thus to stimulate and facilitate movement and other behaviors that are essential to a biodynamically sound horse.

Jackson concluded from his studies based on the behavior of wild horses, that domesticated horses appear thrive physically, mentally and emotionally if kept in an environment that takes into consideration the most basic elements of their natural world by situating and propelling them into forward movement. According to Jackson, who founded the American Association of Natural Hoof Care Practitioners (AANHCP) in 2002, the hoof is adaptively cross-linked to the nexus of natural behavior and movement and can be restored to its native integrity and soundness by putting horses in such a simulated natural environment.

The paddock paradise model is unlike a traditional situation with stalls, small paddocks and/or lush green pastures (which Jackson calls "founder traps"). It is designed to encourage movement through the creation of a series of fenced paths with a quantity of various stimuli such as strategically placed feeding spots and watering holes that are incorporated within or alongside the track in order to activate curiosity or movement. Natural horse care practices include elements of natural hoof care, encouraging herd mentality, foraging for small amounts of food strategically available throughout the day, maintaining a watering hole near or at the source of drinking water, and behaviors related to horses as prey animals, relative dominance (pecking order), grooming, resting and sleeping behaviors.

== See also ==
- Natural hoof care

== Bibliography ==
Equine Books

- The Natural Horse: Lessons From The Wild, J. Jackson, Northland Publishing, 1992, Star Ridge Company ISBN 0-9658007-0-9
- Horse Owners Guide to Natural Hoof Care, J. Jackson, Star Ridge Company ISBN 0-9658007-6-8
- Founder: Prevention & Cure the Natural Way, J.Jackson, Star Ridge Company ISBN 0-9658007-3-3
- Guide to Booting Horses for Hoof Care Professionals, J. Jackson, Star Ridge Company ISBN 0-9658007-2-5
- The Natural Trim: Principles & Practice (Formerly Known as: Official Trimming Guidelines of the AANHCP), J. Jackson, 2006 ISBN 0-9848399-0-9
- Paddock Paradise, J. Jackson, Star Ridge Company, 2007 ISBN 0-9658007-8-4
- The Natural Trim: Principles and Practice, J. Jackson, J Jackson Publishing, 2012 ISBN 0984839909
- Laminitis: An Equine Plague of unconscionable Proportions, James Jackson Publishing, 2016, ISBN 978-0984839933
- Training Manual: ISNHCP Natural Trim Training Program, NHC Press, 2017, ISBN 978-0984839957
- The Hoof Balancer: A Unique Tool for Balancing Equine Hooves (2019) NHC Press, ISBN 978-0984839964
- The Natural Trim: Basic Guidelines, James Jackson Publishing, 2019 ISBN 978-0999730522
- The Natural Trim: Advanced Guidelines, James Jackson Publishing, 2019, ISBN 978-0999730515
- Navicular Syndrome, Healing and Prevention Using the Principles and Practices of Natural Horse Care Based on the U.S. Great Basin Wild Horse Model James Jackson Publishing, 2021, ISBN 978-1735535814

Other Books

- The Canvas Tipi – How to Make and Pitch Your Own Canvas Tipi, Lodgepole Press, 1982
- Guard Your Teeth: Why the Dental Industry Fails Us, A Guide to Natural Dental Care, James Jackson Publishing, 2018 ISBN 978-1733309448
- Buckskin Tanner: A Guide to Natural Hide Tanning, James Jackson Publishing, 2019, ISBN 978-0999730560
- Cheyenne Tipi Notes (1903): Technical Insights Into 19th Century Plains Indian Bison Hide Tanning, 2019, ISBN 978-1733309400
- Living Behind the Facade: Memoirs Of a Gay Man's Journey Through the 20th Century, 2019, George Somers with Jaime Jackson, James Jackson Publishing, ISBN 978-1733309424
- Platform: A Humanitarian Model For An Egalitarian Society, James Jackson Publishing, 2019, ASIN B081QSG5GM
- Zoo Paradise: A New Model for Humane Zoological Gardens, James Jackson Publishing, 2019, ISBN 978-0999730584
