= Hoof boot =

Device designed to cover and protect a horse's hoof

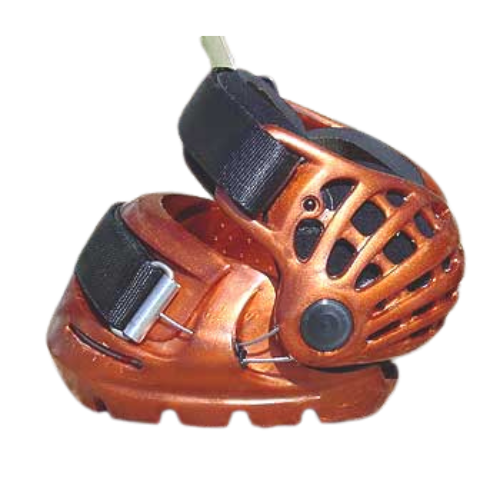
A Renegade Hoof Boot Classic is an example of a hoof boot for horses.

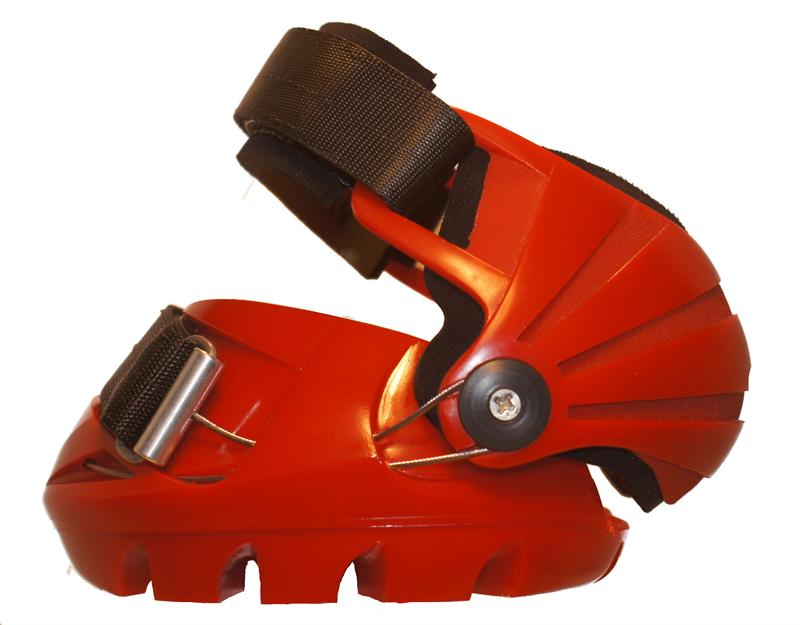
Renegade Hoof Boots Viper Model is another example of a hoof boot for horses.

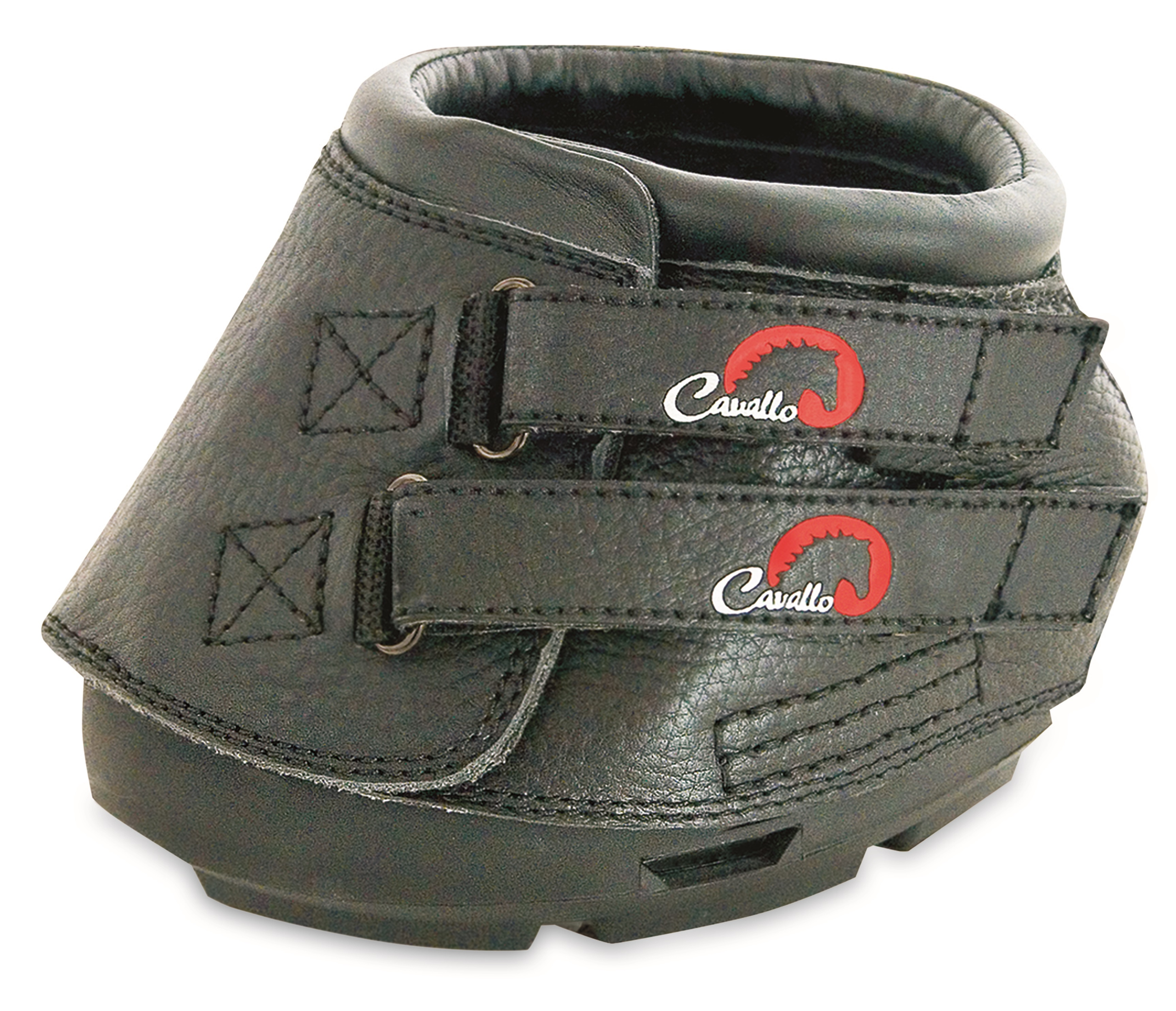
Cavallo Simple Hoof Boot

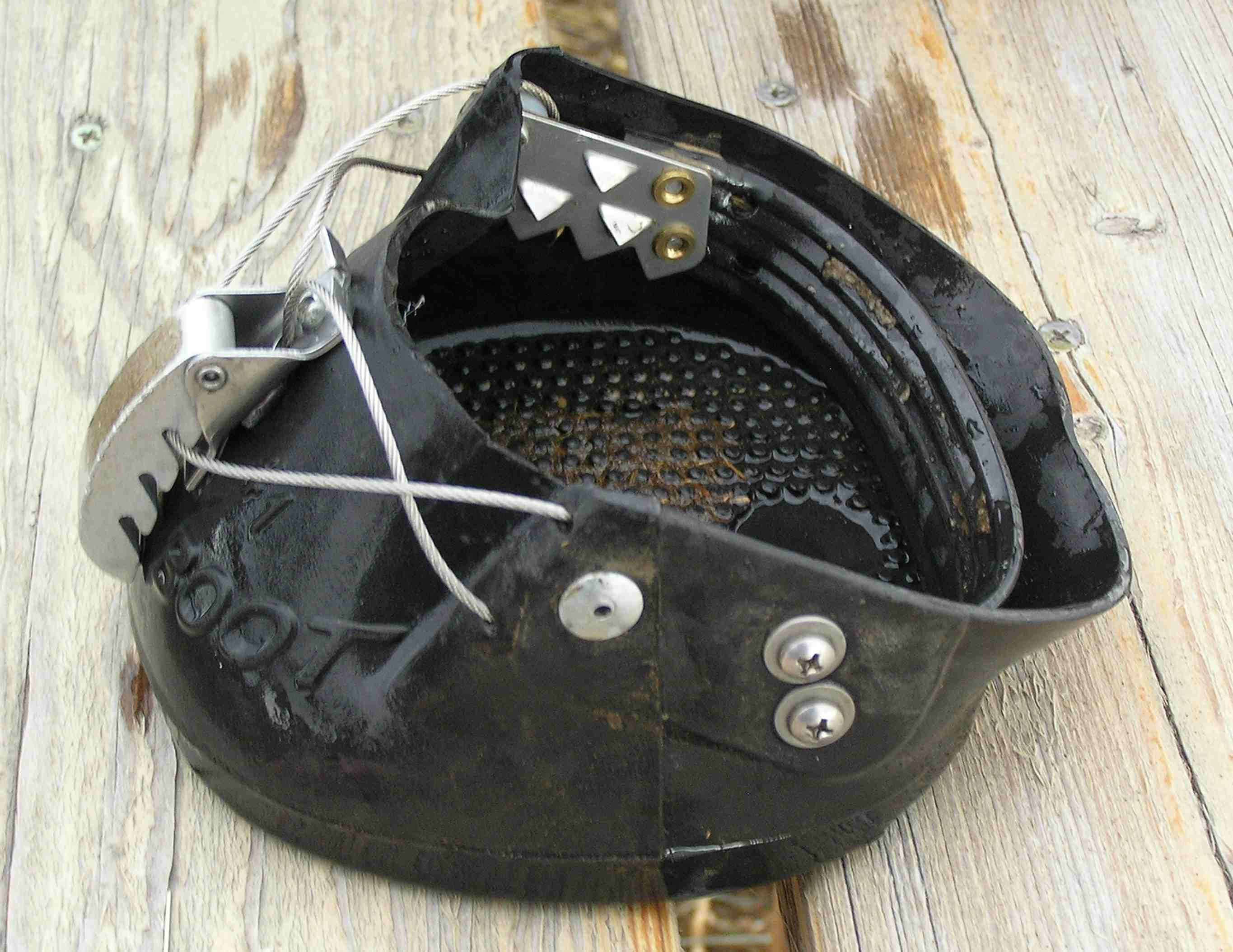
Easyboot hoof boot

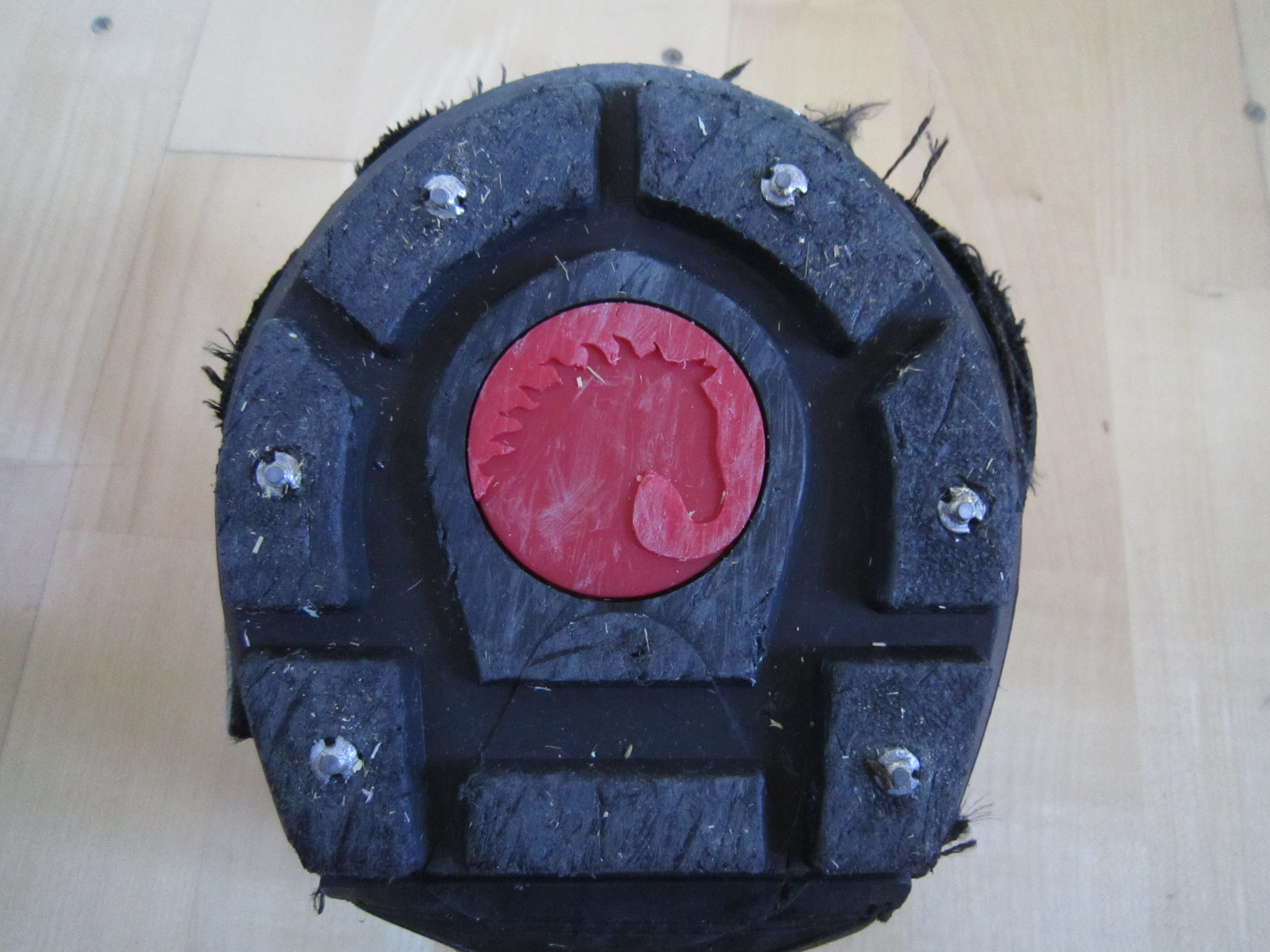
Underside of a hoof boot with studs screwed into the sole

A hoof boot is a device made primarily of polyurethane and is designed to cover the hooves of a horse as an alternative to, and occasionally in addition to, horseshoes. Hoof boots can also be used as a protective device when the animal has a hoof injury that requires protection of the sole of the hoof, or to aid in the application of medication. There are many different designs, but all have the goal of protecting the hoof wall and sole of the horse's hoof from hard surfaces, rocks and other difficult terrain.

Hoof boots are commonly seen as a substitute to horseshoes, either as a backup for a thrown shoe when a farrier is not available, or as an alternative form of hoof protection for a barefoot horse. Horse boots are used in all riding disciplines and are particularly popular for trail riding and endurance riding. They are also used on horses in parades and on police horses who work on hard pavement. Hoof boots may also be used when transitioning a horse from shod to unshod riding, or carried during a ride in case a horse throws a shoe. In areas with persistently slippery conditions in winter, hoof boots are often used in combination with studs screwed into the soles. This allows the horse to be ridden safely on slippery surfaces. This must be done with a hoof boot with a sufficiently thick and inflexible sole to avoid bruising of the hoof sole. Boots with soles that are too flexible are unsuitable for studding.

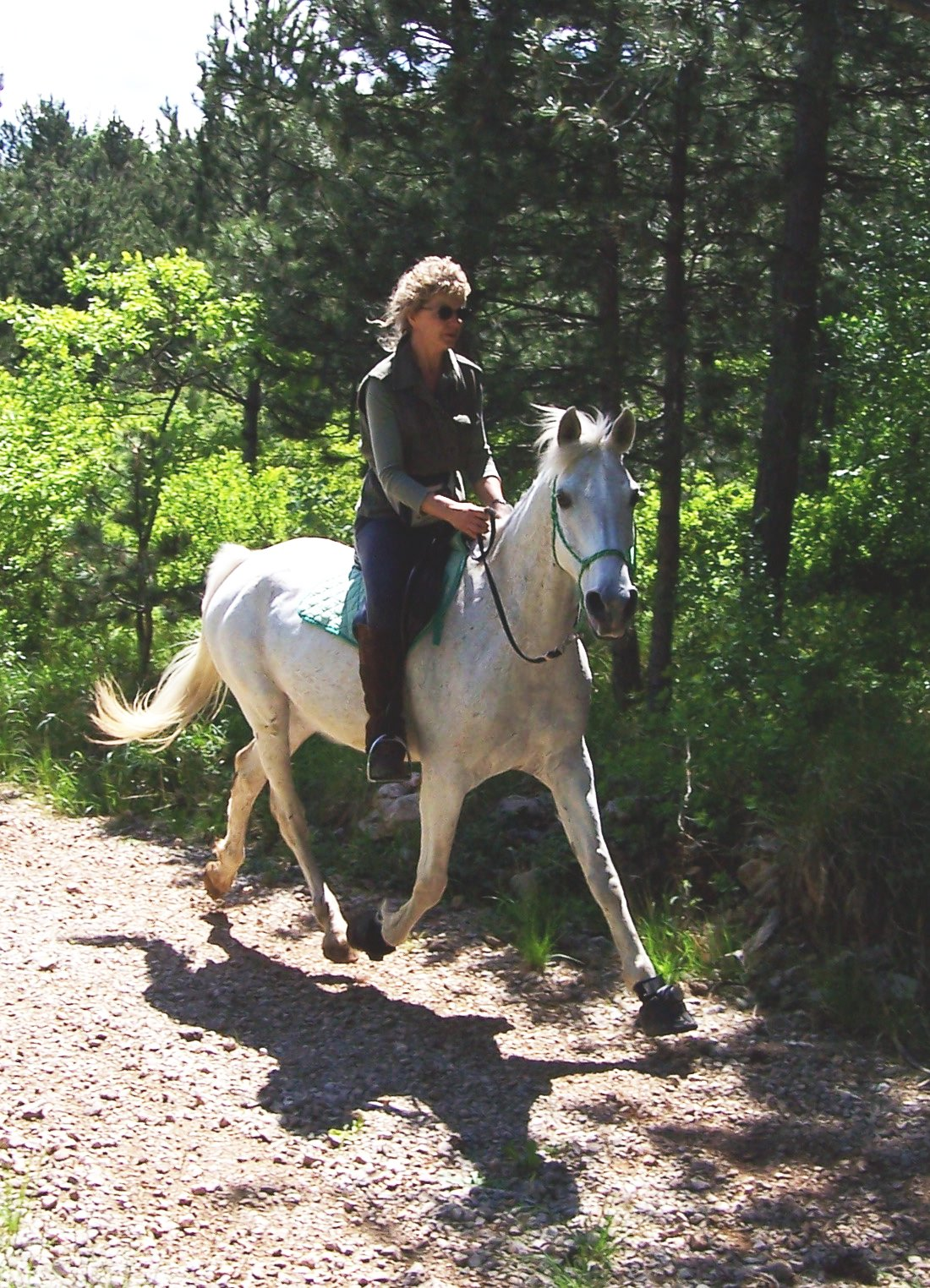
A horse with hoof boots on its front hooves

The other major use of horse boots is for veterinary medicine. If a horse has a puncture wound in the hoof or a bruise to the sole, the boot provides protection to the wound or injury, increases the cleanliness of the area, and may at times be used to keep a poultice or other medication in contact with the hoof. They are also very useful for protection of the hooves of horses who cannot for some reason wear horseshoes, such as a horse that has lost a large chunk of the hoof wall due to disease or injury. In many cases, horses with laminitis also respond well to the protection of hoof boots while their hooves recover.

As a general rule, hoof boots are not kept on horses full-time, rather they are put on and taken off as needed. Riding horses have their boots removed daily at the end of the ride. In the case of horses with injuries, they may be kept on for longer periods of time, but need to be periodically removed and cleaned, after which the boot may be replaced. The horse should be checked for rubbing or unusual abrasions.
