= Hipposandal =

Horse hoof protector

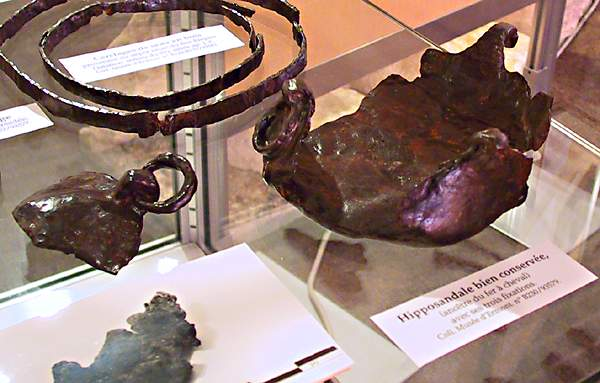
A hipposandal on display at the Musee d'Ermont, France

Schematics of the hipposandal

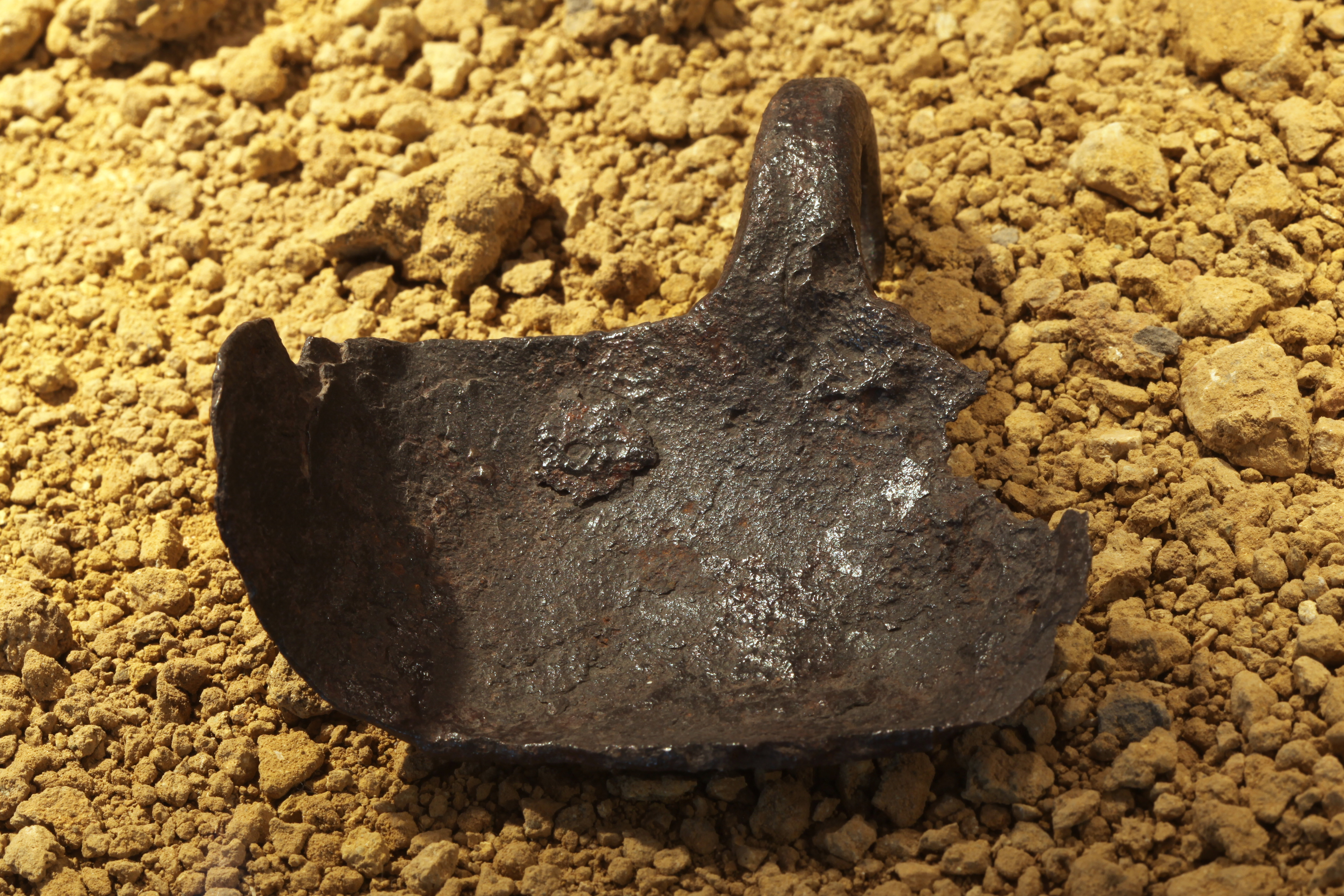
Hipposandal, on display at Vidy Roman Museum

The hipposandal (Latin solea ferrea, singular) is a device that protected the hoof of a horse. It was commonplace in the northwestern countries of the Roman Empire, and was a predecessor to the horseshoe.

The necessity of protecting the horse hoof was recognised by the ancient Greeks and Romans, and written about by Xenophon. An early form of hoof protection was seen in ancient Asia, where horses' hooves were wrapped in rawhide, leather or other materials for both therapeutic purposes and protection from wear. Elsewhere, various methods were employed to trim the hoof into a hollow form and give it as much hardness as possible. Gradually, protection items started to appear, first with the soleae Sparteae, a sort of hoof boot made from esparto grass.

The hipposandal, which appears in the Celtic-Roman area north of the Alps around the mid-1st century AD, was the next step in the development of hoof protection, where the sole of the boot was made of metal. It included an oval-shaped cup of thick metal that enclosed and protected the hoof, complete with a fixation system. The device was fastened to the hoof by metallic clips and leather laces. Like the soleae Sparteae, the hipposandal increased ground adherence of draught animals, thereby giving them better traction, and protected the hoof on rough ground. To further improve traction, the bottom of each hipposandal was grooved.

There is speculation that the Gauls were the first to nail on metal horseshoes. The nailed iron horseshoe first clearly appeared in the archaeological record in Europe in about the 5th century AD when a horseshoe, complete with nails, was found in the tomb of the Frankish King Childeric I at Tournai, Belgium. In Gallo-Roman countries, the hipposandal appears to have briefly co-existed with the nailed horseshoe.

In 2006, Channel Four's history programme Time Team featured an episode where hipposandals were recreated and tested; however, they were reported to have been uncomfortable and unsuitable for long journeys.
