= Nail prick =

Shoeing injury in horses

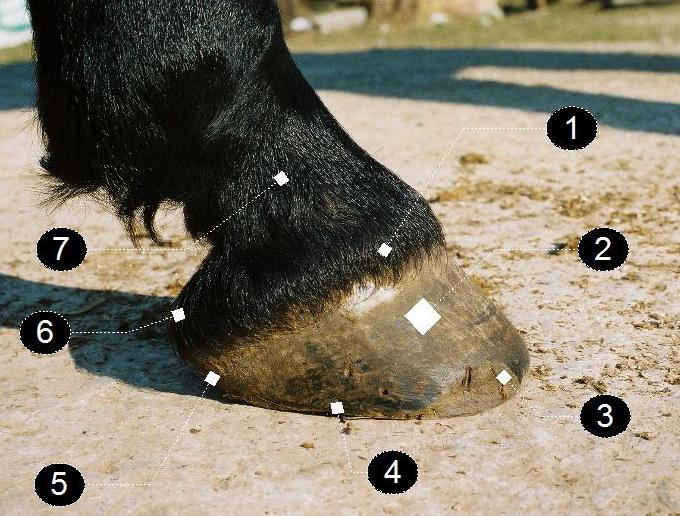
Barefoot hoof, lateral view. Coronet band (1), walls (2), toe (3), quarter (4), heel (5), bulb (6), P2 (small pastern) (7)

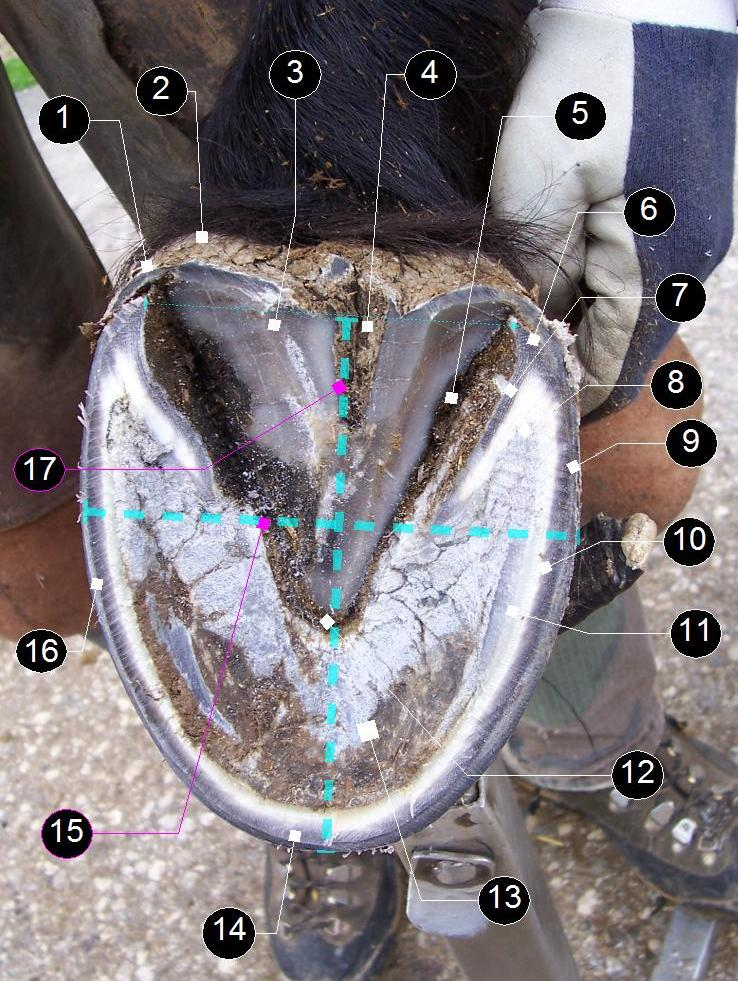
Transitioning barefoot hoof, from below. Details: heel perioplium (1), bulb (2), frog (3), central groove (4), collateral groove (5), heel (6), bar (7), seat of corn (8), pigmented walls (external layer) (9), water line (inner layer) (10), white line (11), apex of frog (12), sole (13), toe (14), how to measure width (15), quarter (16), how to measure length (17)

Nail prick or quicking occurs in a horse if the sensitive hoof structures (usually the sensitive laminae) are penetrated by a horseshoe nail being driven through the hoof wall while shoeing. The nail creates a wound on the inside of the hoof wall.

A close nail or a nail bind is the placement of a horseshoe nail so close to the sensitive structures inside the horse's hoof that it causes discomfort to the horse. The nail is not necessarily placed in the sensitive structures itself, but creates a pressure on the quick of the horse's hoof.

Nail prick is also simply called horse shoe nail misplacement. Horse shoe nail misplacement has several names and the terminology is not always used with exactly the same meaning. It is also called to puncture, to pinch, to prick, or to quick a horse. Quicking or nail-quicked is used both for the actual penetration (pricking) into the area with sensitive tissue of the horse's hoof and about a close nail that exerts pressure on the sensitive tissue. Colloquially it is also called hot nail.

== Cause ==
If the nail takes the wrong direction and penetrates inside the hoofwall it leads to bleeding and pressure inside the sole. This area is rich in blood vessels and nerves and damage here is very painful to the horse. Nail prick can occur due to poorly made horseshoes, misdirected nails, too large nails, poorly placed nail holes, and faulty nails. Horses with poor hoof quality, thin hoof walls, or flaring hoof walls are difficult to nail and there is an increased risk of nail prick. Nail prick is due to a horseshoe nail penetrating the hoof wall and coming too close to or penetrating the sensitive structures inside the horse's hoof. Nail prick can happen to the best of farriers especially if the horse is fractious or young and has not been previously shod.

== Symptoms ==
The symptoms of nail prick are varying degrees of lameness in the horse. Nail pricking leads to the horse going lame at once. A close nail leads to the horse going lame after some days. Placing the thongs on the head of the nail is a way to identify which nail is the cause. If the faulty nail are taken out at once the horse will have few symptoms of pain (whether or not there is blood from the hole). The hoof will turn warm and by feeling the arteries to the hoof an increased pulsation can be felt. When the hoof is inspected the horse can feel pain when pressure is applied to the damaged area.

== Treatment ==
It is primarily the farrier who takes care of nail prick and close nails.

If the nail prick is discovered at once further treatment is usually not necessary. Sometimes the whole shoe is taken off. If there is suspicion of dirt or bacteria having entered the wound together with the nail the nailhole should be enlarged to obtain drainage and the nail hole can be irrigated with dimethyl sulfoxide, povidone-iodine solution, or hydrogen peroxide.

Veterinary treatment includes taking the shoe off, cutting the hoof clean and opening the nail hole to allow drainage. If the horse is in pain anesthesia of the nerve is given. The hole is irrigated and the hole can be packed with iodine-soaked cotton. Superficial infections may only need one treatment. The horse can be given an antiseptic foot bandage for 3–4 days and then be shod if the lameness is gone. The prognosis is usually good provided that minimal damage occurs to vatial structures of the foot. Tetanus prophylaxis is used for unvaccinated horses.

== See also ==
- Horseshoe
- Farrier
- Horse hoof
- Laminitis
