= Equine podiatry =

Equine podiatry is the study and management of the equine foot based on its anatomy and function.

The job title "Equine Podiatrist" is used by people with a wide range of backgrounds. Some are veterinarians who have chosen to specialize in the equine hoof, while some are remedial farriers. There is also a new group of specialists known as an "Applied Equine Podiatrist", this specialist may have neither a veterinary nor a farriery background. This specialist works with horse owners, veterinarians, and farriers to improve the health of the hoof without the use of rigid horseshoes and by taking a more holistic approach. The designation DAEP denotes those that have achieved a diploma from the Institute of Applied Equine Podiatry. The equine podiatrist profession can extend to include other equines, such as donkeys and mules.

A human podiatrist is not a M.D. with an interest in feet, but a separate profession with a unique education and licensing system. The use of this term within the equine community has no distinct mandatory education or certification. This can result in confusion as the horse owner is often unaware that the equine podiatrist is a self-appointed title.

In the UK an Equine Podiatrist is not a protected title but the title is accepted as a person who has fully qualified with the Equine Podiatry association UK set up in 2006 as the professional body for Equine Podiatrists in the UK. In order to qualify a person has to successfully complete a two year course and is subject to the usual professional requirements such as CPD, insurance, disciplinary procedures, further education etc.

== Overview ==
The common adage “no foot, no horse” rings true in that the shape and soundness of a horse’s hoof dictates the tasks it can perform. Equine athletes asked to perform at intense levels of competition experience a great deal of wear on the internal and external structures of the hoof. Additionally, the variation in hoof structure is also dependent upon many other factors, including age, genetics, nutrition, and breed.

Equine podiatry essentially characterizes the factors that contribute to a reduction in hoof health and performance such as poor conformation, improper hoof trimming and/or shoeing, intense exercise, and insufficient hoof tissue maturation. Podiatrists also study the ways in which hoof function can be managed and improved in the equine athlete, and work to prevent the incidence of foot problems through proper hoof maintenance or the use of protective shoeing.

== Shod Versus Shoeless Debate ==
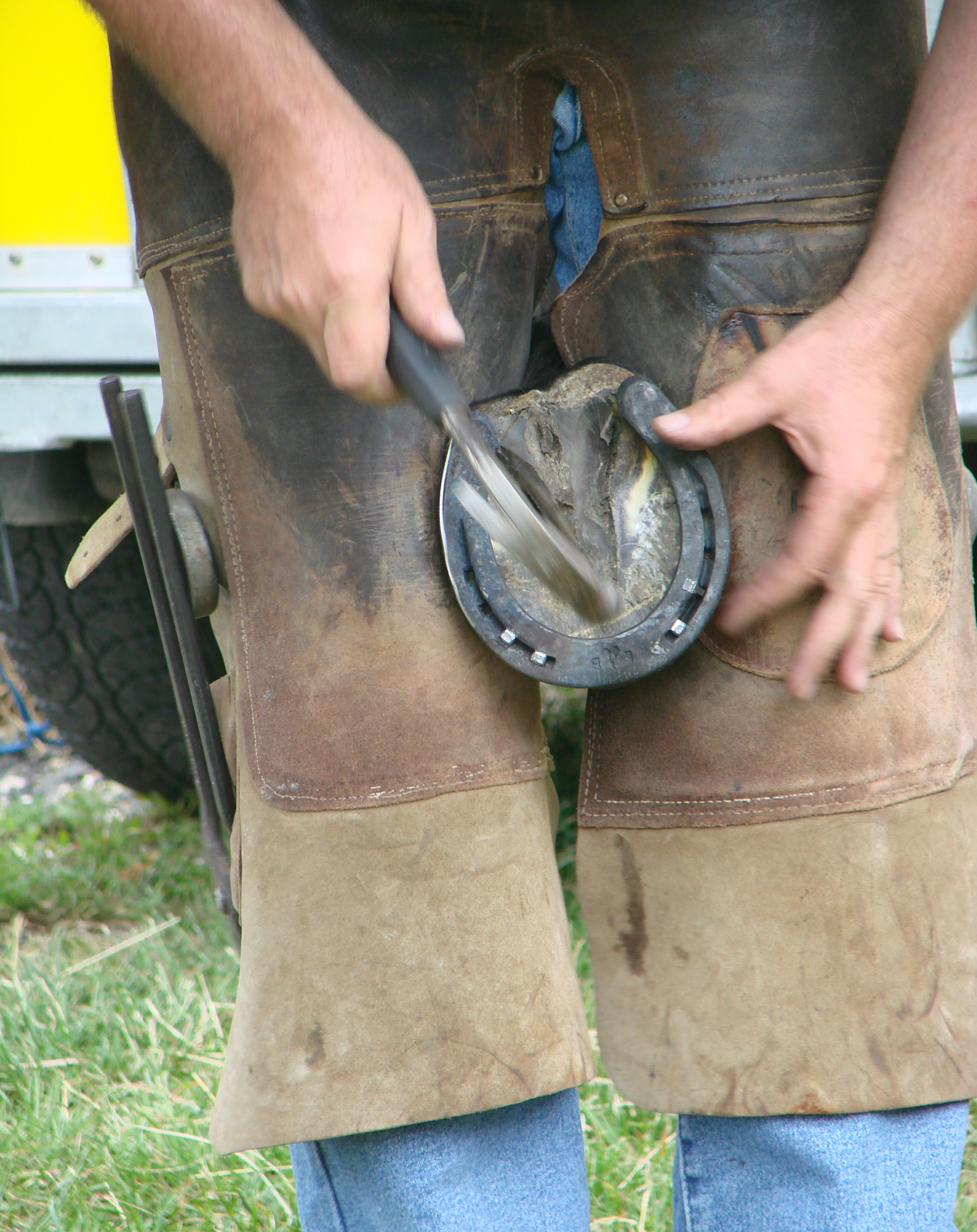
Horse being fitted with a horseshoe.

Minimal connectedness among farriers, scientists and equine veterinarians contributes to ambiguity among practitioners. In addition, many of the current procedures in this area are based on personal opinion and traditional practices rather than factual information based on clinical research.

The controversy currently surrounding equine podiatry is whether or not horses should be shod or left barefoot. Traditionally, the practice of horseshoeing was implemented to prevent wear of the hoof wall; however, the modern argument is that traditional farriery with steel shoes can restrict natural flexion of the hoof wall, cause hoof deformities, induce lameness, and increase the incidence of horse injury. It is stated that these ailments result from the horseshoe’s tendency to distribute concussive forces unevenly across the foot. Proponents of this side are of the belief that horses should be left barefoot and given ample opportunity to develop the internal and external hoof tissues by natural means. For example, regular impact on firm ground stimulates sensory receptors in the hoof that, in turn, induce a physiologic response to promote strengthening of the hoof wall and an increased sole thickness.

On the other hand, some insist that the choice of whether or not to shoe should be considered on a case-by-case basis. They agree that it is favorable to allow horses to be shoeless when possible, for the same reasons as those listed above. They also point out, however, that the use of shoes can be beneficial in many instances. This includes times when wear of the hoof exceeds its growth, or when extra traction is needed for horses in competition. Horseshoes can also be used to correct lameness, stabilize hoof cracks, and realign bone in the case of laminitis. Many proponents of this ideal argue for the natural development of proper hoof structure at a young age, guided only by appropriate trimming and shaping of the hoof as needed. In the first three years in a horse’s life, adequate hoof development stems mainly from stimulation of the horse receptors during normal exercise and turn out; however, the intense training experienced by two-year-old racehorses puts excess stress on the immature bone structure. When the horse is shod to alleviate the resulting discomfort, the hoof receptors lose contact with the ground, which further weakens the foot. Without proper treatment, this will often lead to the development of chronic hoof problems.

While both sides argue valid points, further research is needed to better understand the factors that contribute to improved hoof health and equine performance.
