= White line disease =

Horse disease

White line disease (also known as seedy toe) is an infection of a hoof in horses or cattle. As the name suggests, it attacks the white line, which connects the sole to the hoof wall. It is sometimes mistaken for hoof wall separation disease, but is not to be confused because it is not genetic nor as severe.

== Clinical signs ==
White line disease changes the typical light color of the white line to a black or dark gray color. It may also give off a foul odor. Lameness is often not present unless the disease is advanced. The disease may locate in the toe area of the hoof, giving rise to the name seedy toe. White line disease may not be noticed by the horse owner and is most often diagnosed by a farrier during routine hoof trims or shoeing. It may affect horses of any age, breed or sex, and can affect one foot or all four feet.

== Causes ==
White line disease is most often seen in moist, humid areas with large annual rainfall totals. The exact organism that causes white line disease is not known, but it is known to be caused by bacteria in the soil getting into a weakened spot in the hoof wall, such as a quarter crack, which then sets up a fungal infection that leads to the disease. Hoof infections are often attributed to poor management, but with white line disease this is often not the case, as it is seen even in horses kept in very clean stables and facilities.

== Treatment ==
White line disease is sometimes treated by applying borax or bleach solution to the affected area of the hoof, but this is not often successful. A recommended method of treatment is to cut away the hoof wall over the affected area, known as hoof wall resection or debridement. Sometimes, if the problem is severe enough, the horse may need to be specially shod with a heart-bar shoe.
