= Simon Curtis =

Simon Curtis may refer to:

- Simon Curtis (singer), American singer-songwriter, record producer, and actor
- Simon Curtis (filmmaker), British film director and producer
- Simon John Curtis, British farrier, author and lecturer
