= Quittor =

Lower leg infection of equines

Quittor is an infection of the collateral cartilage within the foot of equines. A condition once common in draft horses, particularly horses working it is characterized by a draining tract. Quittor usually results from an injury in the region of the coronary band above the hoof, leading to an infection. In some cases, removing the infected cartilage requires cutting away parts of the hoof.

Because use of draft horses has declined significantly, it is less commonly encountered today.

Outdated textbooks sometimes refer to subsolar abscessation as "cutaneous quittor" but this is no longer in common usage.
