= Shoeing (painting) =

Painting by Edwin Landseer

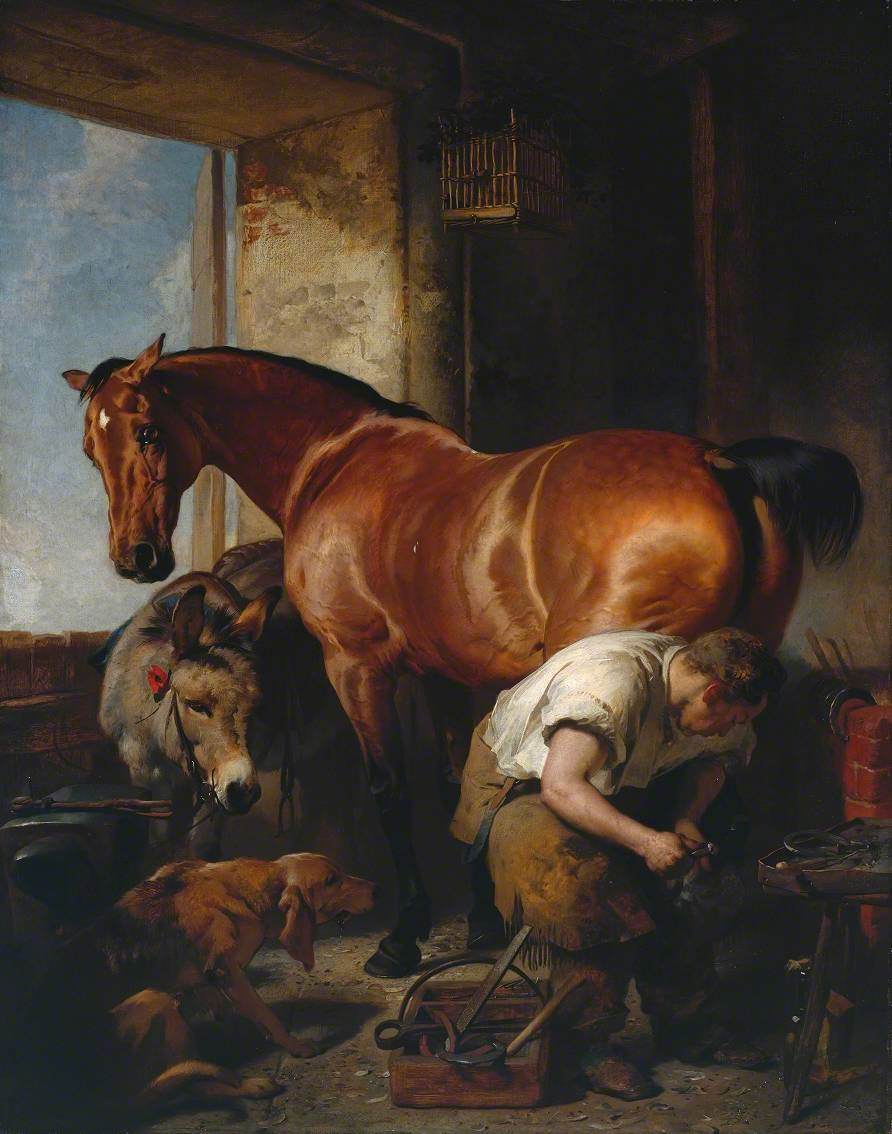
- Artist: Edwin Landseer
- Year: 1844
- Type: Oil on canvas, genre painting
- Dimensions: 142.2 cm × 111.8 cm (56.0 in × 44.0 in)
- Location: Tate Britain, London

Shoeing is an 1844 oil painting by the British artist Edwin Landseer. The work was commissioned by the chemist and art collector Jacob Bell, a regular patron of Landseer. It features the mare Old Betty being shoed by a farrier. She is shown alongside a donkey and a bloodhound named Laura, with a caged blackbird above them.

Rather than conjuring up a Romantic image of shoeing similar to the works of Joseph Wright of Derby and Théodore Géricault it more closely resembles more everyday scene or blacksmiths in the paintings of George Morland.

The painting was displayed at the Royal Academy Exhibition of 1844 at the National Gallery. John Ruskin in his second volume of Modern Painters complains about Landseer "wasting his energies on such innanities as shoeing and sacrificing colour, expression and action to an imitation of a glossy hide". It was later exhibited at the Salon of 1855 in Paris. Bell bequeathed the painting to the nation in 1859. Today it is in the collection of the Tate Britain in Pimlico.

== Bibliography ==
- Donald, Diana. Picturing Animals in Britain, 1750-1850. Yale University Press, 2007.
- Ormond, Richard. Sir Edwin Landseer. Philadelphia Museum of Art, 1981.
