= Simon John Curtis =

English farrier and author

Simon John Curtis (born 15 May 1956) is a farrier, author, lecturer and horse hoof-care expert with a PhD in Equine Physiology and Biomechanics (2017). He is a 4th generation farrier; his family have been farriers and blacksmiths in the Newmarket area for at least 150 years. In over 45 years working as a farrier, he has lectured and demonstrated in more than 30 countries including the USA, Australia, India, Russia, and Brazil.

Curtis is internationally renowned in the hoof-care world for his remedial farriery textbooks and lectures. Among other roles, is a Past Master of the Worshipful Company of Farriers, was made a member of the International Horseshoeing Hall of Fame in 2005, and is the only farrier to have been awarded an Honorary Associateship of the Royal College of Veterinary Surgeons.

== Publications ==
Curtis has authored several text books on farriery and has been published in numerous journals, including the Equine Veterinary Journal, Veterinary Clinics of North America, UK Vet, The Forge, and American Farriers Journal, among others.

=== Books ===
- The Swordsmith, 2022 (ISBN 978-1398437050)
- The Farrier, 2020 (ISBN 978-1999324711)
- The Hoof of the Horse, 2018 (ISBN 978-1999324704)
- Corrective Farriery: A Textbook of Remedial Horseshoeing Vol II, 2006 (ISBN 978-1899772131)
- Corrective Farriery: A Textbook of Remedial Horseshoeing Vol I, 2002 (ISBN 978-1899772100)
- Farriery - Foal to Racehorse, 1999 (ISBN 978-1899772049)

=== Papers ===
- Is there a permanent farriery solution to low heels? (2018)
- The effect of loading upon hoof wall growth and hoof shape in the Thoroughbred foal (2017)
- Farriery of the foal (2017)
- Hoof renewal time from birth of Thoroughbred foals (2014)
- Podiatry for flexural deformity in foals (2014)
- External and Radiographic Hoof Angles Differ in Thoroughbred Foals (2014)
- No foot, no foal (2013)
- The Incidence of Acquired Flexural Deformity & Unilateral Club Foot in Thoroughbred Foals (2012)
- Effective farriery treatment of hypoflexion tendons (severe digital hyperextension) in a foal (2010)
- Farriery in the Treatment of Acquired Flexural Deformities (2008)
- Foot management in the foal and weanling (2003)
- Trimming and Shoeing the Chronically Affected Horse (1999)
- Effective farriery treatment for foals with acquired flexural deformity (1992)

== Podcast ==
Curtis began recording his podcast The Hoof of the Horse in 2018, and since its start has featured farriers and horse hoof-care experts from around the world. As of June 2020, there are 36 episodes released all featuring hoof-care professionals from the UK, New Zealand, South Africa, Singapore, USA, Argentina, Sweden, and more."

== Roles ==
Curtis has numerous roles in the equine world, including but not limited to: examining farriers for new qualifications, contributing expert witness testimony, lecturing at various institutions, and advising on a charity board.

- Senior Examiner for the Worshipful Company of Farriers (present)
- Consulting Farrier for the UK Register of Expert Witnesses (present)
- Advisory Board Member at The Brooke Global Farriery Project (present)
- Chairman of the Farriers Registration Council (2006-2010)
- Member of the International Farriers Hall of Fame (2005–present)
- Honorary Associateship of the Royal College of Veterinary Surgeons (2002)
- Past Master of the Worshipful Company of Farriers (2002–present)
- Consultant Farrier at Rossdale Veterinary Partnership (2002–present)
- Member of the Court at Imperial College London (2001-2017)
- Master of the Worshipful Company of Farriers (2001-2002)
- Chairman of Craft Committee WCF (1998-2001)
- Fellow of the Worshipful Company of Farriers (1990–present)
- Associate of the Worshipful Company of Farriers (1987–present)
- Visiting Lecturer at the University of Cambridge (1995-2019)
- Visiting Lecturer at the British Racing School (1990-2018)
- Visiting Lecturer at the National Stud (1995–present)

== Media ==
Curtis' work has been featured in media for various accolades and work within the farriery industry. Features, articles and interviews include:

- Why no hi-tech horseshoe? They have been almost perfect since the end of the 19th century - The Telegraph
- Newmarket farrier awarded PhD in horseshoe making - ITV News
- Forging ahead on the foot of a horse - The Guardian
- British farrier recognised as “unsung hero” in equestrian world - HorseTalk
- Esteemed farrier brings “simple science” to horse owners - HorseTalk
- Farrier Receives NEF Award From HRH Princess Anne - National Equine Forum
- The development of the hoof: the expert view - Thoroughbred Owner & Breeder
- Hoof Growth and Compression: Shoeing Considerations - The Horse
- New book documents the art of farriery around the world - Farming Life

== Awards ==
Curtis was awarded the Sir Colin Spedding Award in 2018, presented by Princess Anne to an exceptional hero of the equestrian world. Other honours include his entry to the International Horseshoeing Hall of Fame at the Kentucky Derby Museum (2005) and an Honorary Associateship of the Royal College of Veterinary Surgeons (2002). In 2017, Curtis was also made a Fellow of Myerscough College, where he completed his degree and PhD studies.
