= Hoof wall separation disease =

Horse disease

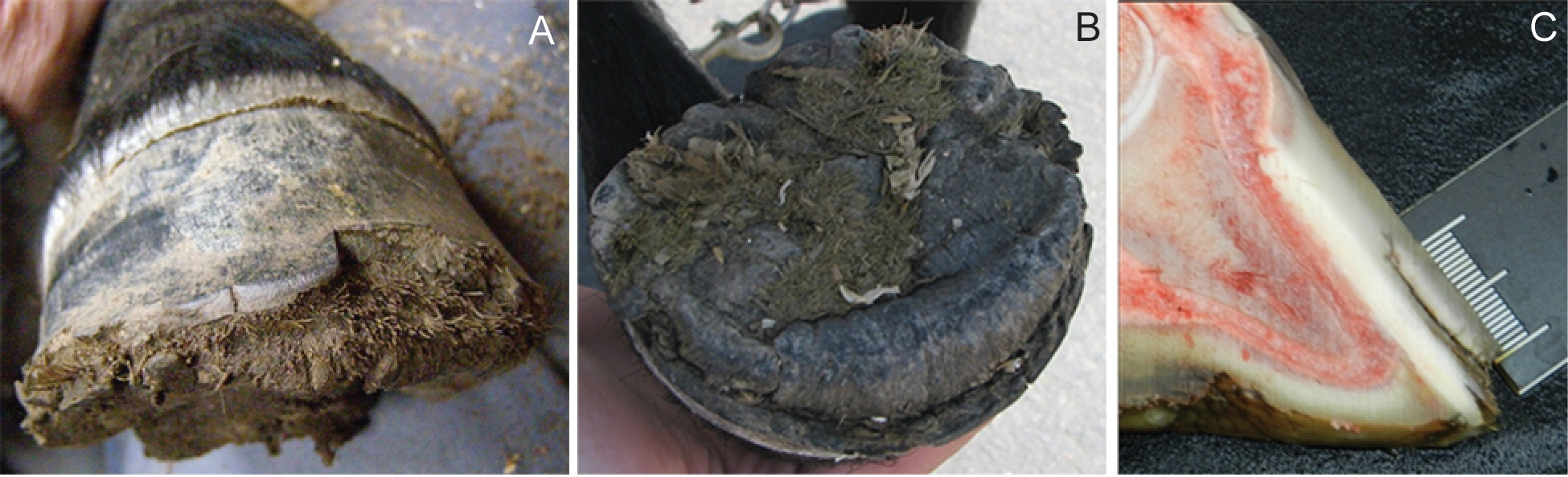
The hoof of a foal with HWSD

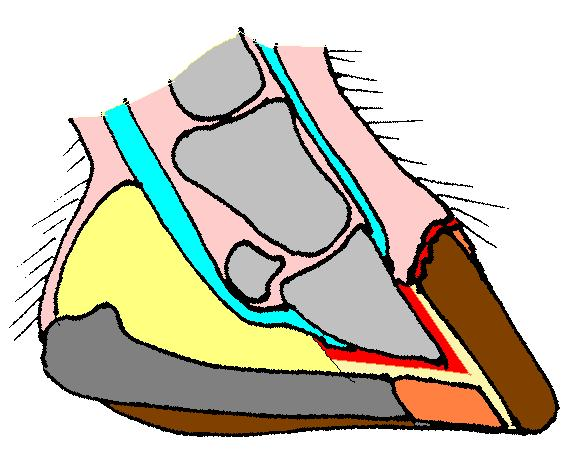
HWSD causes the layers within the dorsal hoof wall (brown, far right) to separate from each other

Hoof wall separation disease (HWSD) is an autosomal recessive genetic hoof disease in horses. Research is being carried out at, among others, UC Davis School of Veterinary Medicine in Davis, California. The disease has been found in Connemara ponies and was earlier referred to as hoof wall separation syndrome, HWSS.

== Symptoms ==
The disease develops among foals from the age of one to six months and typically occurs during their first year of life. The frontal edge of the hoof cracks and splits. Pieces of hoof wall chip off in bits. This cracking, chipping and peeling may involve the whole of the dorsal hoof wall. The deficit means that when the hoof wall reaches the ground (and weightbearing load) the wall breaks away from above the level of the sole. Thus the affected pony has to walk on the sole of the hoof with no support provided by the dorsal hoof wall. All four feet are similarly affected. This can be very painful for the animal, which may lead to the necessity of having the horse put down. HWSD may be confused with white line disease (onychomycosis)

== Origin and cause ==
The disease is an autosomal recessive condition, which means that both parents of the foal must carry the gene in order for the disease to hit their offspring. The disease is associated with a frameshift mutation in the gene coding for the protein serpin B11.

Distribution
	Normal stallion	Stallion with HWSD genes	Stallion with fully developed HWSD
Normal mare	Normal foals	50% normal foals, 50% carriers	100% carriers
Mare with HWSD genes	50% normal foals, 50% carriers	25% normal foals, 50% carriers, 25% with fully developed HWSD	50% carriers, 50% with fully developed HWSD
Mare with fully developed HWSD	100% carriers	50% carriers, 50% with fully developed HWSD	100% with fully developed HWSD

== Tests and treatment ==
Genetic predisposition may be confirmed through a DNA test. There is no treatment as such, owners can attempt to manage the condition though various types of hoof care, and/or the use of special shoes. Such treatment is expensive and labour-intensive. Environmental conditions can make the condition worse (alternating wet/dry hooves). Protecting the hooves from such variations may reduce the effect of the disease.
