= Worshipful Company of Farriers =

Livery company of the City of London

- Arms of the Worshipful Company of Farriers
- Motto: Vi et virtute
- Location: No hall
- Date of formation: 1356
- Order of precedence: 55th
- Master of company: John Cowper-Coles
- Website: www.wcf.org.uk

The Worshipful Company of Farriers is one of the Livery Companies of the City of London. The Farriers, or horseshoe makers, organised in 1356. It received a Royal Charter of incorporation in 1674. Over the years, the Company has evolved from a trade association for horseshoe makers into an organisation for those devoted to equine welfare, including veterinary surgeons. It also supports general charities, as do other Livery Companies.

The Farriers' Company ranks fifty-fifth in the order of precedence for Livery Companies. Its motto is Vi et Virtute, Latin for By Strength and by Virtue.

Today, the Company is one of the few Livery Companies still to play a formal role in its ancient trade. Section 1 of the Farriers (Registration) Act 1975 enshrined the Farriers' Company with continuing duties outside the traditional City of London jurisdiction that normally applies to livery companies. It provided,

"The Worshipful Company of Farriers (hereinafter referred to as “the Company”) shall have the general function of securing adequate standards of competence and conduct among persons engaged in the shoeing of horses (hereinafter referred to as “farriers”) and shall promote, encourage and advance the art and science of farriery and education in connection with the said art and science".

== Past Masters ==
The Master of the Company serves for one year. The annual installation of a new Master for the Worshipful Company of Farriers takes place in September.

Year	Master
2000–01	Lady Graham
2001–02	Simon John Curtis, FWCF, HonAssocRCVS
2002–03	Raymond Edward Greatorex, FCA
2003–04	Richard Frank Wallis, FCA
2004–05	Brigadier Paul George Henry Jepson, BVSc, MSc, MRCVS
2005–06	David Martin Valentine Short
2006–07	Pauline Ann Halliday, OBE
2007–08	Colonel Richard Dennis Kinsella-Bevan, MA, FRGS
2008–09	Carl Bettison, AWCF
2009–10	Reginald George Howe
2010–11	Jeremy Fern, TD DL
2011–12	Stephen John Warham Scott
2012–13	Major General Sir Evelyn Webb-Carter, KCVO OBE DL
2013–14	Simon John Fleet
2014–15	Wayne Edwin Upton, AFCL
2015–16	Guy Nicholas Hurst
2016–17	Selwyn John Peacock
2017–18	Brigadier Neill Patrick Scott O'Connor
2018–19	David John Buckton
2019-20	Steven Wilson FRSA FIoD FIED
2020-21	John Hamilton Wilsher MIMI
2021-22	Lt Col Mark Houghton
2022-23	Martin Russell MBE MStJ DL FCT
2023-24	Mrs Heather Clabon
2024-25	John Chilman AFCL
2024-25	John Cowper-Coles BA FCSI
