= Horse hoof =

Hardened, weight-bearing structure of a horse's limbs

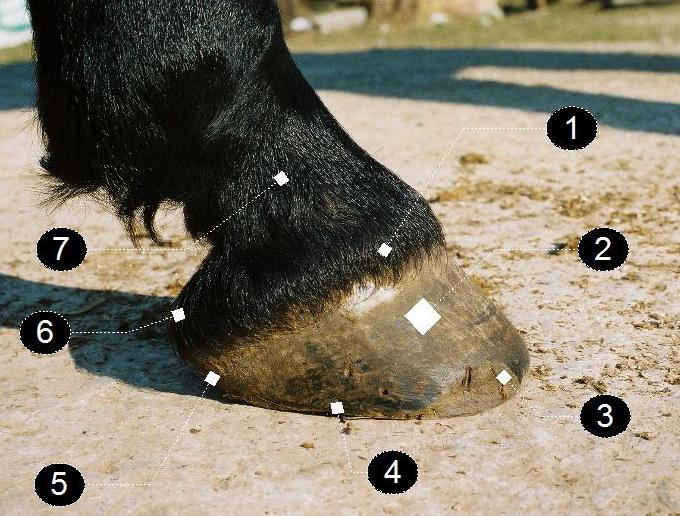
Barefoot hoof, lateral view. (1) Coronet band, (2) walls, (3) toe, (4) quarter, (5) heel, (6) bulb, (7) P2 (small pastern)

A horse hoof is the lower extremity of each leg of a horse, the part that makes contact with the ground and carries the weight of the animal. It is both hard and flexible. It is a complex structure surrounding the distal phalanx of the 3rd digit (digit III of the basic pentadactyl limb of vertebrates, evolved into a single weight-bearing digit in horses) of each of the four limbs, which is covered by soft tissue and keratinised (cornified) matter.

== Anatomy ==
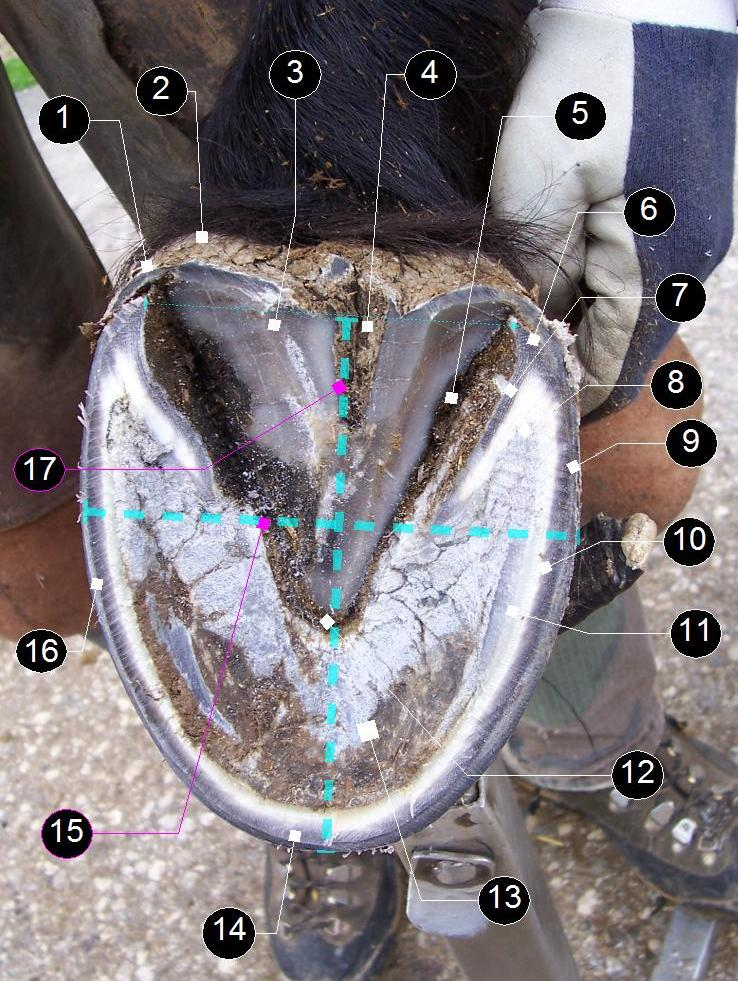
Transitioning barefoot hoof, from below. Details: (1) periople, (2) bulb, (3) frog, (4) central sulcus, (5) collateral groove, (6) heel, (7) bar, (8) seat of corn, (9) pigmented wall (external layer), (10) water line (inner unpigmented layer), (11) white line, (12) apex of frog, (13) sole, (14) toe, (15) how to measure width (fulcrum), (16) quarter, (17) how to measure length

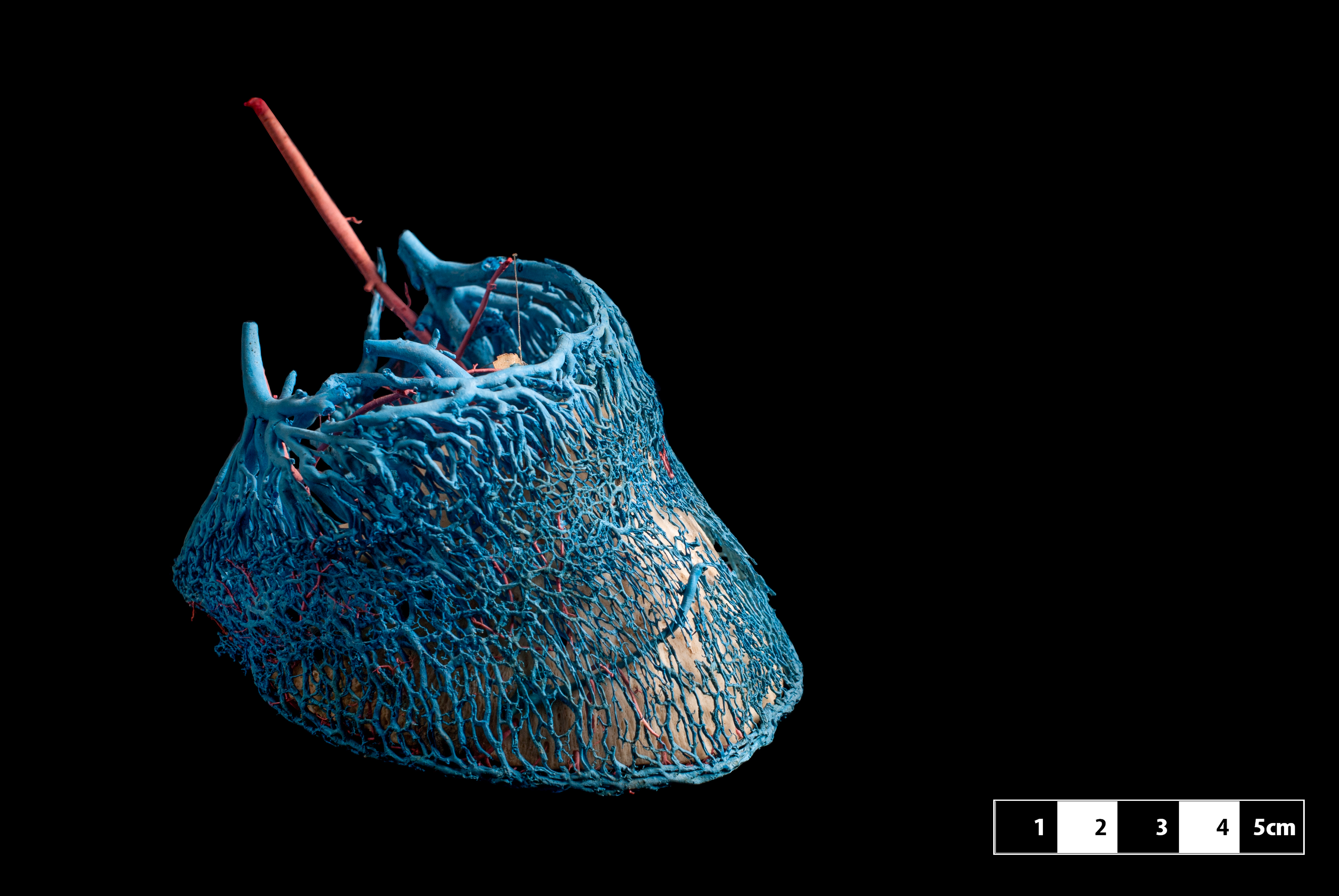
Vascular architecture of a horse hoof

The hoof is made up of two parts. The outer part, called the hoof capsule, is composed of various cornified specialized structures. The inner, living part of the hoof is made up of soft tissues and bone. The cornified materials of the hoof capsule differ in structure and properties. Dorsally, it covers, protects, and supports P3 (also known as the coffin bone, pedal bone, or PIII). Palmarly/plantarly, it covers and protects specialised soft tissues, such as tendons, ligaments, fibro-fatty and/or fibrocartilaginous tissues, and cartilage. The upper, almost circular limit of the hoof capsule is the coronet (also called the coronary band), which is at an angle to the ground of roughly similar magnitude in each pair of feet (i.e., fronts and backs). These angles may differ slightly from one horse to another, but not markedly. The walls of the hoof originate from the coronary band. Walls are longer in the dorsal portion of the hoof (toe), intermediate in length in the lateral portion (quarter), and short in the palmar/plantar portion (heel). Heels are separated by an elastic, resilient structure named the 'frog'. In the palmar/plantar part of the foot, above the heels and the frog, there are two oval bulges named the 'bulbs'.

When viewed from the lower surface, the hoof wall's free margin encircles most of the hoof. The triangular frog occupies the center area. Lateral to the frog are two grooves, deeper in their palmar portion, named 'collateral grooves' or sulci. At the heels, the palmar/plantar portions of the walls bend inward sharply, following the external surface of the collateral grooves to form the bars. The lower surface of the hoof, from the outer walls and the inner frog and bars, is covered by an exfoliating keratinised material, called the 'sole'.

Just below the coronet, the walls are covered for about an inch by a cornified, opaque 'periople' material. In the palmar/plantar part of the hoof, the periople is thicker and more rubbery over the heels, and it merges with frog material. Not all horses have the same amount of periople. Dry feet tend to lack this substance, which is sometimes substituted with a hoof dressing.

== Characters and functions of the external hoof structures ==
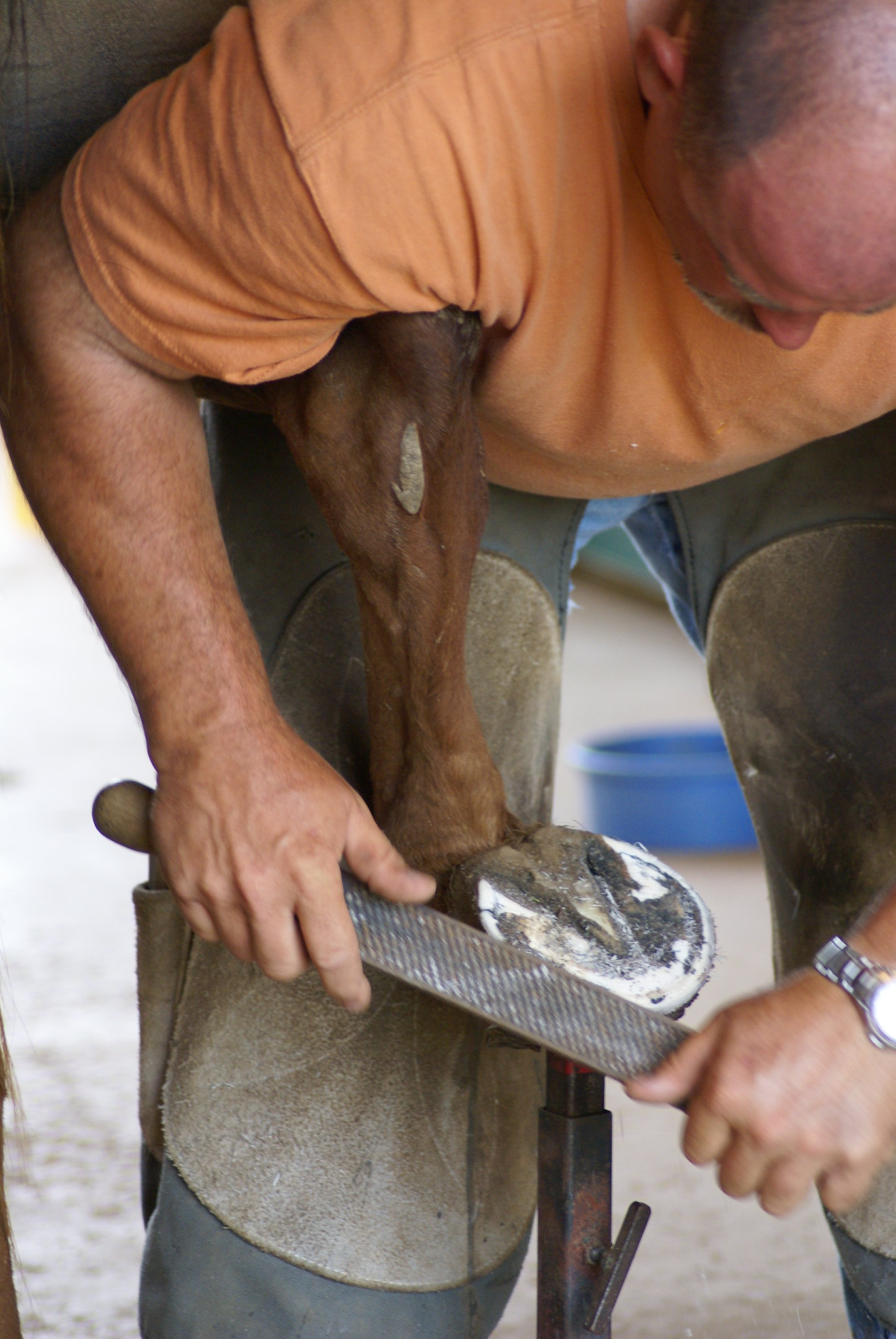
A horse's hoof being leveled by a farrier who is using a rasp.

=== The walls ===
The walls are considered as a protective shield covering the sensitive internal hoof tissues (like the exoskeleton of arthropods), as a structure devoted to dissipating the energy of concussion, and as a surface to provide grip on different terrains. They are elastic and very tough, and vary in thickness from 6 to 12 mm or more. The walls are composed of three distinct layers: the pigmented layer, the water line, and the white line, all originating from the coronary papillae.

The pigmented layer's color is just like that of the coronet skin from which it is derived. If the coronet skin has any dark patches, the walls show a corresponding pigmented line, from the coronet to the ground, showing the wall's growth direction. This layer has a predominantly protective role and is not as resistant to ground contact, which can cause it to break and flake away.

The water line's thickness increases proportionally to the distance from the coronet and, in the lower third of the walls, is thicker than the pigmented layer. It is very resistant to contact with the ground, and it serves mainly a support function.

The white line is the inner layer of the wall. It is softer and fibrous in structure and light in color; white in a freshly trimmed hoof, yellowish or gray after exposure to air and dirt. From the underside of the healthy hoof, it is seen as a thin line joining the sole and the walls. The white line grows out from the laminar connections. Any visible derangement of the white line indicates some important derangement of laminar connections that fix the walls to the underlying P3 bone. Since the white line is softer than both the walls and the sole, it wears fast where it appears on the surface; it appears as a subtle groove between the sole and the walls, often with some debris or sand inside.

The three layers of the wall form a single mass, growing downwards together. If the wall does not wear naturally from sufficient movement on abrasive terrain, then it will protrude from the solar surface. It then becomes prone to breakage, and the healthy hoof will self-trim by breaking or chipping off.

When a horseshoe is applied, it is fixed to the wall. Nails are driven in, oblique to the walls. They enter the wall at the outside edge of the white line, and they emerge at the wall's surface, about 15 to 20 mm from the base of the wall.

The wall is anatomically analogous to the human fingernail or toenail.

=== The frog ===
The frog is a V-shaped structure that extends forward across about two-thirds of the sole. Its thickness grows from the front to the back; at the back, it merges with the heel periople. It has a central groove (sulcus) in its midline that extends up between the bulbs.

It is dark gray-blackish in color and of a rubbery consistency, suggesting its role as a shock absorber and grip tool on hard, smooth ground. The frog also acts like a pump to move the blood back to the heart, a great distance from the relatively thin leg to the main organ of the circulatory system.

In the stabled horse, the frog does not wear but degrades, due to bacterial and fungal activity, to an irregular, soft, slashed surface. In the free-roaming horse, it hardens into a callous consistency with a near-smooth surface. For good health, the horse requires dry areas to stand. If exposed to consistently watery environments, the frog can develop a bacterial infection called thrush.

The frog is anatomically analogous to the human fingertip.

=== The sole ===
The sole is whitish-yellowish or sometimes grayish, covering the whole space from the perimeter of the wall to the bars and the frog, on the underside of the hoof. Its deep layer has a compact, waxy character, and it is called 'live sole'. Its surface is variable in character as a result of ground contact. If there is no contact, as in shod hooves or when the walls are too long or the movement is poor, the lower surface of the sole has a crumbly consistency, and it is easily abraded by scratching it with a hoofpick. Conversely, it has a very hard consistency, with a smooth, bright surface, when there is a consistent, active contact with the ground.

A stone bruise affects the sole of the horse's foot. It is often caused by a horse treading on a stone or a sharp object, landings from high jumps, and excessive exposure to snow. These can also occur when horses, particularly baby horses, perform various acrobatic feats (known as horse gymnastics). A major symptom is lameness.

=== The bars ===
Bars are the inward folds of the wall, originating from the heels at an abrupt angle. The strong structure built up by the extremities of the heel and of the bar is called the 'heel buttress'. The sole between the heel walls and the bars is named the 'seat of corn' or 'angle of the bar', and it is a very important landmark used by natural hoof trimmers to evaluate the correct heel height. The bars have a three-layer structure just like the walls (see above). When overgrown, they bend outwards and cover the lower surface of the sole.

=== Internal structures ===
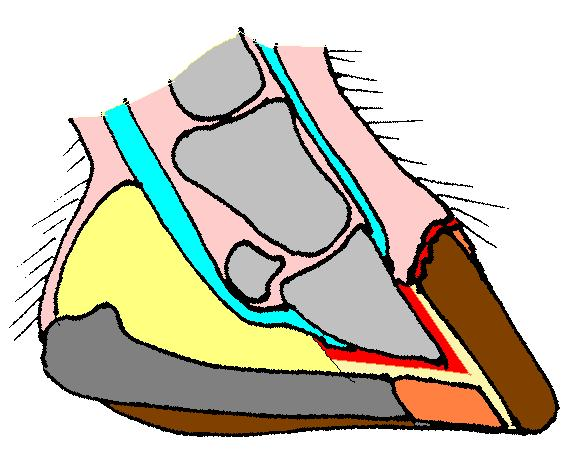
Sagittal section of a wild horse hoof. Pink: soft tissues; light gray: bones (P2, P3 and navicular bone); cyan: tendons; red: corium; yellow: digital cushion; dark gray: frog; orange: sole; brown: walls)

The third phalanx (coffin bone; pedal bone; P3;) is completely (or almost completely) covered by the hoof capsule. It has a crescent shape and a lower cup-like concavity. Its external surface mirrors the wall's shape. The corium, a dermo-epidermal, highly vascularized and innervated layer between the wall and the coffin bone, has a parallel, laminar shape, and is named the laminae. The laminar connection has a key role in the strength and health of the hoof. Beneath the rear part of the sole, there is the digital cushion, which separates the frog and the bulb from underlying tendons, joints, and bones, providing cushioning protection. In foals and yearlings, the digital cushion is composed of fibro-fatty, soft tissue. In the adult horse, it develops a fibrocartilaginous network that helps support the bony column. Normal transformation of the digital cushion into fibrocartilaginous tissue is now considered a key goal, both for prevention of, and for rehabilitation of recovering cases of navicular syndrome. The flexor tendon lies deeper, just along the palmar surface of the small pastern bone (PII) and navicular bone, and it connects with the solar surface of P3; the navicular bone functions as a pulley.

== The hoof mechanism ==
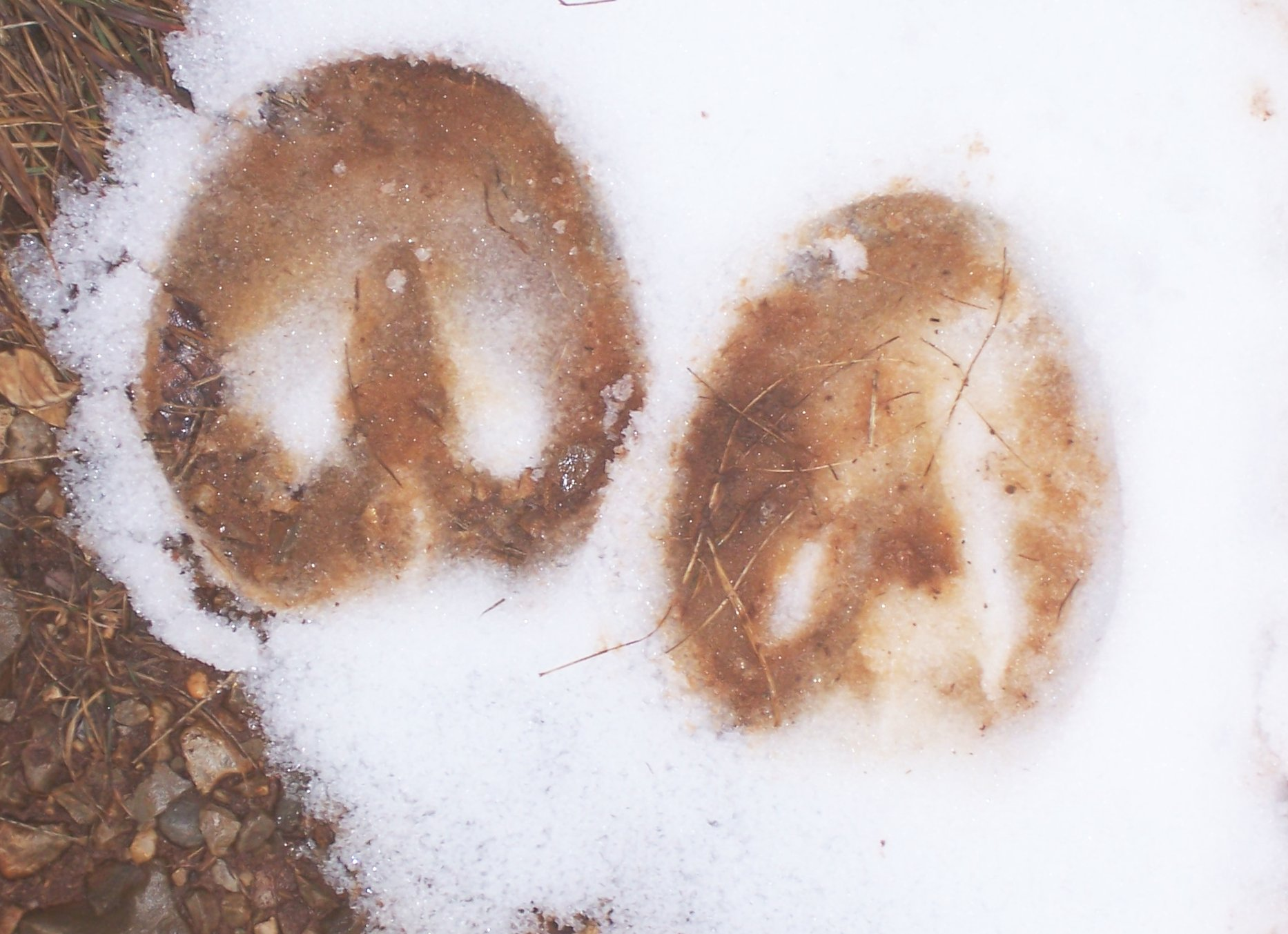
Bare hooves imprints on the snow. Left, a front print, right, a hind print; note the different shape and contact area with the ground.

The horse hoof is not a rigid structure, but fairly elastic and flexible. When loaded, the hoof morphologically changes its shape. In part, this is a result of solar concavity, which has a variable depth in the region of 1–1.5 cm. In part, it is a result of the arched shape of the lateral lower profile of the walls and sole, so that when an unloaded hoof touches a firm ground surface, there is only contact at the toe and heels (active contact). A loaded hoof has a much greater area of ground contact (passive contact), covering the lower wall edge, most of the sole, bars, and frog. Active contact areas can be seen as slightly protruding spots in the walls and in the sole.

The shape changes in a loaded hoof are complex. The palmar/plantar arch flattens, the solar concavity decreases in depth, and the heels spread. The hoof diameter increases to a 'dilated' configuration, and P3 drops marginally into the hoof capsule. There is some recent evidence that a depression takes place in this phase, with blood pooling ('diastolic phase') mainly into the wall corium. When unloaded, the hoof restores its 'contracted' configuration, the pressure rises, and the blood is squeezed out ('systolic phase'). There is a secondary pumping action with the flexion of the foot as it is raised.

The hoof mechanism ensures effective blood circulation into the hoof, and it aids general circulation.

== Time-related changes of the hoof ==
Hooves are a plastic structure, and their time-related, very complex changes can be considered in the short term (days/weeks) and over the horse's lifespan.

=== Hoof changes in the short term ===
Just like the cornified layer of epidermis and of any mammalian nail, the hoof capsule is created only from the epidermis, the outer living layer of the skin. From a microscopic point of view, the epidermis is a multi-layered, specialised cornifying epithelium. It overlays the dermis, and it is separated from it by a basal lamina. It has no blood vessels, and living cells acquire their oxygen and nutrients by fluid exchanges and molecular diffusion from the underlying dermis, flowing into microscopical spaces among individual cells. Products of metabolism are cleared by the reverse of this process. Epidermal growth takes place by mitotic activity in its deepest layer, into the basal layer, with slow outward migration and maturation of cells. As these cells approach the surface, special proteins accumulate into their cytoplasm, then the cells die and 'dry', into microscopic, tightly-connected individual layers, composed mainly of keratin. The resulting 'dead' superficial layer serves a protective function, saving underlying living tissues from injury, dehydration, and fungal and bacterial attack. The constant thickness of the cornified layer results most commonly from regular superficial exfoliation. When a specialised cornified structure has a particular toughness, as in nails and hair, little or no exfoliation occurs, and the cornified structures must slowly migrate away from their original position.

Thus, the specialised cornified structures of the hoof are the wall, the sole, the frog, and the periople. The wall does not exfoliate at all; it is constantly growing downward (about 1 cm per month), and under normal circumstances, self-trims by wearing or chipping by ground contact. In wild and feral horses, solar, frog, and periople materials grow outwards and exfoliate at the surface by ground contact and wear. In the domesticated horse, movement and typical ground hardness are insufficient to allow self-trimming, so humans have to maintain the hoof by trimming the walls and the frog, and scraping off the dead sole.

=== Hoof changes over the horse's lifetime ===
The front and hind hooves are identical in the foal but differ visibly in the adult horse. This is good evidence of the medium-term plasticity of the whole hoof shape, as a result of variation in its use. Slow changes in hoof shape occur under any consistent change in the horse's movement pattern and under a wide variety of pathological conditions. They can be seen now as a clear example of a complex adaptive system, a frequent feature of living beings and structures.

Self-adapting capabilities of the hooves show their maximal effectiveness in wild equids (but domesticated horses show this too, to a lesser extent), as shown by the soundness of feral horses, such as Mustangs, in a wide variety of environments.

== Hoof evolution ==
Equid hooves are the result of the 55-million-year evolution of the horse. The ancestral horse, Eohippus, is characterized by four toes on the hindfeet and three toes on the forefeet. Wild and domesticated Equus species share a very similar hoof shape and function. The present-day conformation of the hoof is a result of a progressive evolutionary loss of digits I, II, IV, and V of the basal pentadactyl limb, with changes in bones, joints, and the hoof capsule. The resulting conformation allows a heavy, strong body to move with high speed on any ground, and most efficiently on open, hard, flat areas like prairies and deserts (an example of cursorial specialisation).

A 2018 study has found that the hoof's skeleton may contain remnants of the horse's other digits.

== Disorders ==
Several disorders and injuries can affect the equine hoof, with laminitis being the most serious. Thrush and white line disease, common infections, can become serious if left untreated. Quittor, an infection of collateral cartilages in the lower leg, is also sometimes seen, although most commonly in draft horses. Hoof wall separation disease is a genetic hoof disease.

Toe and quarter cracks are splits along the line of the tubules in a hoof wall. They can result from poor shoeing and management practices, natural hoof conformation, or injuries to the leg and hoof. Quarter cracks are most commonly seen on the inside of the front hooves or the outside of the hind hooves.

== See also ==
- Deciduous hoof capsule
- Limbs of the horse
