= Farrier =

Specialist in equine hoof care

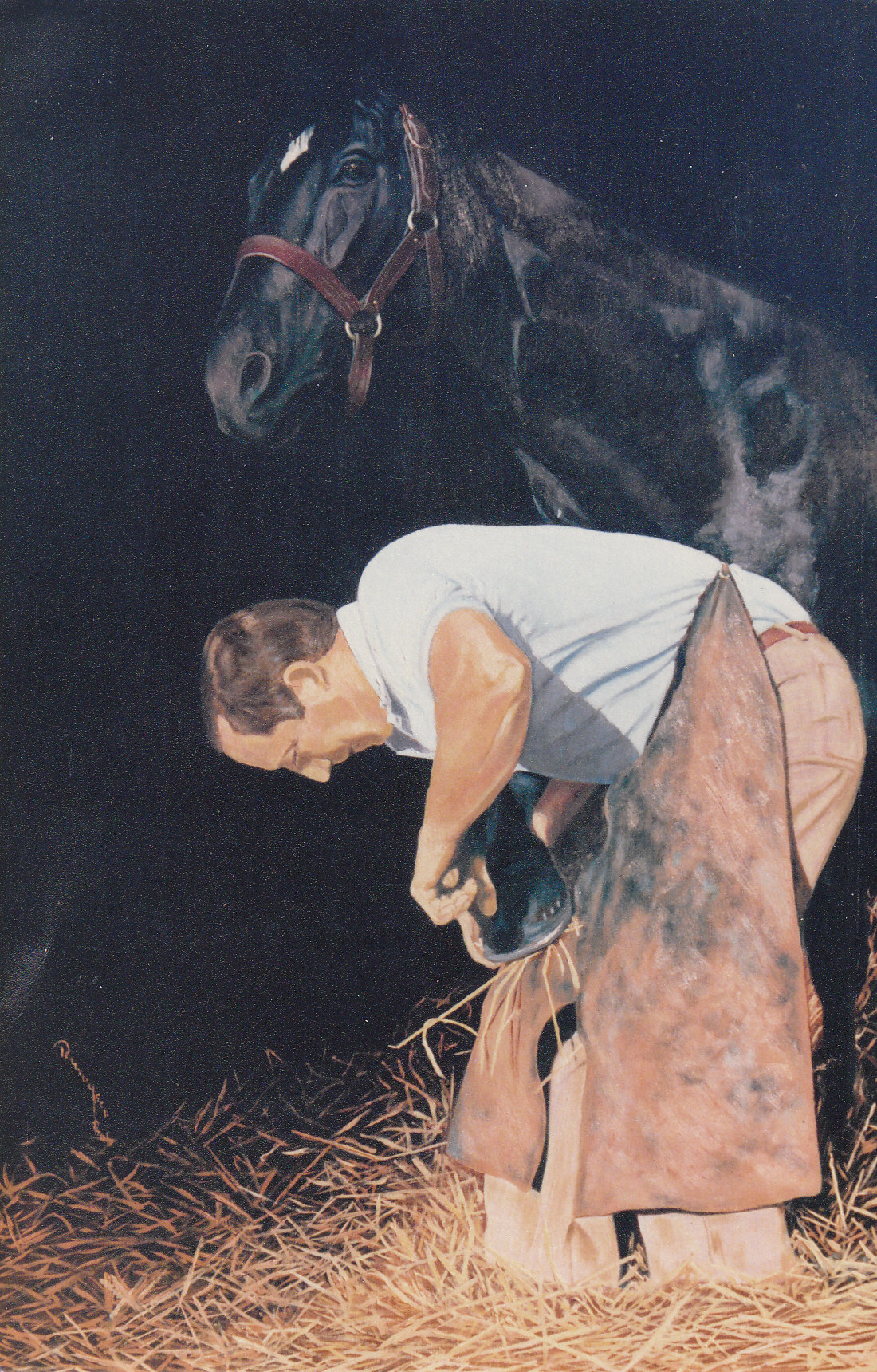
The Farrier, a painting by Bob Demuyser

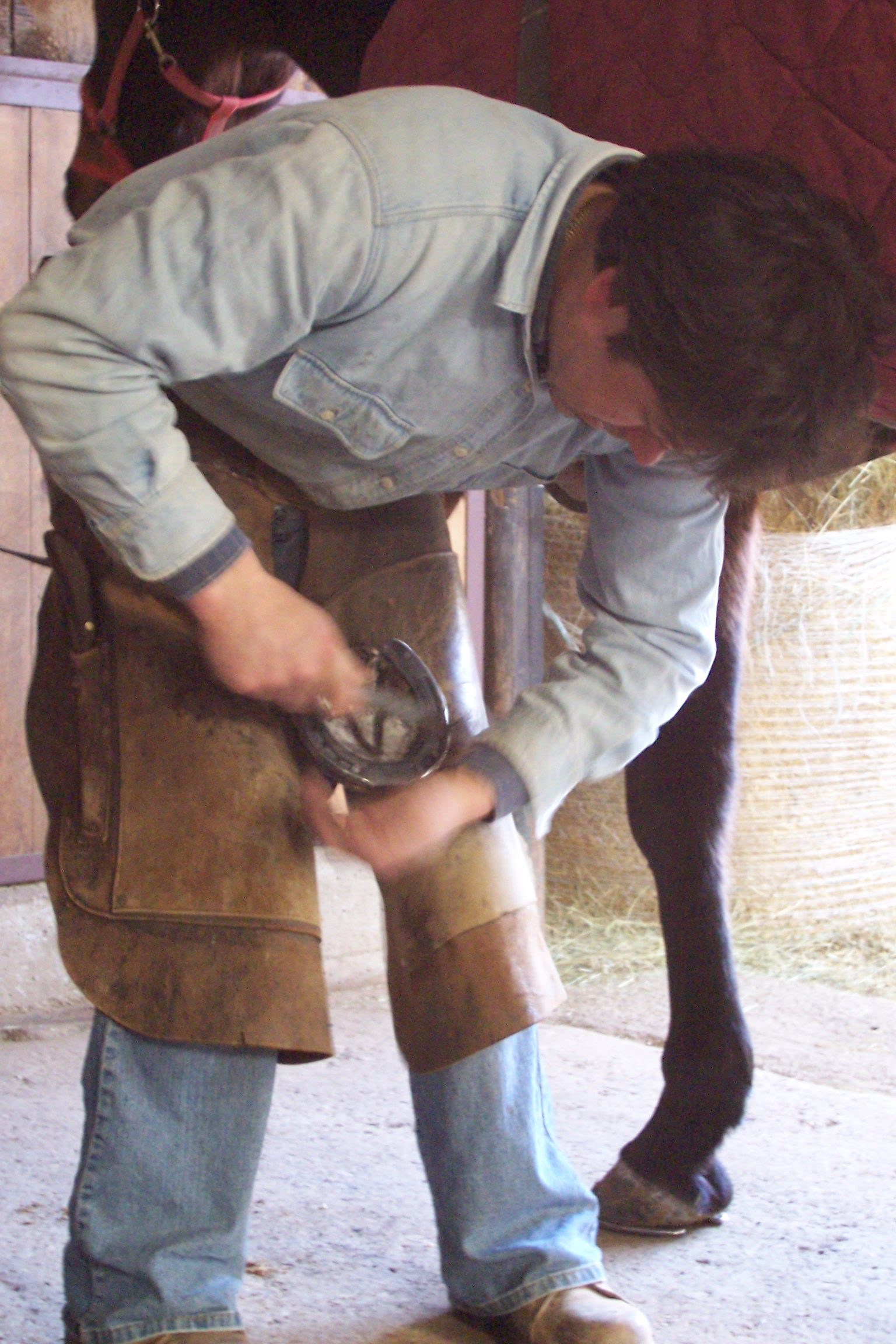
Nailing on shoes

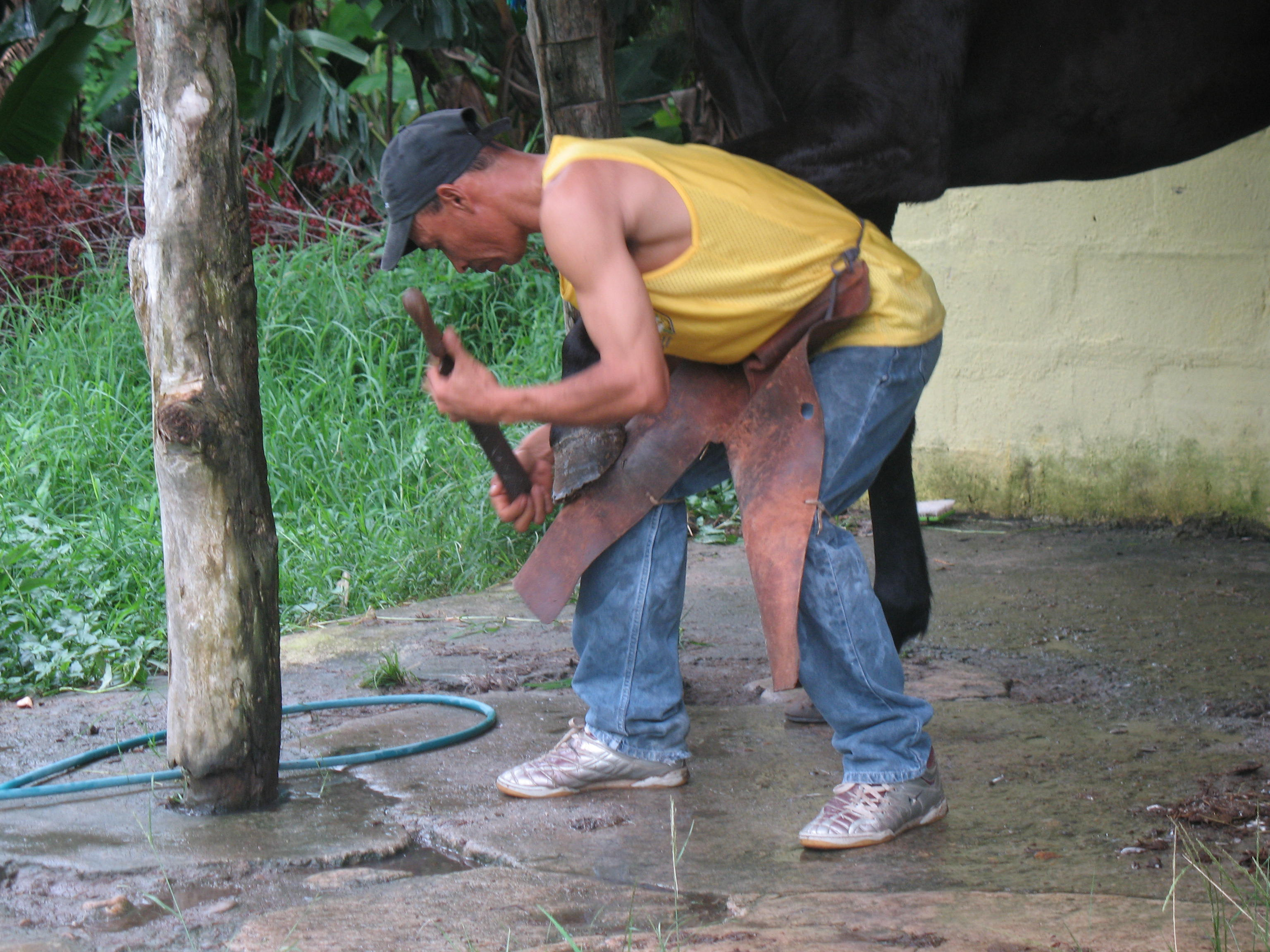
Rasping the hoof

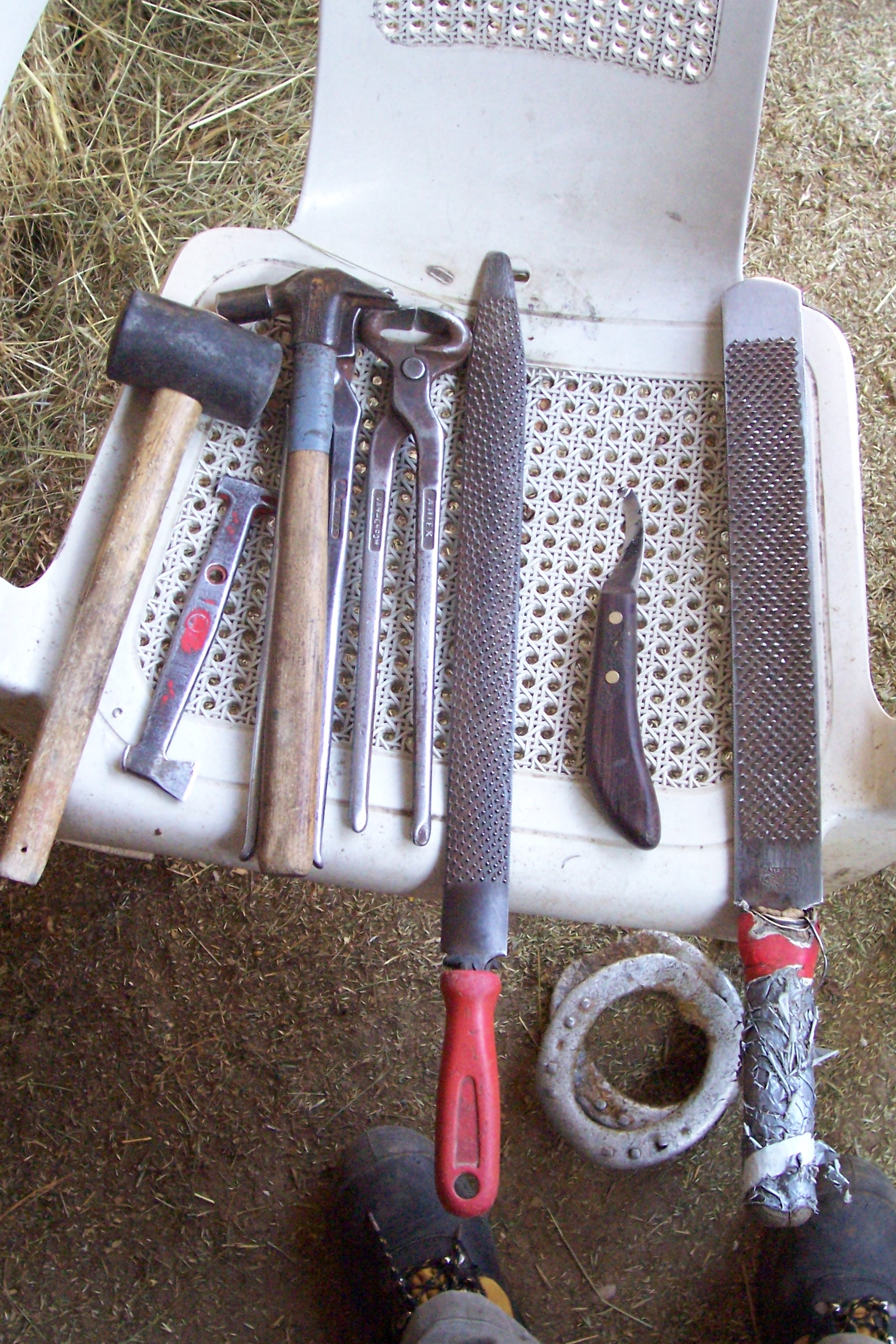
Some farrier tools, including hammers, nippers, rasps, and hoof knife, as well as a set of custom-made corrective shoes on the ground below the toolset

A farrier is a specialist in farriery: equine hoof care, including the trimming and balancing of horses' hooves and the placing of shoes on their hooves when necessary. A farrier combines some blacksmith's skills (fabricating, adapting, and adjusting metal shoes) with some veterinarian's skills (knowledge of the anatomy and physiology of the lower limb) to care for horses' feet. Traditionally an occupation for men, in a number of countries women have now become farriers.

== History ==
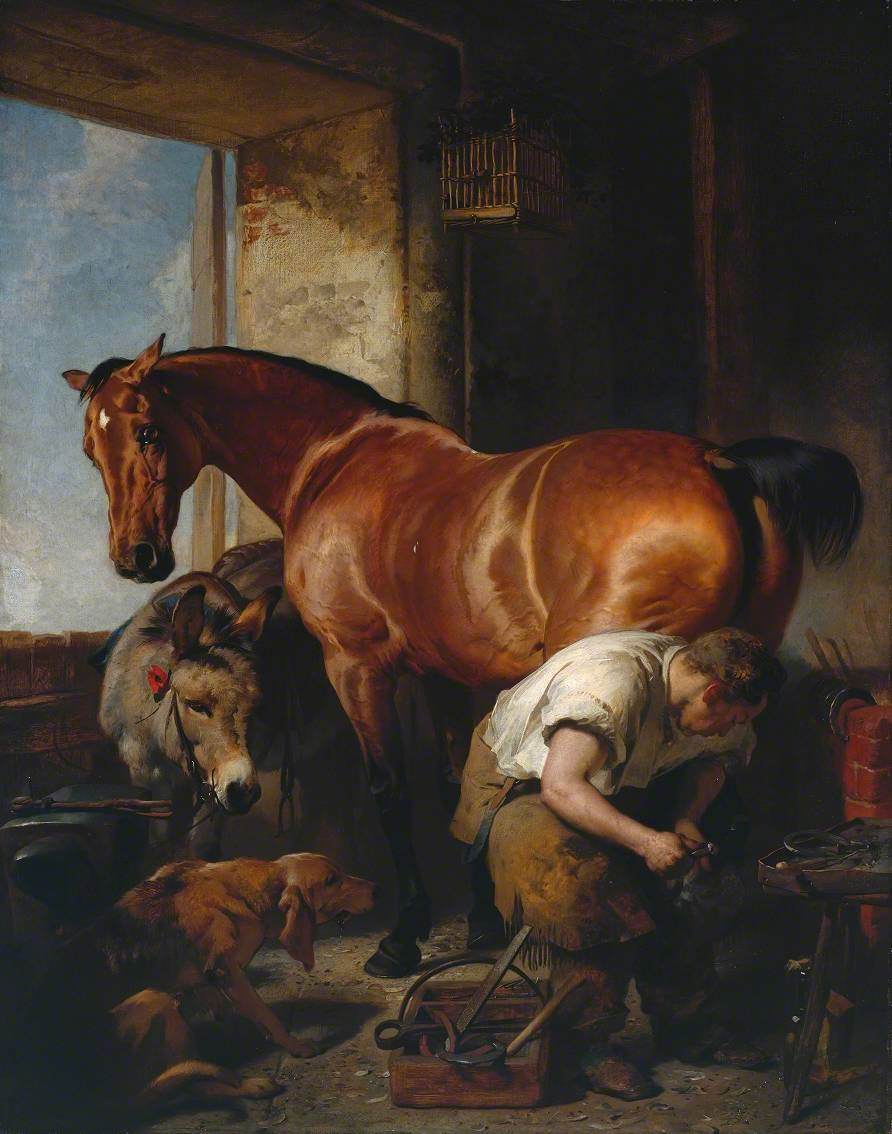
Shoeing by Edwin Landseer, 1844

While the practice of putting protective hoof coverings on horses dates back to the first century, evidence suggests that the practice of nailing iron shoes into a horse's hoof is a much later invention. One of the first archaeological discoveries of an iron horseshoe was found in the tomb of Merovingian king Childeric I, who reigned from 458 to 481 or 482. The discovery was made by Adrien Quinquin in 1653, and the findings were written about by Jean-Jacques Chifflet in 1655. Chifflet wrote that the iron horseshoe was so rusted that it fell apart as he attempted to clean it. He did, however, make an illustration of the shoe and noted that it had four holes on each side for nails. Although this discovery places the existence of iron horseshoes during the later half of the fifth century, their further usage is not recorded until closer to the end of the millennium. Carolingian Capitularies, legal acts composed and published by Frankish kings until the ninth century, display a high degree of attention to detail when it came to military matters, even going as far as to specify which weapons and equipment soldiers were to bring when called upon for war. With each Capitulary that calls for horsemen, no mention of horseshoes can be found. Excavations from Viking-age burials also demonstrate a lack of iron horseshoes, even though many of the stirrups and other horse tack survived. A burial dig in Slovenia discovered iron bits, stirrups, and saddle parts but no horseshoes. The first literary mention of nailed horseshoes is found within Ekkehard's Waltharius, written c. 920 AD. The practice of shoeing horses in Europe likely originated in Western Europe, where they had more need due to the way the climate affected horses' hooves, before spreading eastward and northward by 1000 AD.

The task of shoeing horses was originally performed by blacksmiths, owing to the origin of the word found within the Latin ferrum. However, by the time of Edward III of England (r. 1327–1377) the position, among others, had become much more specialized. This was part of a larger trend in specialization and the division of labour in England at the time. In 1350, Edward released an ordinance concerning pay and wages within the city of London. In the ordinance it mentioned farriers and decreed that they were not to charge more for their services than "they were wont to take before the time of the pestilence." The pestilence mentioned was the Black Death, which places the existence of farriers as a trade independent of blacksmiths at the latest in 1346. In 1350, a statute from Edward designated the shoer of horses at court to be the ferrour des chivaux (literally Shoer of Horses), who would be sworn in before judges. The ferrour des chivaux would swear to do his craft properly and to limit himself solely to it. The increasing division of labour in England, especially in regards to the farriers, proved beneficial for Edward III during the first phase of the Hundred Years' War. The English army traveled into France with an immense baggage train that possessed its own forges in order for the Sergeants-Farrier and his assistants to shoe horses in the field. The increased specialization of the fourteenth century allowed Edward to create a self-sufficient army, thus contributing to his military success in France.

== Etymology ==
The word farrier can be traced back to the Middle English word ferrǒur, which referred to a blacksmith who also shod horses. Ferrǒur can be traced back to the even earlier Old French ferreor, which in itself is based upon the Latin ferrum, meaning 'iron'.

== Work ==
James Blurton, 2005 World Champion Farrier, said, "Farriery is all about technique and getting the horse to do the work for you. It is not a wrestling match."

A farrier's routine work is primarily hoof trimming and shoeing. In ordinary cases, trimming each hoof so it retains proper foot function is important. If the animal has a heavy work load, works on abrasive footing, needs additional traction, or has pathological changes in the hoof or conformational challenges, then shoes may be required. Additional tasks for the farrier include dealing with injured or diseased hooves and application of special shoes for racing, training, or "cosmetic" purposes. Horses with certain diseases or injuries may need remedial procedures for their hooves, or need special shoes.

Traditionally, farriers worked in premises such as forges with yards where they could hot-shoe a number of horses. Changes in the industry including the introduction of electric grinders, gas-powered portable forges, ready-made shoes, and plastic stick-on shoes, have now made travelling to individual clients possible.

=== Tools used ===
Farrier's tools
Tool	Picture	Function
Anvil, hammer		Used to shape horseshoes to fit horse's feet
Forge and tongs		Used to heat horseshoes to allow custom shaping and specialized design, tongs hold a hot shoe in both the furnace and on the anvil
Clinchers		Used to bend over ("clinch") ends of nails to hold the shoe in place
Hammer		Two types, a larger design used on the anvil to shape shoes, a smaller one used to drive nails into hoof wall, through nail holes in shoe
Hoof knife		Used to trim frog and sole of hoof
Hoof nippers		Used to trim hoof wall
Hoof testers		Used to detect cracks, weakness or abscess in the hoof
Rasp		Used to finish trim and smooth out edges of hoof
Stand		Used to rest a horse's hoof off the ground when rasping the toe area.

== Qualifications ==
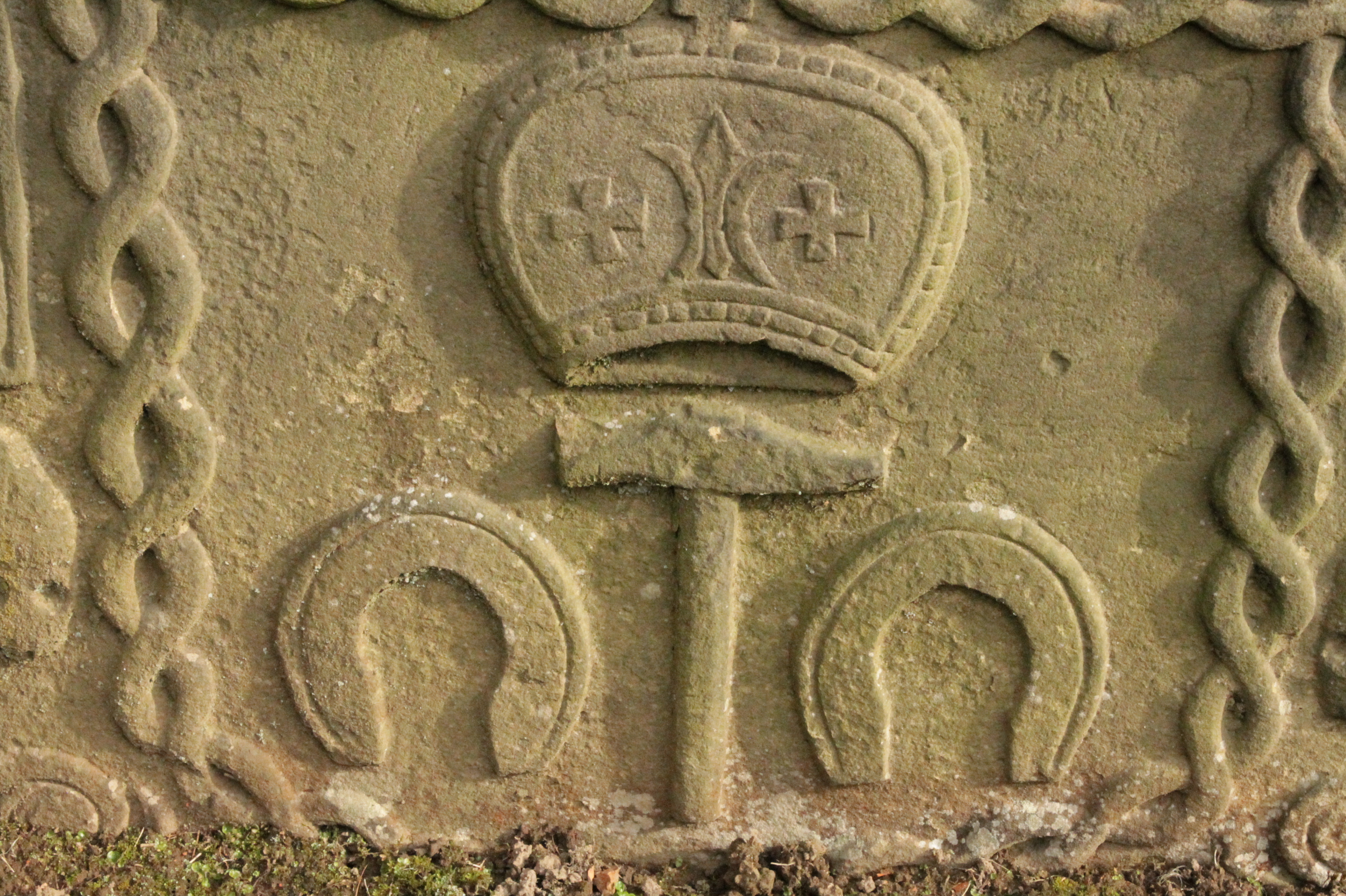
Mid-eighteenth-century gravestone of a Master Farrier, Old Polmont

In countries such as the United Kingdom, people other than registered farriers cannot legally call themselves a farrier or carry out any farriery work (in the UK, this is under the Farriers (Registration) Act 1975). The primary aim of the act is to "prevent and avoid suffering by and cruelty to horses arising from the shoeing of horses by unskilled persons".

However, in other countries, such as the United States, farriery is not regulated, no legal certification exists, and qualifications can vary. In the US, four organizations—the American Farrier's Association (AFA), the Guild of Professional Farriers (GPF), the Brotherhood of Working Farriers, and the Equine Lameness Prevention Organization (ELPO)—maintain voluntary certification programs for farriers. Of these, the AFA's program is the largest, with about 2800 certified farriers. Additionally, the AFA program has a reciprocity agreement with the Farrier Registration Council and the Worshipful Company of Farriers in the UK.

Within the certification programs offered by the AFA, the GPF, and the ELPO, all farrier examinations are conducted by peer panels. The farrier examinations for these organizations are designed so that qualified farriers may obtain a formal credential indicating they meet a meaningful standard of professional competence as determined by technical knowledge and practical skills examinations, length of field experience, and other factors. Farriers who have received a certificate of completion for attending a farrier school or course may represent themselves as having completed a particular course of study. Sometimes, usually for purposes of brevity, they use the term "certified" in advertising.

Where professional registration exists, on either a compulsory or voluntary basis, a requirement for continuing professional development activity often exists to maintain a particular license or certification. For instance, farriers voluntarily registered with the American Association of Professional Farriers require at least 16 hours of continuing education every year to maintain their accreditation.

== Female farriers ==
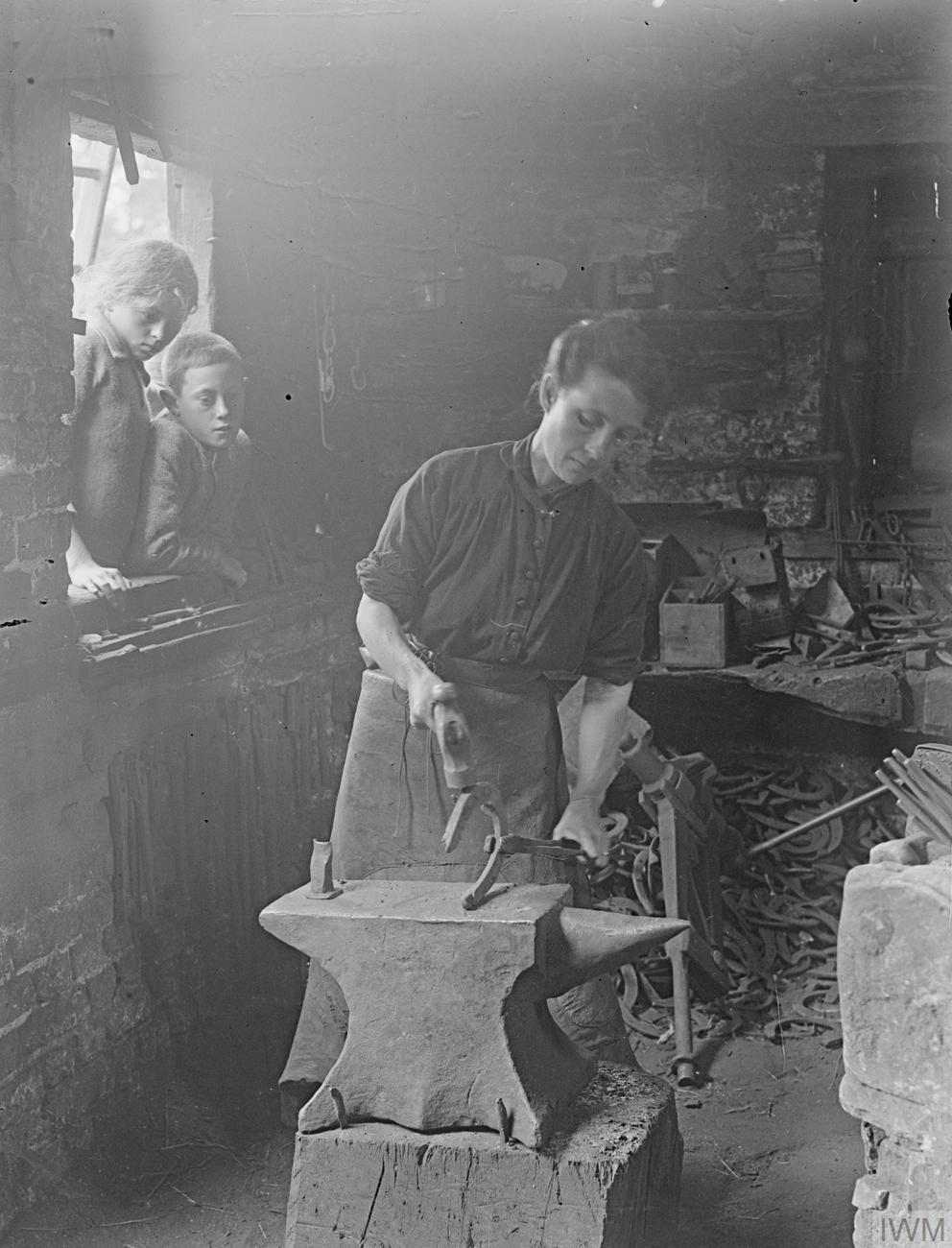
A farrier at work in the United Kingdom during World War I

Traditionally, farriery has been seen as a career for men although images do show women shoeing horses at a horse hospital in the early twentieth century. In the twentieth and twenty-first centuries, however, the number of women entering the profession has risen in, for example, Australia, Canada, Ireland, New Zealand, Senegal, the UK and the USA. Changes in materials and ways of working make it easier for women to combine the career with motherhood. Women in the UK are now becoming 'master' farriers and Fellows of the Worshipful Company of Farriers, training apprentice farriers from around the world.

== See also ==
- Equine anatomy
- Equine forelimb anatomy
- Equine podiatry
- Household Cavalry Army Farriers
- Natural hoof care
