= Latigo =

Latigo may refer to:

- Latigo leather, a heavy, durable, and supple cattle hide leather that is combination tanned
- Latigo, a strap used on a Western saddle to connect the cinches to the rigging
- Látigo (born 1990), Mexican luchador
- Latigo (comic strip), a 1979–1983 Western comic by Stan Lynde
- Fisker Latigo CS, an automobile
