= Western saddle =

Horse riding equipment

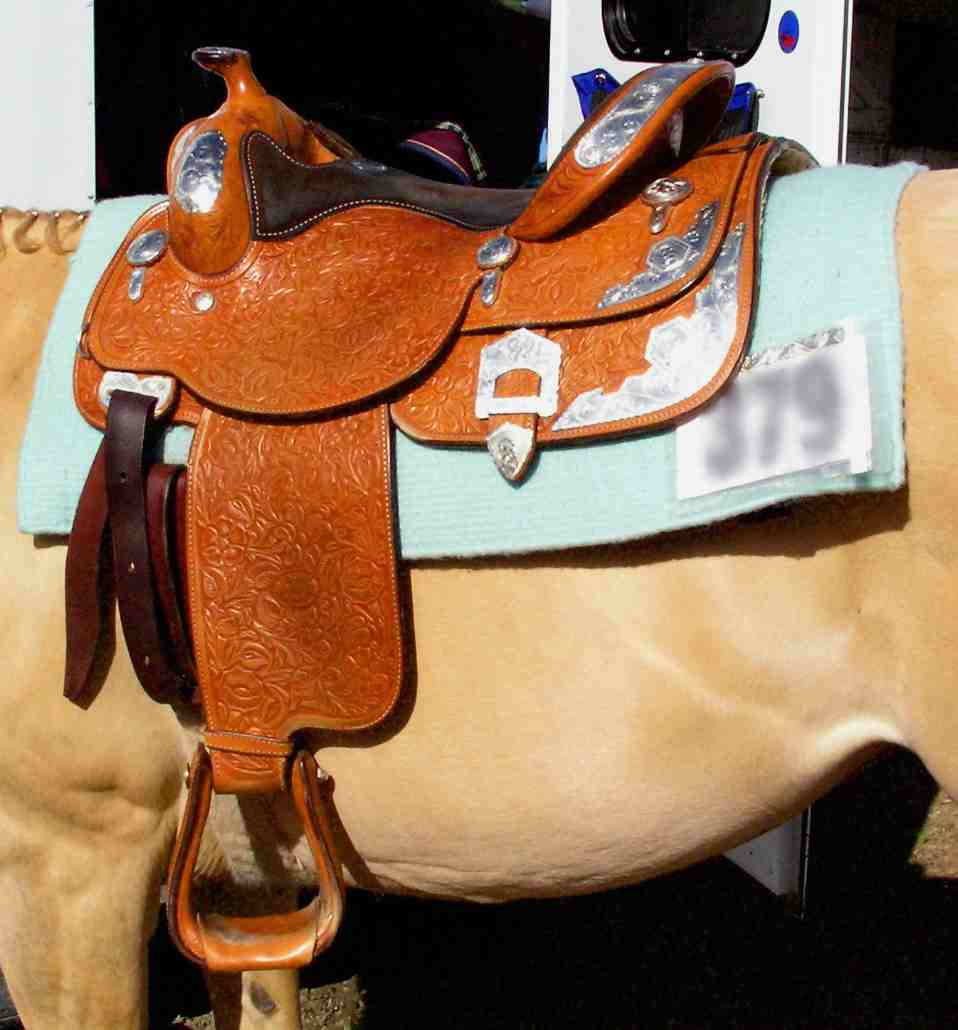
A western-style show saddle with silver decoration

Western saddles are used for Western riding and are the saddles used on working horses on cattle ranches throughout the United States, particularly in the west. They are the "cowboy" saddles familiar to movie viewers, rodeo fans, and those who have gone on trail rides at guest ranches. This saddle was designed to provide security and comfort to the rider when spending long hours on a horse, traveling over rugged terrain.

The design of the Western saddle derives from the saddles of the Mexican vaqueros—the early horse trainers and cattle handlers of Mexico and the American Southwest. It was developed for the purpose of working cattle across vast areas, and came from a combination of the saddles used in the two main styles of horseback riding then practiced in Spain—la jineta, the Moorish style which allowed great freedom of movement to the horse; and la estradiota (later known as la brida), a jousting style, which provided great security to the rider and strong control of the horse. A very functional item was also added: the saddle "horn". This style of saddle allowed vaqueros to control cattle by use of a rope around the neck of the animal, tied or dallied (wrapped without a knot) around the horn.

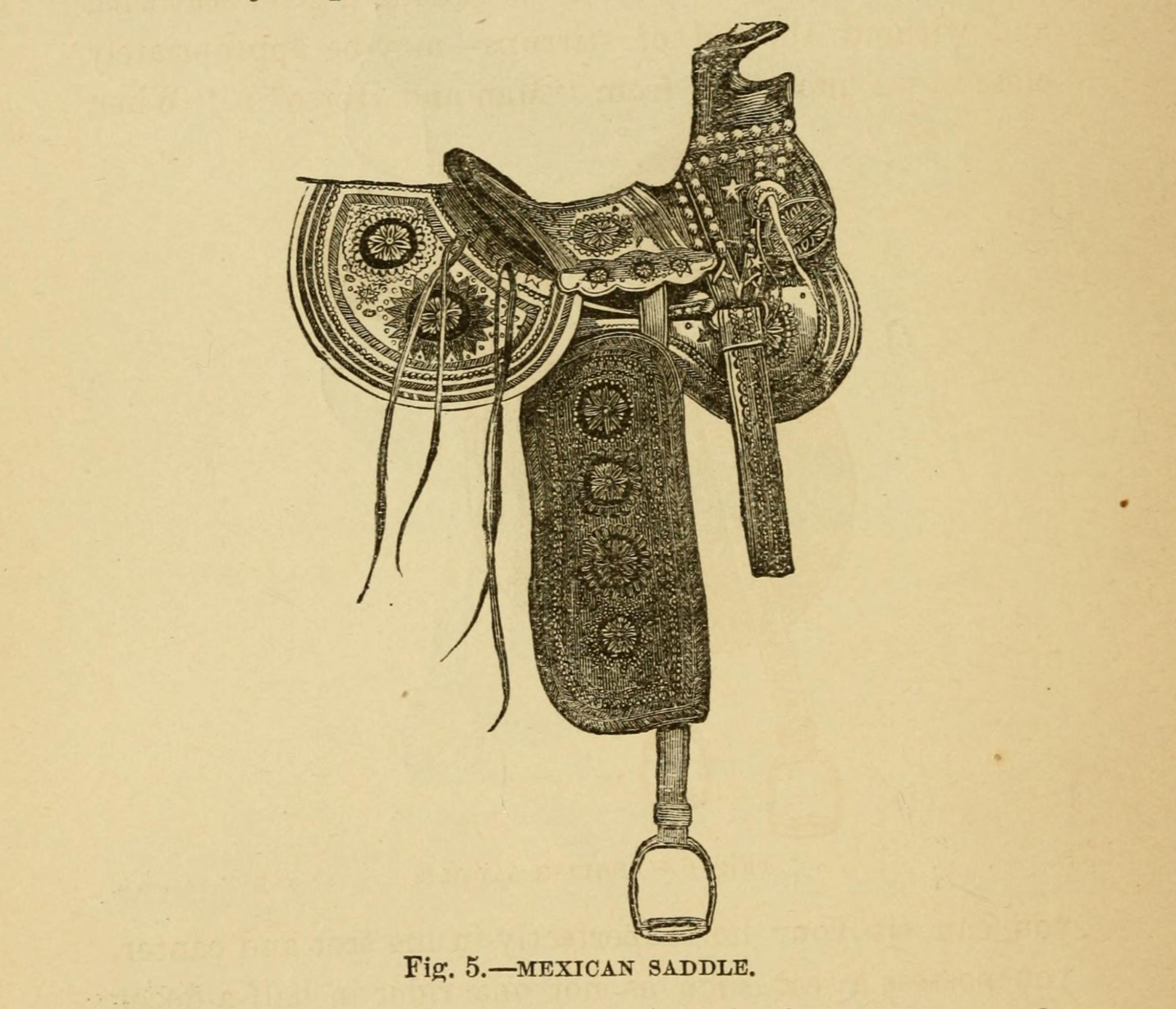
19th century Mexican saddle

Today, although many Western riders have never roped a cow, the western saddle still features this historical element. (Some variations on the Western saddle design, such as those used in bronc riding, endurance riding and those made for the European market, do not have horns.) Another predecessor which may have contributed to the design of the Western saddle was the Spanish tree saddle, which was also influential in the design of the McClellan saddle of the American military, being used by all branches of the U.S. Army, but being particularly associated with the cavalry.

The Western saddle is designed to be comfortable when ridden in for many hours. Its history and purpose is to be a working tool for a cowboy who spends all day, every day, on horseback. For a beginning rider, the western saddle may give the impression of providing a more secure seat. However, this may be misleading; the horn is not meant to be a handle for the rider to hang onto, and the high cantle and heavy stirrups are not for forcing the rider into a rigid position. The development of an independent seat and hands is as critical for western riders as for English riders.

== Construction ==
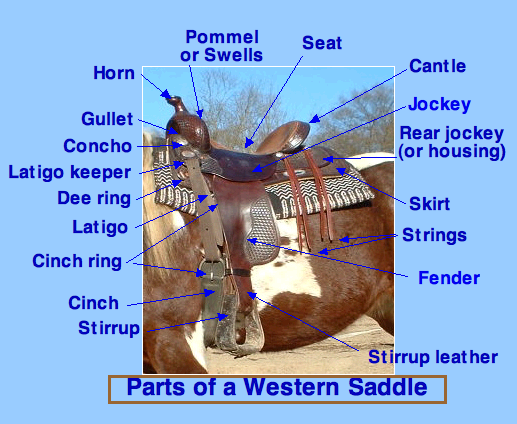
Parts of a Western saddle

The modern western saddle begins with a "tree" that defines the shape of the bars, the seat, the swells, horn, and cantle. Traditional trees are made of wood covered with rawhide, coated with varnish or a similar modern synthetic coating. In some cases, the core of the horn may be of metal. Modern synthetic materials of various types have also been used instead of wood, but while lighter and less expensive, are generally considered weaker than traditional materials, some, such as fiberglass, dangerously so. A high-quality tree is at the heart of a good saddle, particularly those used for sports such as steer roping, where the equipment must withstand considerable force.

The tree is usually covered with leather on all visible parts of the saddle. The seat may have foam rubber or other materials added between the tree and the top layer of leather to provide additional comfort to the rider, and leather or foam padding may be used to slightly alter the contours of the seat. Sheepskin is placed on the underside of the saddle, covering both the tree and the underside of the skirts. The cinch rings, made of metal, are attached to the tree as described under "Rigging," below. For decoration, metal conchos, lacing, and small plates, usually silver or a silver-like substitute, are added.

The leather parts of the saddle are often tooled into designs that range from simple to complex. The finest-quality saddles often have hand-carved tooling that itself is considered a work of art.

== Western saddles compared to English saddles ==
The Western saddle is different from an English saddle in that it has no padding between the tree and the external leather and fleece skirting. The weight bearing area of the saddle is large and usually covered with sheepskin, but it must be padded with a saddle blanket in order to provide a comfortable fit for the horse. Western saddles are extensively decorated and intricately carved silver conchos and other additions are frequently added to the saddle for show purposes.

Other differences between the Western and English saddles include:

An English saddle has no horn, no protective fenders and a different padding system on the horse's back.

- Stirrups: Those of the Western saddle cannot detach from the saddle in an emergency, but instead have a wider tread; combined with the rider's high-heeled cowboy boots, the design minimizes the risk that the rider's feet will slip through the stirrup during a fall and the rider being dragged.
- Cinching (girthing): The method of securing the saddle to the horse. Rather than buckling on as does the English girth, the Western girth, known as a cinch, is anchored with a flat strap of leather or nylon called a latigo that may be secured with a flat knot, or via holes added so that a buckle can be used, either in place of the knot or in addition to one.
- Seat and cantle: These parts of a western saddle are more pronounced than in an English saddle and may provide greater comfort and security to the rider.
- Tree: The tree of a western saddle is larger and covers more surface area than that of an English saddle. There is little padding between the tree bars and the underside of a western saddle, whereas much of the weight bearing area on an English saddle is supported by a large amount of internal flocking inside the panels.

While a western saddle is designed to be ridden for many hours at a stretch; for covering distance where time is a factor, such as with Endurance riding, the lighter English saddle dominates. However, it is not uncommon for Western saddles to be regarded as “easier” to ride, as they don't require the specific technique and style that is imperative to English riding. They are also larger, offering a more supportive and sturdy seat than its smaller counterpart. Lastly, Western saddles have a different general feel to them compared to English saddles, which riders may favor or dislike.

== Types ==
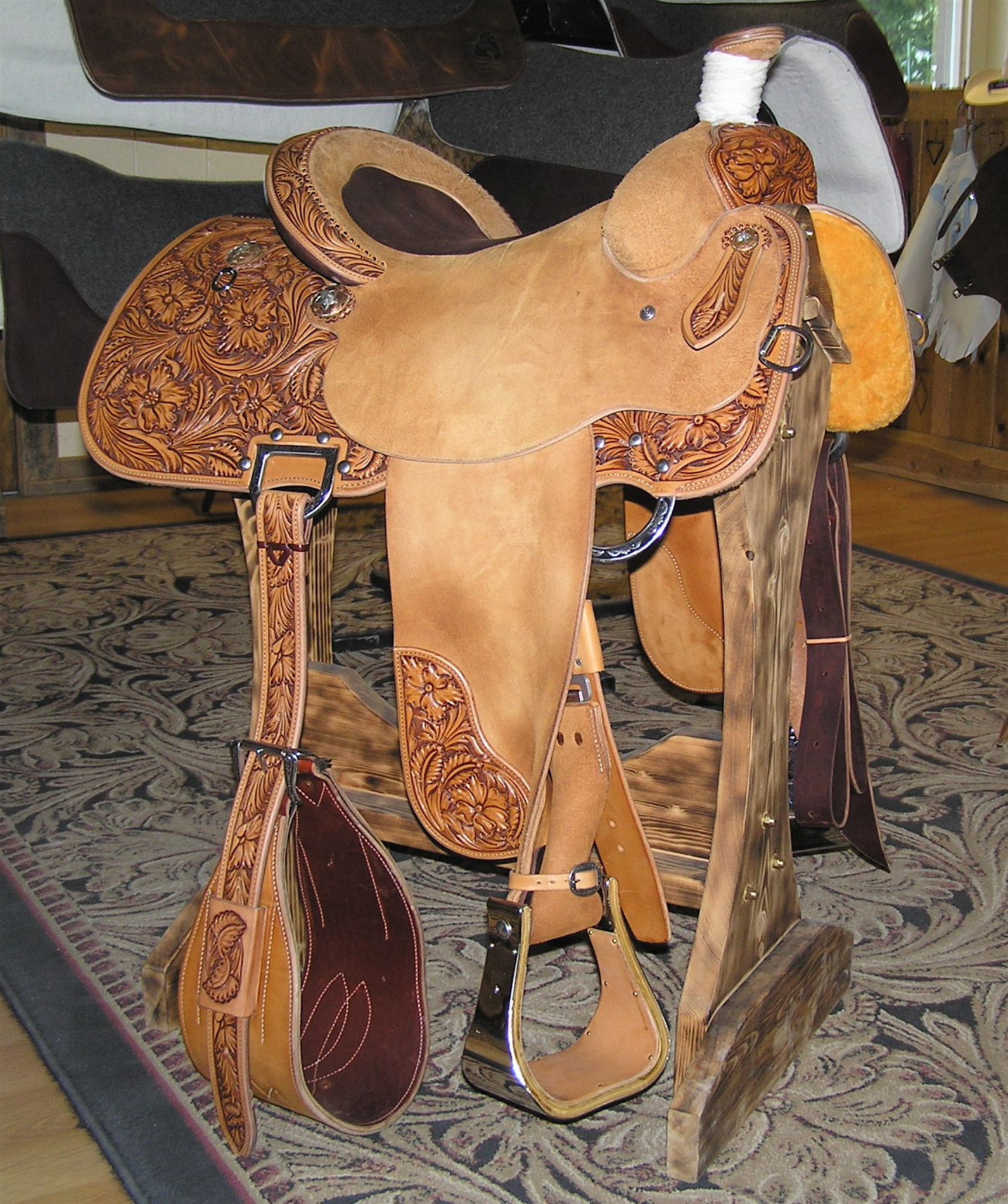
Full double-rigged team roping saddle. Note extra wide back cinch.

There are many types of Western saddle available. Some are general-purpose models while others emphasize either greater freedom for the horse or greater security for the rider, as may be necessary for specialized work in the various Western horse sports such as cutting, reining, barrel racing, team roping, equitation and western pleasure. Factors such as width of the swells, height of the cantle, depth of the seat, placement of the stirrups and type of rigging all influence the uses of a given design. For example, a saddle with wide swells, high cantle and deep seat is suitable for cutting, where a rider must remain in a secure, quiet seat on the horse. At the other end of the spectrum, a saddle with a "slick fork" - virtually no swells - and a low cantle is suited for calf roping, where a rider must dismount quickly, often while the horse is still in motion, and not be caught up on the saddle.

The most common variations include the following:

- Roping saddle: Heavy, sturdy saddle that usually has a thicker horn for securing a rope, low cantle, and slick fork that allows rider to dismount quickly when needed.
- Rodeo bronc riding saddle: Hornless, deep-seated saddle with wide swells, having small fenders with oxbow style stirrups, originally designed and made by rodeo innovator Earl Bascom in 1922.
- Cutting saddle: Has a deep seat and wide swells allows the rider to sit deep and securely through sharp stops and turns.
- Reining saddle: Has a deep seat to allow the rider to sit deeply and more freely swinging fenders for more leg movement on the rider's part.
- Working cowhorse saddle: Highly versatile and designed to work for both reining and cutting for reined cowhorse events.
- Barrel racing saddle: Lightweight saddle with wide swells and high cantle which allows rider to sit securely but also allows the horse to perform fast sprints and sharp turns.
- Endurance saddle: Lighter weight than most western saddles, often without a horn, has a tree that spreads the rider's weight out over a large area of the horse's back, thus reducing pounds per square inch. Often has stirrups hung slightly farther forward, to allow rider to get off the horse's back when traveling at faster speeds. Designed for long rides at faster speeds than a trail saddle.
- Trail saddle: Designed for maximum comfort of rider as well as a good fit for the horse, features deep, padded seat, designed for long rides at slower speeds.
- Show saddle: May be based on roping, cutting, or other trees, but is characterized by additional leather tooling and silver decoration. Usually features a deep, padded seat that allows the rider to sit quietly and give the appearance of a smooth ride.
- "Equitation" saddle: Show saddle with an especially deep seat to help hold a rider in place.

=== Design variations ===
There are many variations of design and optional equipment elements that were influenced by geographic region, history, use and the body types of horses bred in a given area. Certain stylistic elements seen on some, but not all western saddles include:

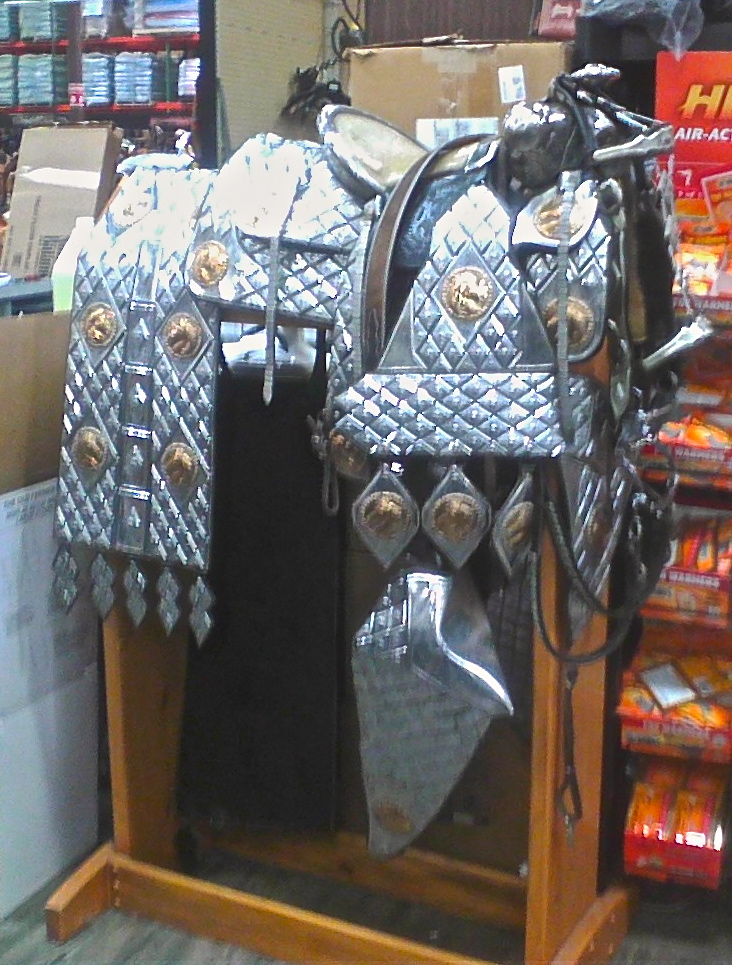
Parade saddle with extensive silver plating, tapaderos, and flank trappings

- Breastcollar, an additional piece of equipment that runs from the saddle around the chest of the horse, lending both lateral stability and preventing the saddle from sliding back. Breastcollars are particularly common on trail horses and roping horses and stylized versions are often seen at horse shows. They are generally made out of leather, but may also be made of mohair or synthetic cord similar to a front cinch, or from synthetic materials that resemble leather.
- Back cinch: A second cinch is often seen on working saddles, particularly full-rigged roping saddles. Made of several thicknesses of leather, it is adjusted just tight enough to touch the underside of the horse, but not tight enough to provoke discomfort or bucking. It prevents the back end of the saddle from rising up in working situations, and when team roping, it also minimizes the saddle fork from digging forward into the horse's withers when a cow is dallied from the saddle horn. The back cinch is generally not required or used on a center-fire or 3/4 rigged saddle.
- Saddle strings, long strips of leather attached to the pommel and back jockey of working saddles, used for tying items to a saddle.
- Horn wrap, primarily seen on roping saddles, extra wraps of leather or other material that thickens the horn and provides support for a dallied lasso.
- Tapaderos, leather covers over the toe that close each stirrup from the front. A tapadero prevents the rider's boot from slipping through and also prevents brush encountered while working cattle on the open range from poking through the stirrup, injuring or impeding the horse or rider. The tapadero was particularly seen on certain saddles of the vaquero tradition where the length was used in herding calves, but today is primarily a decorative element. Tapaderos are not "show legal" for western-style horse show competition in most cases, but are often seen on saddles used by parade horses.

== Trees ==
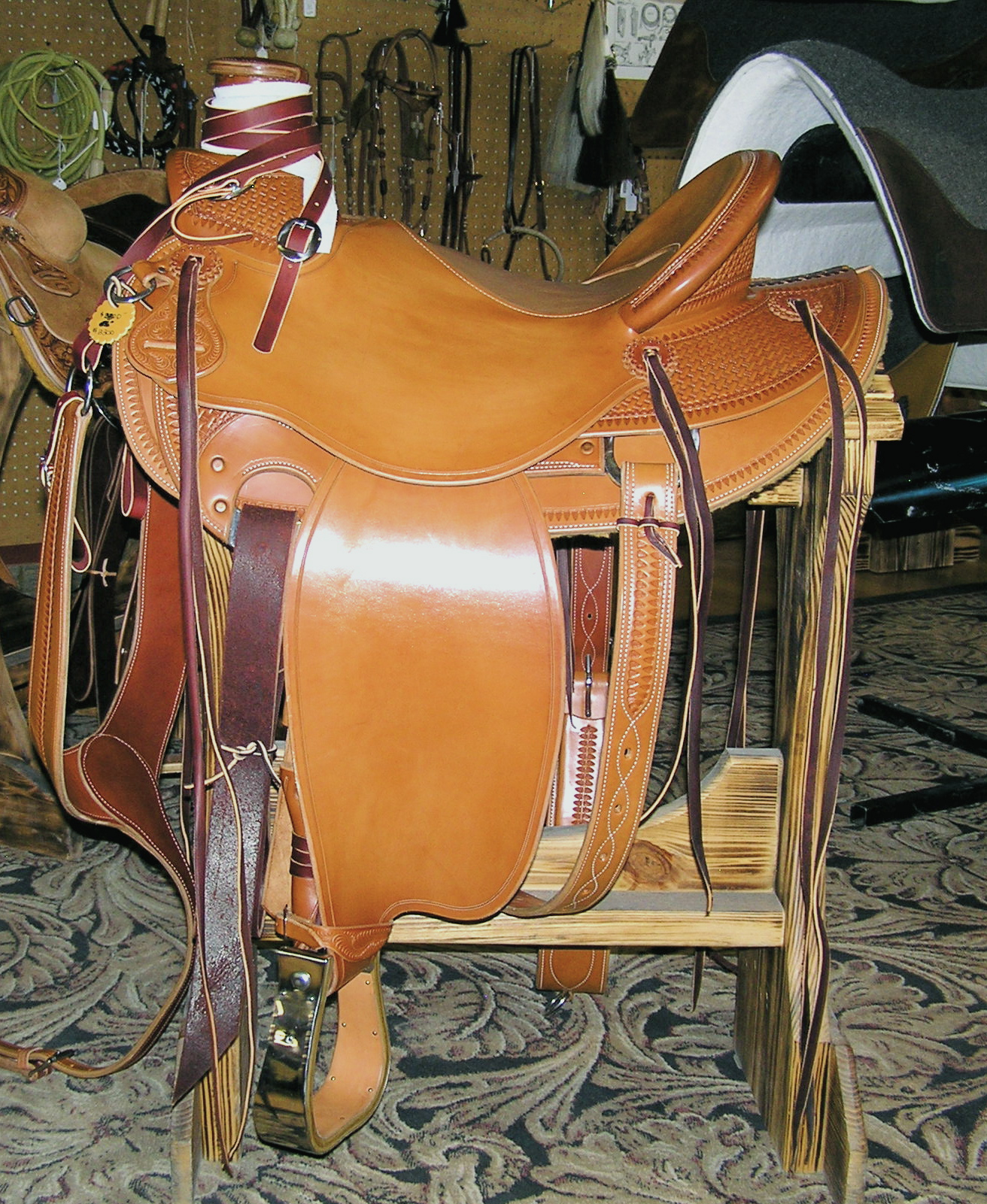
A classic "Wade" saddle, a tree style designed for working ranch horses

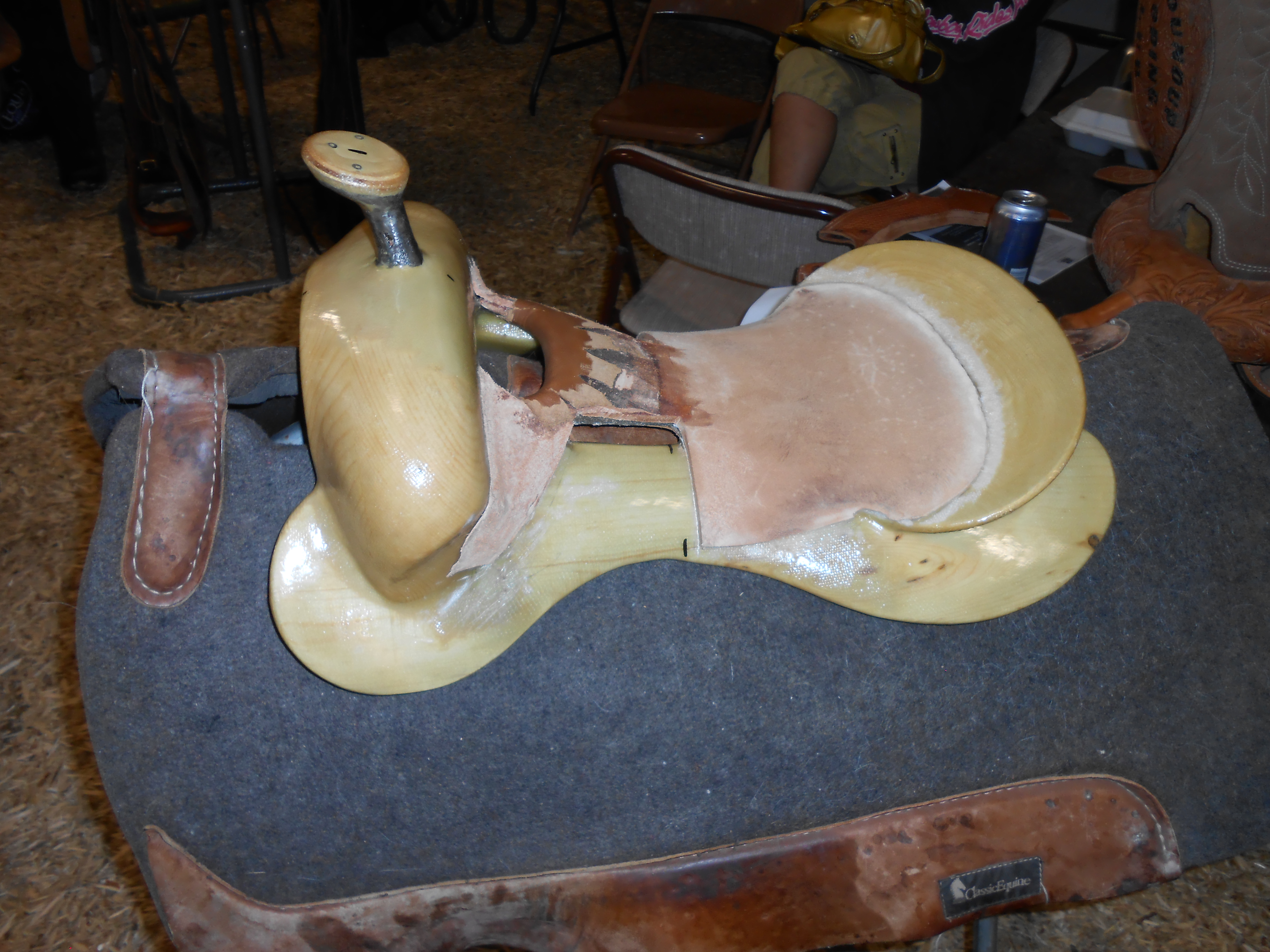
The tree for a western saddle. This one is a manufactured tree of pine covered in fiberglass, an inexpensive design.

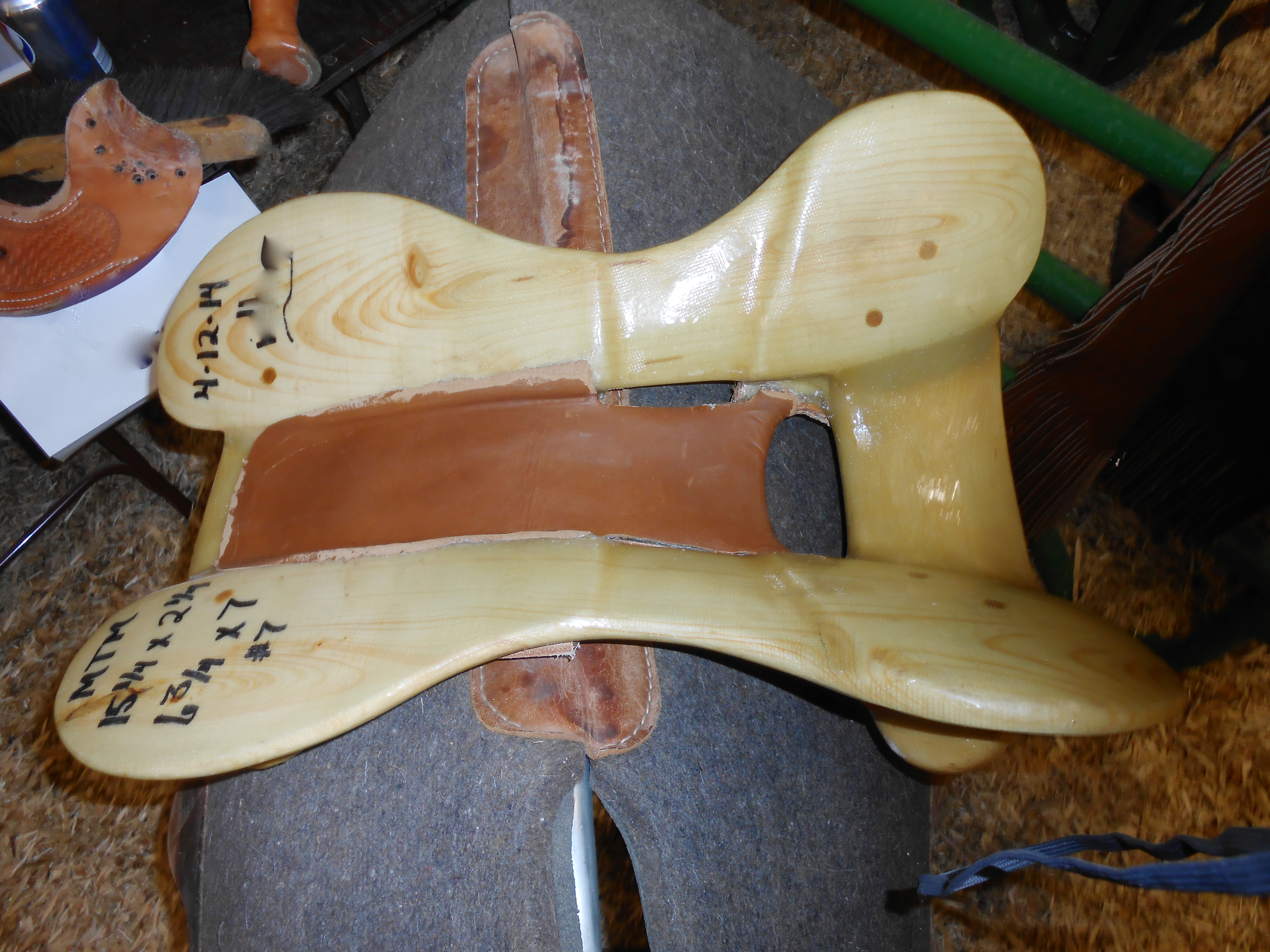
The underside of a tree for a western saddle

There are several different sizes of trees commonly found in saddles. Trees differ in the width of gullet and bars of the saddle, pitch of the bars (steep to flat, usually between an angle of 86 to 94 degrees with 90 being common), and length of the bars. The tree also influences the shape of the pommel and cantle on the seat on the saddle, though the seat can be altered to fit a rider by adding padding and other materials to a far greater degree than the fit of the saddle tree's bars on a horse. A wider gullet sits lower on the horse, while a narrow gullet sits higher and is designed to fit horses with higher withers. The bars form the primary loading surface of the saddle as it site on the horse's back. A horse with a flat back and widely sprung ribs will require bars with a flatter pitch than a saddle made for a narrow horse, where a steeper pitch to the bars will keep the saddle placed properly. Most saddles are made with pre-manufactured trees which come in a limited range of sizes. Custom-made saddles may be able to have further alterations made to a standard tree.

- Regular - If a manufacturer has a 'regular' barred saddle it usually falls between 5¾" and 6". Often 90 degrees
- Semi Quarter Horse - This type usually has a gullet width of about 6½ inches and steeper bars than most other trees. It is the narrowest common tree and, despite its name, fits many breeds of horse. Often 90 degrees
- Quarter Horse /Full Quarter Horse - Terminology varies with manufacturer, but overall design is intended to fit stock horse breeds such as the American Quarter Horse. This type usually has a gullet width of about 6¾ inches, but may be up to 7 inches. It usually has a flatter pitch than the Semi-Quarter horse tree. Different makers tend to give different gullet dimensions in Quarter Horse and Full Quarter Horse trees. Usually between 90 and 94 degrees
- Arabian - Depending on manufacturer, has a 6½" - 6¾" width gullet but a very flat pitch to the tree. Usually has shorter bars than Full- and Semi- Quarter horse trees. Intended to fit smaller horses with short but wide backs, such as the stock horse-type Arabian and Morgan.
- Haflinger (7½" gullet) are very wide, designed for semi-draft breeds such as the Haflinger horse, which are short-backed, heavy, low-withered horses. Often have a flat pitch (usually greater than 94 degrees) and very little rock.
- Draft - (8" gullet), are designed for riding Draft horses. Usually greater than 94 degrees
- Pony - narrow gullet, flat pitch to the bars, very short tree, designed for children and smaller ponies such as the Shetland and Welsh pony.

== Rigging ==
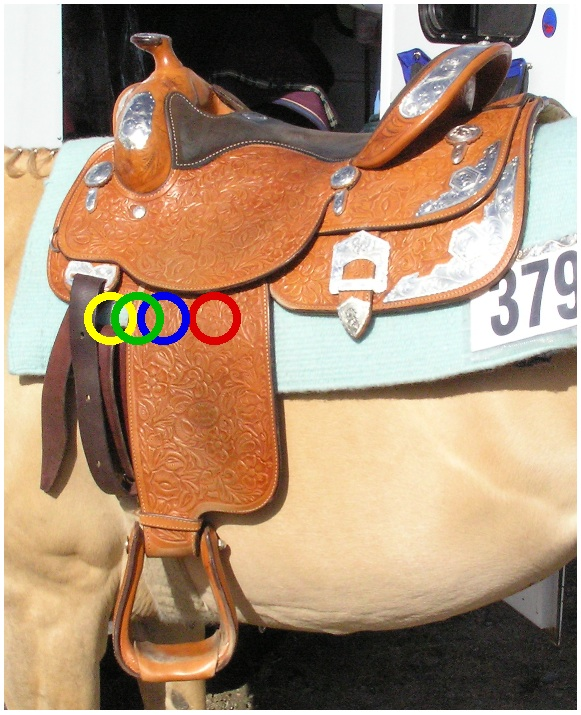
In-skirt rigging of a western show saddle, showing latigo and buckled cinch. The colored circles indicate the various options for placement of the rigging on a western saddle. The saddle shown has a "full" rigging position, shown by the yellow circle. The green circle indicates the placement of a 7/8 rigging, blue shows 3/4 rigging, and the red circle shows the historic "center fire" position.

Saddle rigging refers to the arrangement of rings and plate hardware that connects the billets and girthing system that holds the saddle on the horse. Western saddle rigging can be either single or double. The front rigging consists of metal "cinch rings" on each side of the saddle to which a long, wide strap called a latigo is attached for holding the front cinch that goes around the heart girth of the horse, just behind the elbows. The back cinch is placed around the widest part of the horse's barrel, and is attached to the saddle either by reinforced slots in the leather skirting of the saddle, or, in particularly heavy-duty models, to a second set of rings.

The front cinch is secured to the saddle by means of a latigo on the left, and on the right, by either a latigo or a billet. Latigos are not removed until worn out or broken. They run through the ring or buckle of the cinch (also called a cinch ring), and back to the rigging, sometimes multiple times for extra security. Modern latigos have several holes at the end so that a cinch can be buckled at a set tension, though the cinch may also be secured by a knot called a "latigo knot," which is a type of half-hitch. The off-side billet is a shorter, doubled piece of leather with holes along its length, somewhat heavier and less flexible than latigo leather. It runs through the rigging cinch ring and both ends buckle onto the cinch. Older saddles may use a latigo on the off side, but this is less common. Once adjusted to the horse, an off-side latigo or billet is seldom disconnected from the cinch, which remains attached to the saddle until it needs to be replaced, unlike the girth of an English saddle, which is to be removed on both sides when not in use. While leather is preferred for latigos, nylon web is sometimes used, particularly on cheaper saddles, though it is prone to slip when knotted and the holes may tear more easily.

When used, a back cinch, made of several thicknesses of leather, is held on by a simple heavy leather billet on each side of the saddle that buckles just tight enough to touch the underside of the horse, but not tight enough to provoke discomfort or bucking. At the belly midline, the front and back cinches are joined by a light belly strap, called a cinch hobble, that prevents the back cinch from moving too far back.

=== Rigging placement ===
A saddle that has only a cinch in the front is "single rigged". A saddle that has both a front cinch and a back cinch (sometimes called a flank cinch, even though it should never go around the horse's flanks) is "double rigged". The rear rigging is meant to stabilize the saddle. The back cinch is always located just below the cantle and held in place with a cinch hobble to prevent it from slipping back; however, the position of the front rigging varies. The rig positions are named by how far they are from the cantle to the fork. Placement of the front rigging is a critical component of western saddle design. The closer the rigging is to the center of the saddle, the more the rider will be balanced over the horse's center of balance, allowing freer movement and agility of horse and rider. On the other hand, the more forward the rigging is set, especially when combined with a back cinch, the more the saddle will set down on the horse, placing the rider a bit behind the horse's center of balance, but creating greater security.

- Full rigging refers to the most forward position, where the front cinch ring is placed located under the center of the fork or swells of the saddle. Spanish settlers of North America originally used full rigging, but without a back cinch, this type of rigging was a disadvantage because the saddle would rise in the back while traveling over rough terrain.
- Center fire is the rigging design placed closest to the center of the saddle. Historically, it replaced the full rigging. Center fire rigging is located halfway between the cantle and the fork and was always single-rigged. This type is rarely seen on western saddles today, but was used during the 1800s, and notably on the McClellan saddle of the U.S. Army. The Pony Express saddle also had center fire rigging.
- Modern saddles also use two additional positions, called "seven-eighths" (written 7/8) and "three-quarter" (written 3/4). 3/4 rigging is located three-quarters of the way from the cantle to the fork; thus halfway between center fire and full positions. 7/8 rigging is 7/8 of the way from the cantle to the fork; or halfway between 3/4 and full.
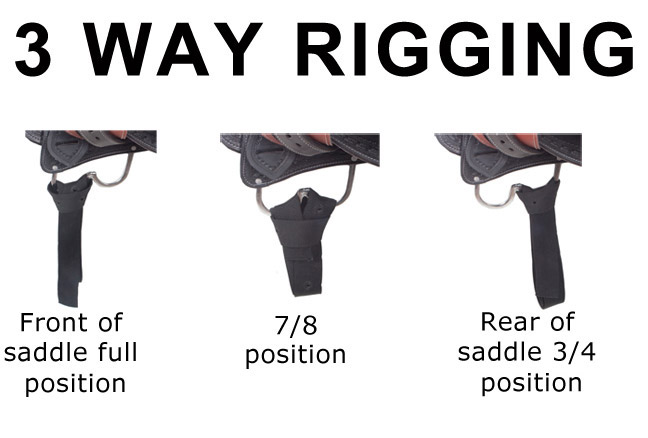
  One type of three way rigging (open three-way design) showing different methods of latigo attachment to achieve the desired position
- Three-way rigging utilizes various designs of multi-position cinch rings to combine the Full, 7/8 and 3/4 positions in one piece of hardware. Full position is achieved when the latigo is attached to the front ring. 7/8ths position has the latigo attached to both the front and the back ring, and the 3/4 position has the latigo attached at the back ring.
- Flank cinches were added after the rodeo sports of calf roping and team roping became popular. The flank cinch was added in order to keep the saddle from tipping in the back when a lasso was tied or dallied to the saddle horn. As a result, the 3/4 and 7/8 front rigging positions were also developed.

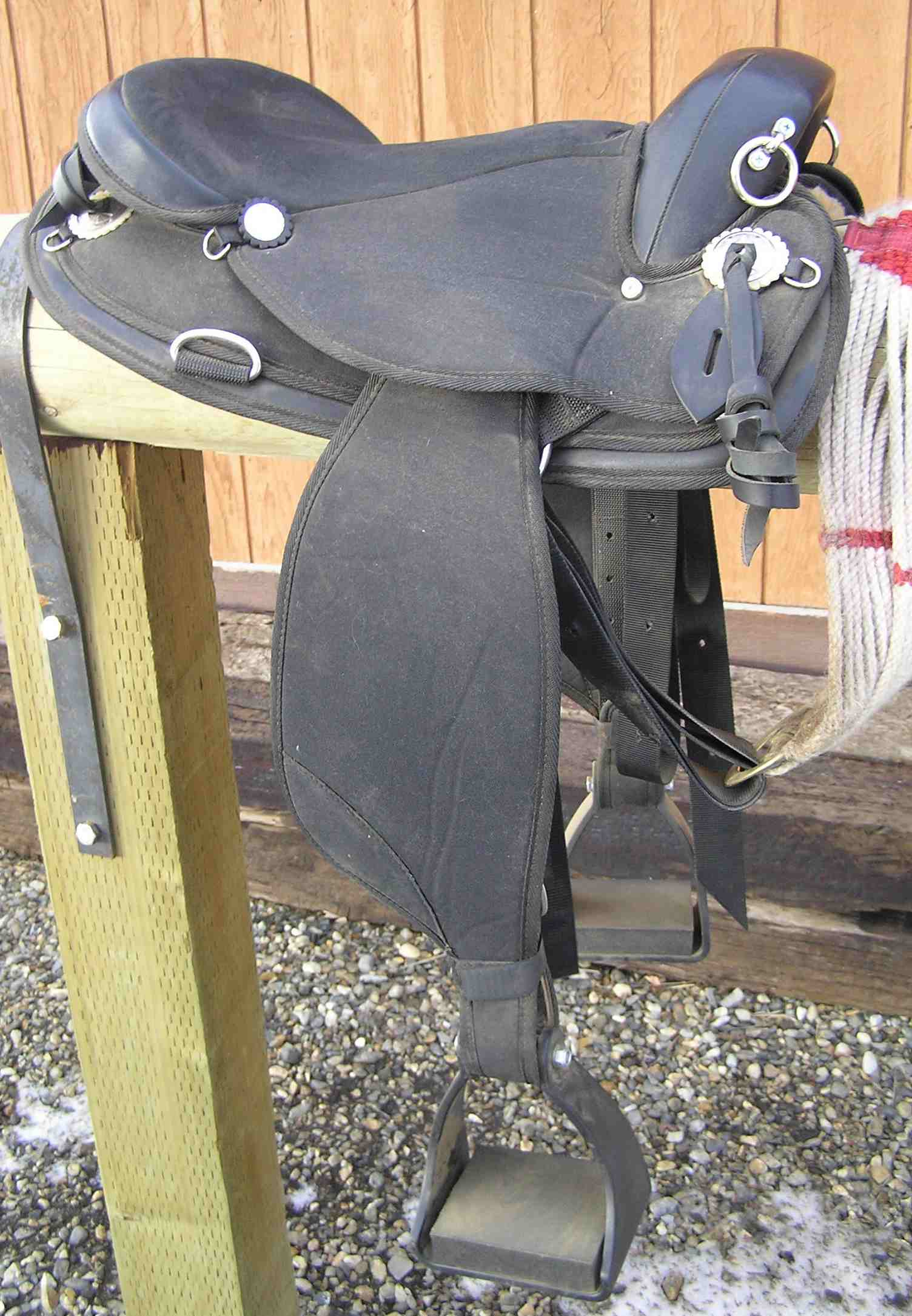
Endurance saddle, based on a western design, with a 3/4 rigging, placing the rider more directly over the stirrups and over the center of gravity of the horse. A similar tree without a horn is used for saddles used by saddle bronc riders.

Custom built saddles may be designed with any of the above rigging styles. Modern western saddles for riders who need speed and agility, such as barrel racing saddles, often have a 3/4 rigging, the closest placement to a center-fire rigging seen on modern saddles. The most popular modern rigging placement is the 7/8 rigging, which allows a rider to have a secure seat but more easily stay centered over a horse's center of balance and is often seen on saddles used for western equitation. A "full double" rigging is seen most often on saddles used for team roping, where the weight of the steer puts tremendous forward stress on the saddle, requiring rigging set well forward and both a front and back cinch to support the saddle. A few saddles are built with a three-way rigging plate that allows a saddle to be rigged in the full, 7/8 or 3/4 positions.

=== Rigging attachment styles ===
The front rigging is attached to the saddle in one of three ways: ring, flat plate or in-skirt. Ring rigging is made of rings on heavy leather straps attached directly to the saddle tree. This is the strongest attachment method, but a disadvantage is that it creates bulk under the legs and inhibits the free swing of the stirrups. The second style of attachment is the flat plate. This type has leather layers that are riveted around a metal plate and attached directly to the tree of the saddle. This is also a very strong type of ring attachment that reduces bulk under the leg and does not inhibit the swinging of the stirrups, though it is not as strong as ring rigging.

The third style is the in-skirt, where the rings or plates are attached directly to the saddle's skirt. The advantage of having an in-skirt rigging is that it provides the least amount of bulk under the leg compared to the other styles of attachment. Two variations exist, the built-in and the built-on. The "built-in" rigging design makes the attachment of the rings very strong by sandwiching the rings with layers of leather and then sewing and riveting them to the skirt. This design is strong enough for pleasure riding but not for roping. It has the least amount of bulk under the leg and is popular for show saddles. A "built-on" rigging attaches the plate to the surface of the skirt, a weak placement of low quality.

Historic saddles of the 19th century had rigging rings made of forged iron round stock, which would rust if it was exposed to the horse's sweat. The iron oxide would degrade and rot the leather that it came in contact with, which caused the rigging straps that were held by the rings to break. In order to correct this problem, saddle makers covered the metal rings in 4-5 ounces of medium thickness belly leather. This was a common remedy for the problem until approximately 1915, when brass rigging hardware became more common.

=== Western sidesaddle rigging ===
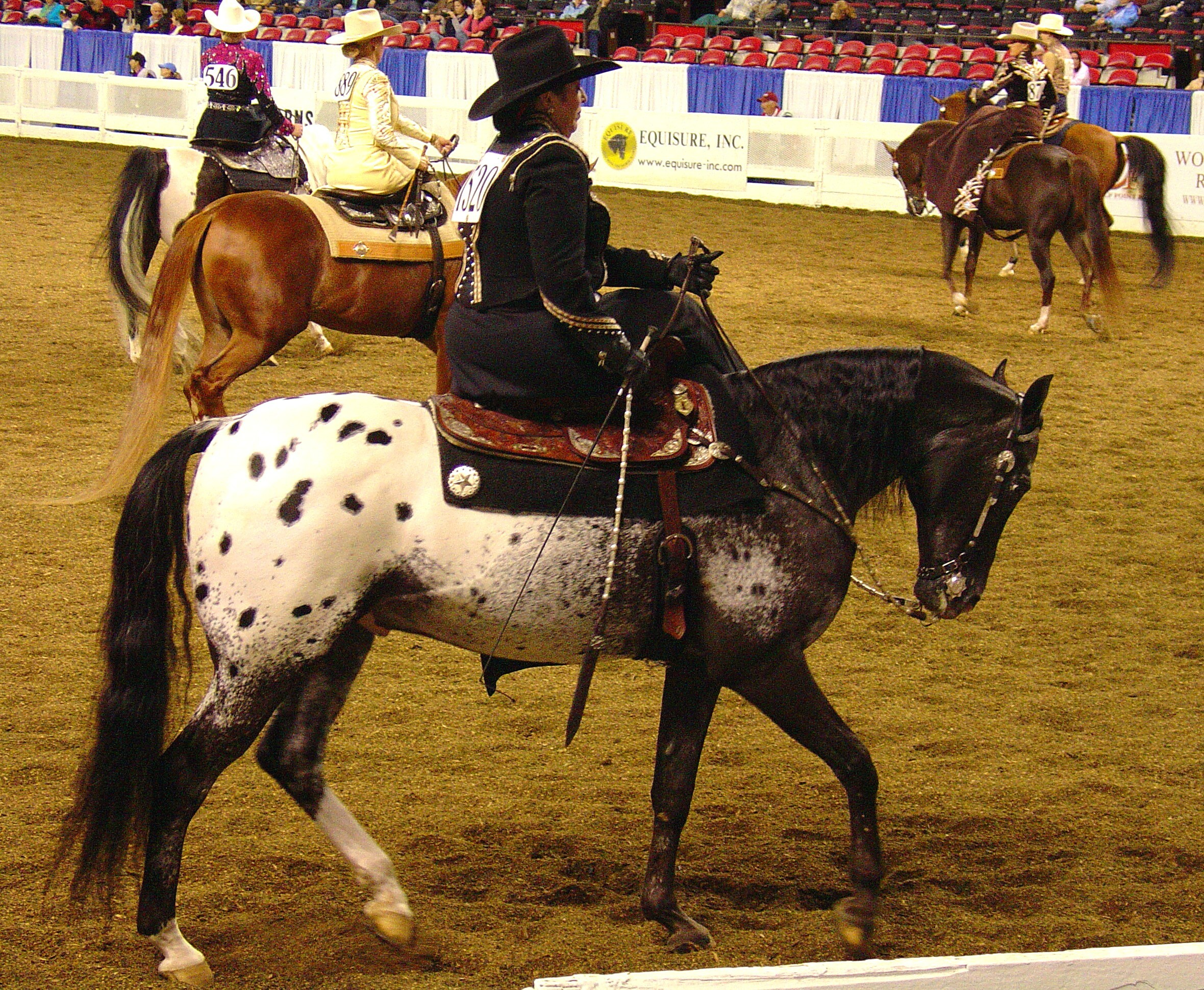
A modern western sidesaddle

The Goodnight western sidesaddle that was developed in the 1870s by Charles Goodnight for his wife was a double rigged design. Goodnight developed this sidesaddle because there was a need to produce a woman's saddle for daily riding and work on the range. The saddle also had to fit a variety of horses on a day-to-day basis. it required two cinches. The cinches have a connecting strap, called a cinch hobble, to keep the rear girth from slipping back, which would cause the horse to buck. The girthing system still produced a shimmy in the rear, even though the rear cinch was brought up snugly against the horse. The double girthing system was not as secure as the balance strap seen on many modern sidesaddles.

== See also ==
- Australian stock saddle
