= Saddle sore =

- Specialty: Sports medicine
- Symptoms: Skin abrasion
- Causes: Horse riding or cycling
- Prevention: Reducing friction

A saddle sore in humans is a skin ailment on the buttocks due to, or exacerbated by, horse riding or cycling on a bicycle saddle. It often develops in three stages: skin abrasion, folliculitis (which looks like a small, reddish acne), and finally abscess.

Because it most commonly starts with skin abrasion, it is desirable to reduce the factors which lead to skin abrasion. Some of these factors include:

- Reducing the friction. In equestrian activities, friction is reduced with a proper riding position and using properly fitting clothing and equipment. In cycling, friction from bobbing or swinging motion while pedaling is reduced by setting the appropriate saddle height. Angle and fore/aft position can also play a role, and different cyclists have different needs and preferences in relation to this.
- Selecting an appropriate size and design of horse riding saddle or bicycle saddle.
- Wearing proper clothing. In bicycling, this includes cycling shorts, with chamois padding. For equestrian activity, long, closely fitted pants such as equestrian breeches or jodhpurs minimize chafing. For western riding, closely fitted jeans with no heavy inner seam, sometimes combined with chaps, are preferred. Padded cycling shorts worn under riding pants helps some equestrians, and extra padding, particularly sheepskin, on the seat of the saddle may help in more difficult situations such as long-distance endurance riding.
- Using petroleum jelly, chamois cream or lubricating gel to further reduce friction.

If left untreated over an extended period of time, saddle sores may need to be drained by a physician.

== Saddle sore in animals ==
In animals such as horses and other working animals, saddle sores often form on either side of the withers, which is the area where the front of a saddle rests, and also in the girth area behind the animal's elbow, where they are known as a girth gall. Saddle sores can occur over the loin, and occasionally in other locations. These sores are usually caused by ill-fitting gear, dirty gear, lack of proper padding, or unbalanced loads. Reducing friction is also of great help in preventing equine saddle sores. Where there is swelling but not yet open sores, the incidence of sore backs may be reduced by loosening the girth without immediately removing the saddle after a long ride, thus allowing normal circulation to return slowly.
