= Latigo leather =

Kind of cowhide leather

Latigo leather is cowhide leather that is combination tanned. First it is chrome tanned, then it is vegetable tanned. Before modern combination tanning, latigo was combination tanned with alum and gambier.

Latigo is usually infused with oils and waxes. Techniques such as hot-stuffing, wet-stuffing, and fat liquoring are used to increase the amount of oil and wax the hide can hold. Oil/wax infusion and partial chrome tanning make the leather moderately flexible, less rigid than if fully vegetable tanned but more rigid than if fully chrome tanned. Because of its weight and special tanning process, latigo is among the most expensive cattle hide leathers.

In Western saddlery, the straps securing the cinches to the saddle rigging are called latigos, for the latigo leather used to create them. They are traditionally burgundy in color.

Latigo is frequently manufactured in weights of 8-12 oz., appropriate for use in belts and straps for bags and cases. Lighter latigos in the 3- to 7-ounce range are also manufactured, although in smaller quantities. Much Latigo is manufactured in black, or various hues of brown and red. However, latigos in brighter colors are also available, white included. Bright colors are achieved by bleaching of the hide prior to dyeing, and by application of pigment to the surface of the hide.
