= Bareback riding =

Horseback riding without a saddle

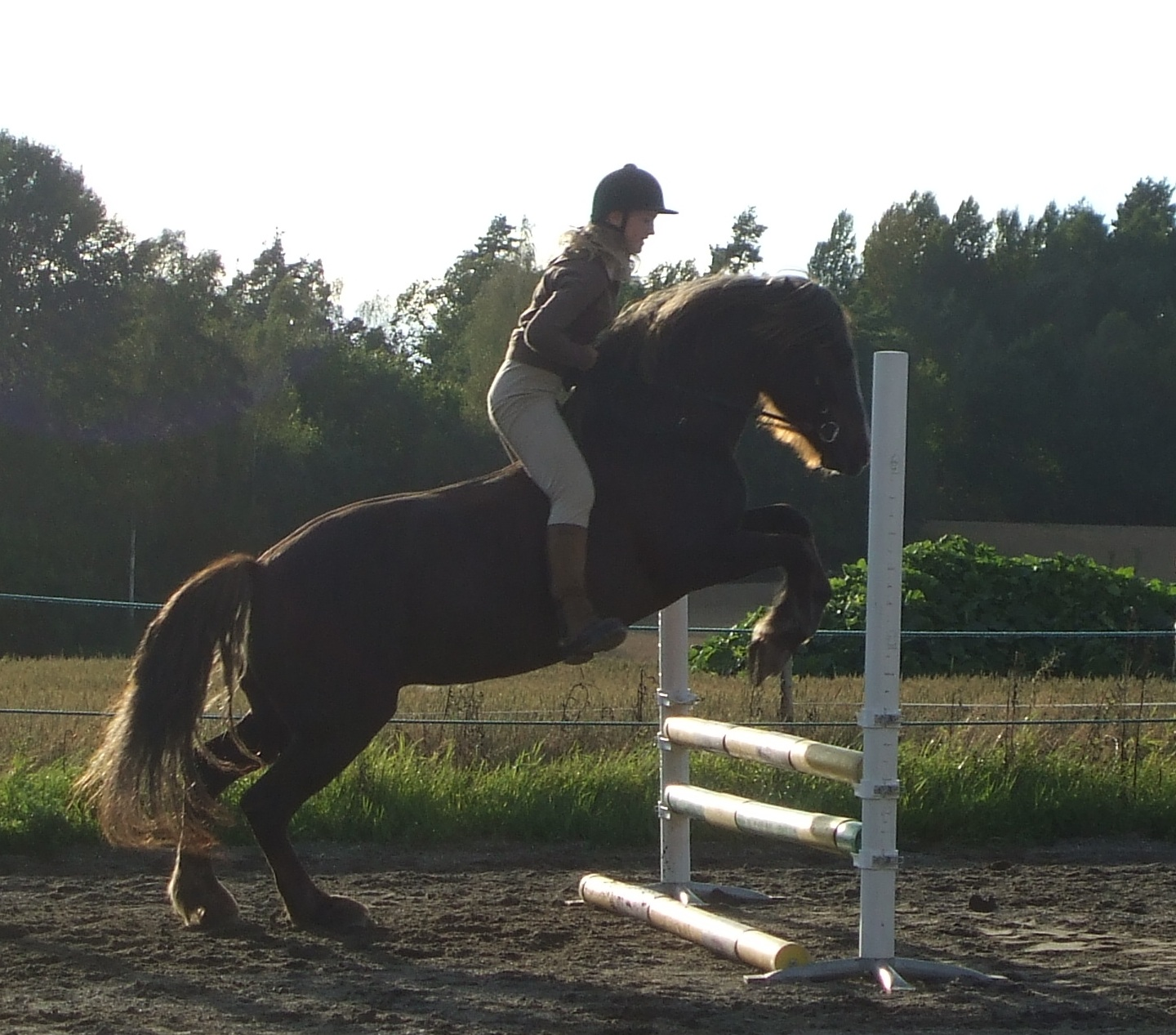
Riding bareback over a jump

Bareback riding is a form of horseback riding without a saddle. It requires skill, balance, and coordination, as the rider does not have any equipment to compensate for errors of balance or skill.

Proponents of bareback riding argue that riding in this fashion is natural, allows considerable communication with the horse, and improves a rider's balance. The drawbacks include a higher risk of injury due to an increased risk of falling off the horse, the potential to develop poor riding form, and the possibility of considerable discomfort to both horse and rider due to the absence of a supporting tree and any padding between the rider's seat bones and the horse's spine. Over time, it is more fatiguing to both horse and rider to ride bareback.

In certain situations, bareback riding is particularly suitable. Many riders ride bareback for a short distance to save time. It is also common for a rider who takes a horse in one direction and walks back on foot, such as when moving the horse between pastures, to ride the horse with just a bridle so they do not have to carry a saddle on the return. In other cases, for example, if a horse is allowed to swim in a river, lake or ocean, it is practical to leave expensive leather horse tack off to avoid damage. It is also common for riders in extreme cold weather to ride bareback for short pleasure rides in situations where heavy winter clothing makes it hazardous to ride with a saddle due to the difficulty of sitting correctly in a saddle while wearing thick insulated clothing or the potential of a large snow boot hanging in a stirrup.

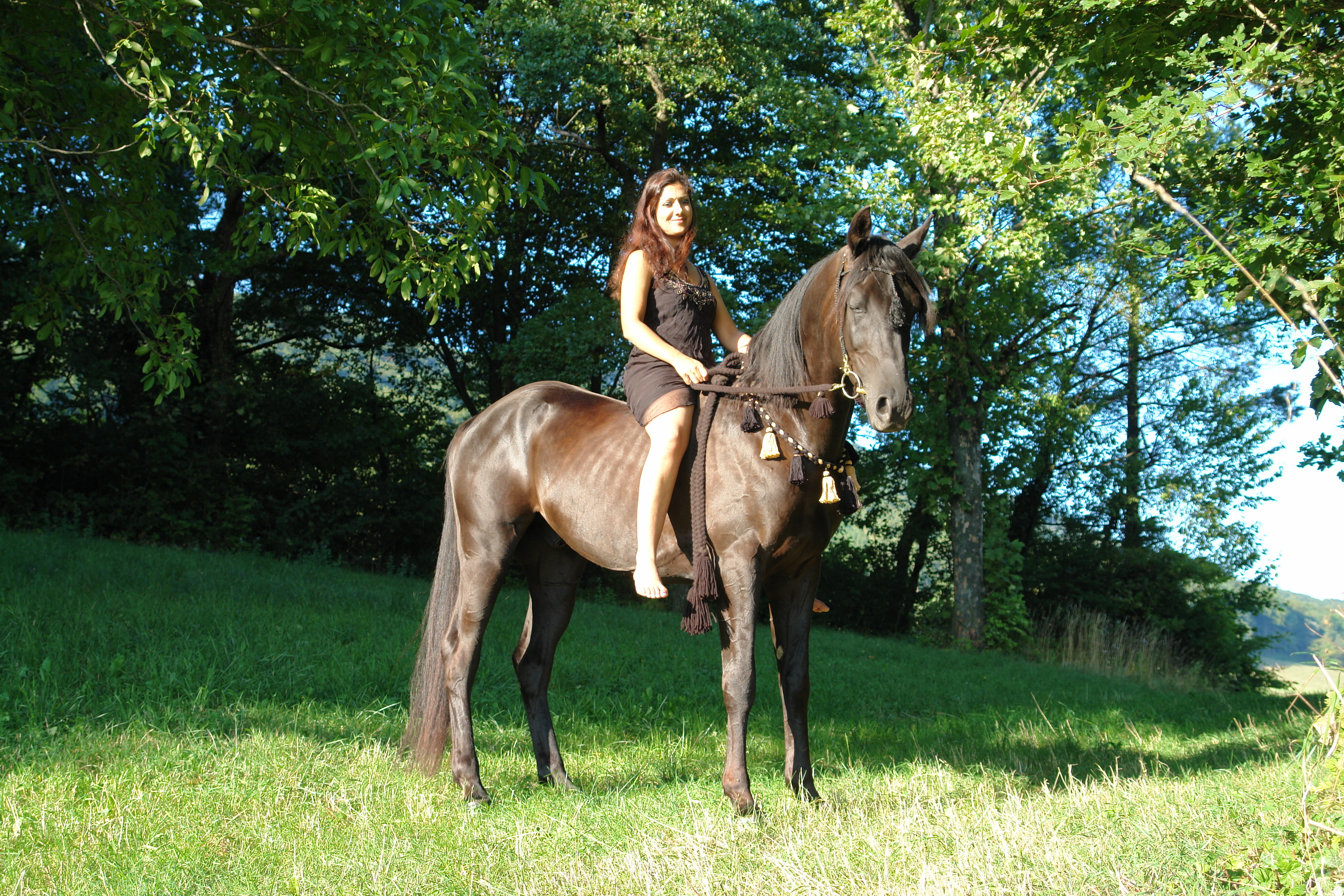
Bare back trail riding

== Rider position ==
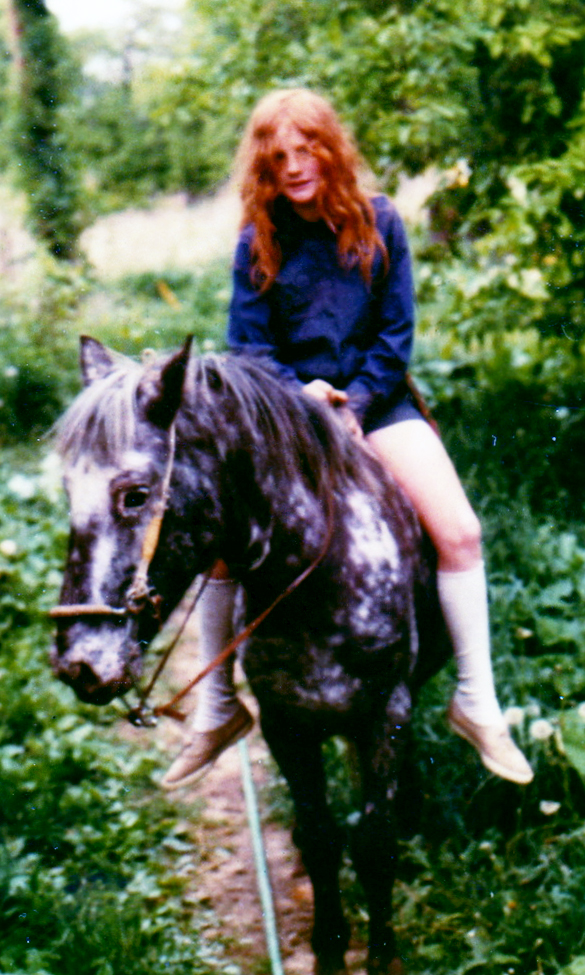
Informal riding without boots, long pants or an equestrian helmet is common, but raises safety concerns.

When riding bareback, riders sit a bit more forward on the horse than they would in a saddle. They must rest their legs more forward, along the crease between the barrel and the shoulder muscles to have a secure position without excessive gripping. As a rule, to make proper use of the rider's calf muscles, bareback riders keep their heels lower than their toes, riding with a flexed ankle and heel down, just as if they had stirrups. Riding with the toes down can lead to clutching at the horse with the lower legs or digging into the horse's sides with the heels, both often interpreted by the horse as a leg cue to go faster.

It is particularly important that riders do not squeeze their heels or lower legs into the horse's sides when slowing or stopping, or use the reins as a brace at any time, as these errors send the horse contradictory signals. If riders lose their balance, it is common to grab the mane to prevent jerking the horse in the mouth with the reins of the bridle, though ideally a rider can maintain proper balance by correct placement and use of their thigh and upper calf muscles.

Though some people begin riding bareback before they learn with a saddle, it is usually recommended to first learn in a saddle without stirrups, as the rider is still helped in obtaining correct position by the pommel and cantle, but is not able to use the stirrups as a crutch for poor balance or position. It is also easier on the horse's back to have the support of a saddle to cushion the action of an unbalanced rider.

== Pads ==
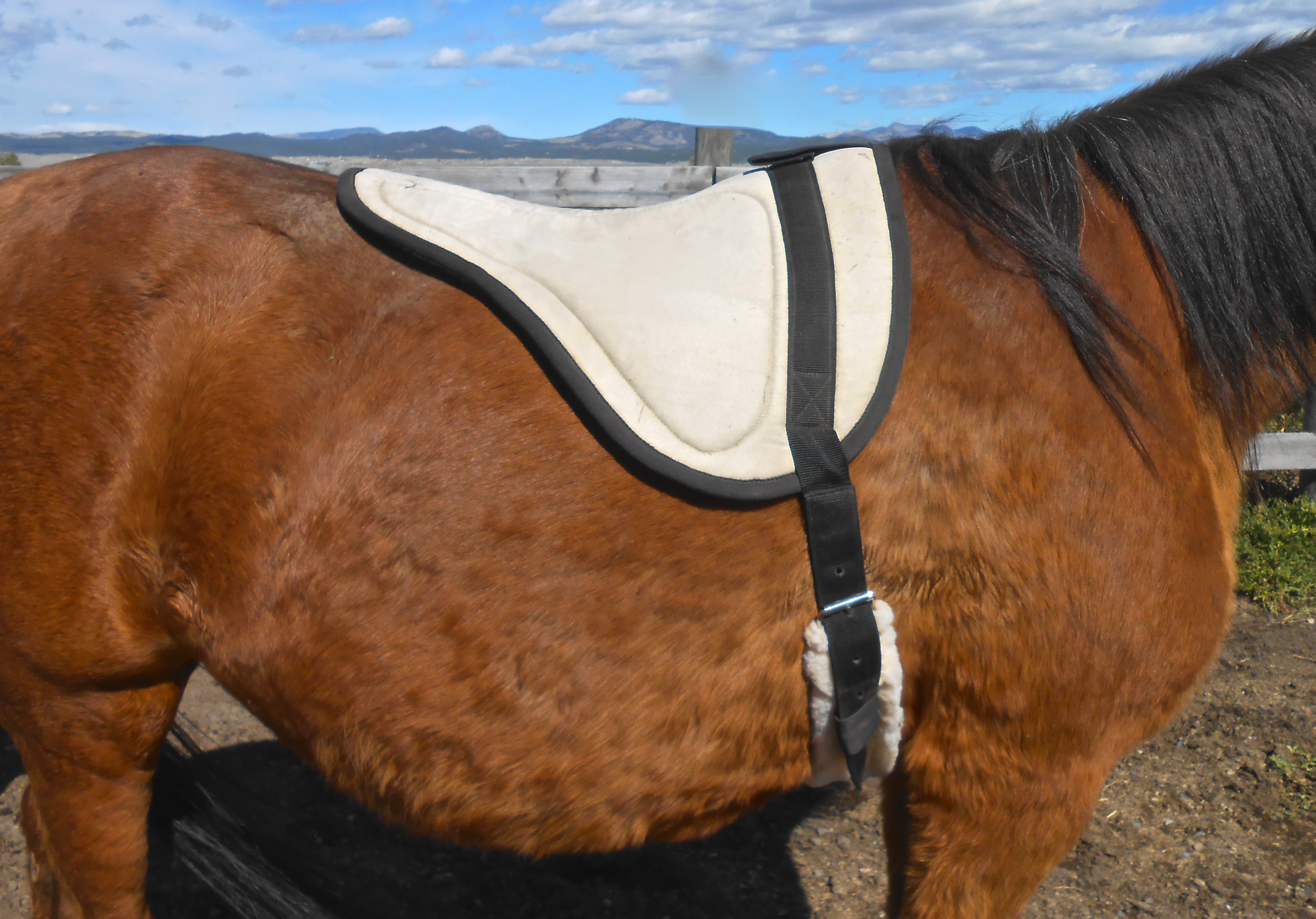
A horse with a bareback pad.

A bareback pad can be used to make bareback riding more comfortable for both horse and rider. The pad may also be used to help keep the rider's clothes clean. Bareback pads are often shaped like English saddle pads and are available in many colors and fabrics, most commonly felt, wool, or synthetic material. They are attached with girths. Some have stirrups, although these are associated with a higher risk of injury if a rider's foot becomes entangled in the stirrup during a fall. Pads with stirrups may also injure the horse's back due to lack of a tree. Bareback pads are also popular with individuals who believe that riding bareback creates a stronger bond between horse and rider. Bareback pads cannot be used as a substitute for a saddle and they can be prone to twisting around the barrel of the horse. Some instructors believe that a novice should never be allowed to go bareback until they have mastered riding with a saddle, and that bareback pads create a false sense of security; others feel that bareback is necessary to develop a new rider's balance, and the pads assist by keeping the rider from getting as sore as they would otherwise.

== Rodeo ==
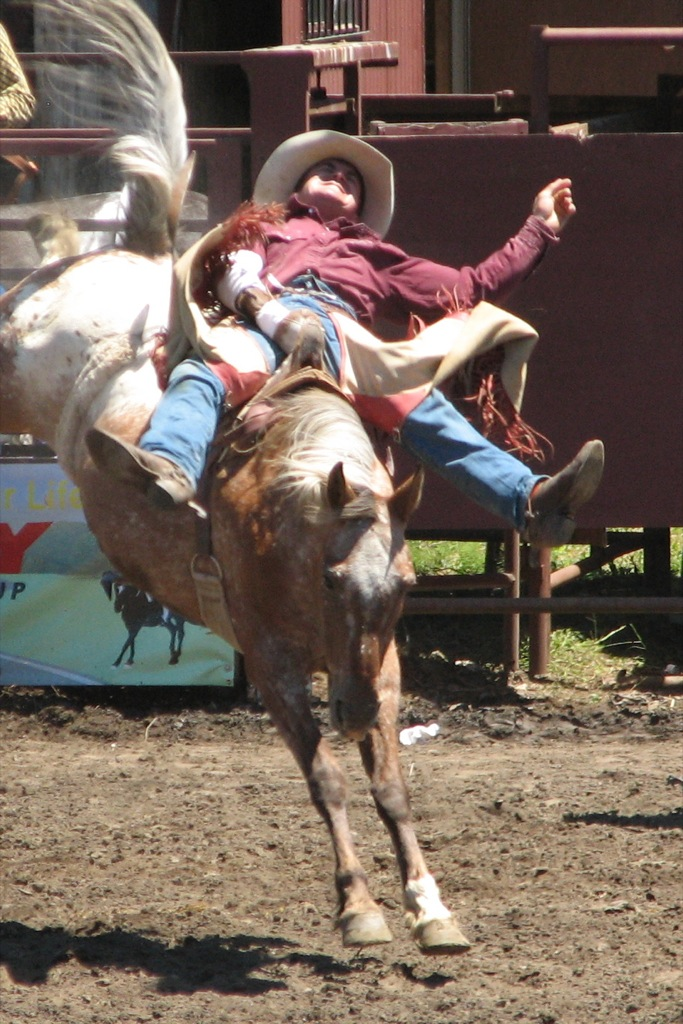
Bareback bronc riding

There is also bareback bronc riding in the sport of rodeo. It is one of the most physically demanding events in rodeo, with a high injury rate. Cowboys ride the bucking horse one-handed and cannot touch or hang onto anything with their free hand. They use a leather rigging that includes a handle that resembles that of a suitcase, where riders place their hand. To make the event more difficult for the rider, they are required to lean back and spur in a highly stylised manner that was never historically used in actual practice. The cowboy's spurs must be above the point of the horse's shoulders at the first jump out of the chute and touch the horse on every jump for the full-time required for a qualifying ride. They must stay on the horse and ride with proper technique for eight seconds for the ride to be judged and scored. Once the ride is complete the rider may hold on to the rigging with both hands until the pickup riders help them safely get off the still-moving horse. Cowboys are judged on their control and spurring technique, and the horse is judged on their power, speed, and agility. These two scores are added together to make the total, with the highest possible score being 100 points.
