= Mutton busting =

Event for children held at rodeos similar to bronc riding

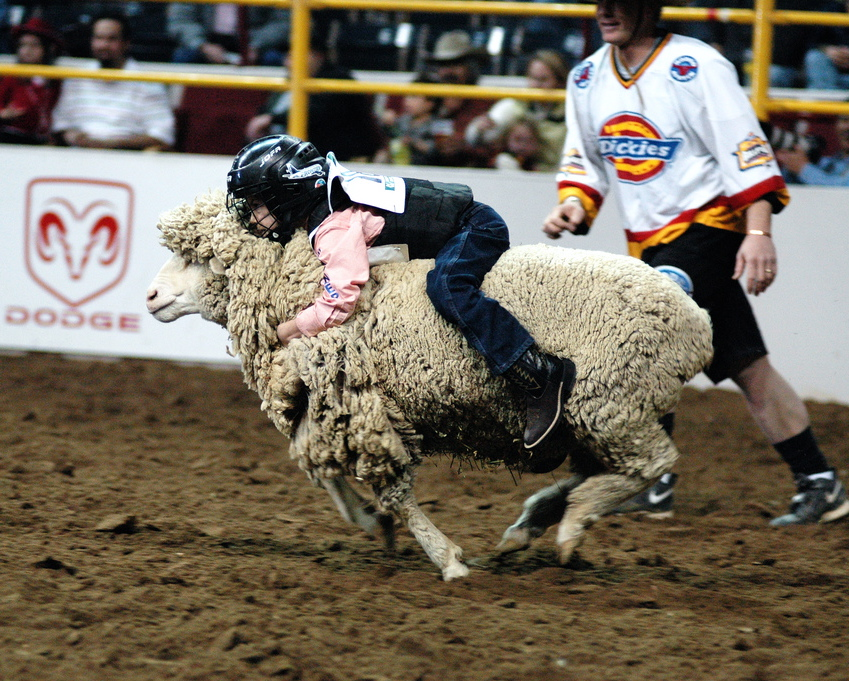
Mutton busting at the National Western Stock Show

Mutton busting is an event held at rodeos similar to bull riding or bronc riding, in which children ride or race sheep.

== Description ==
In the event, a sheep is held still, either in a small chute or by an adult handler while a child is placed on top in a riding position. Once the child is seated atop the sheep, the sheep is released and usually starts to run in an attempt to get the child off. Often small prizes or ribbons are given out to the children who can stay on the longest. There are no set rules for mutton busting, no national organization, and most events are organized at the local level.

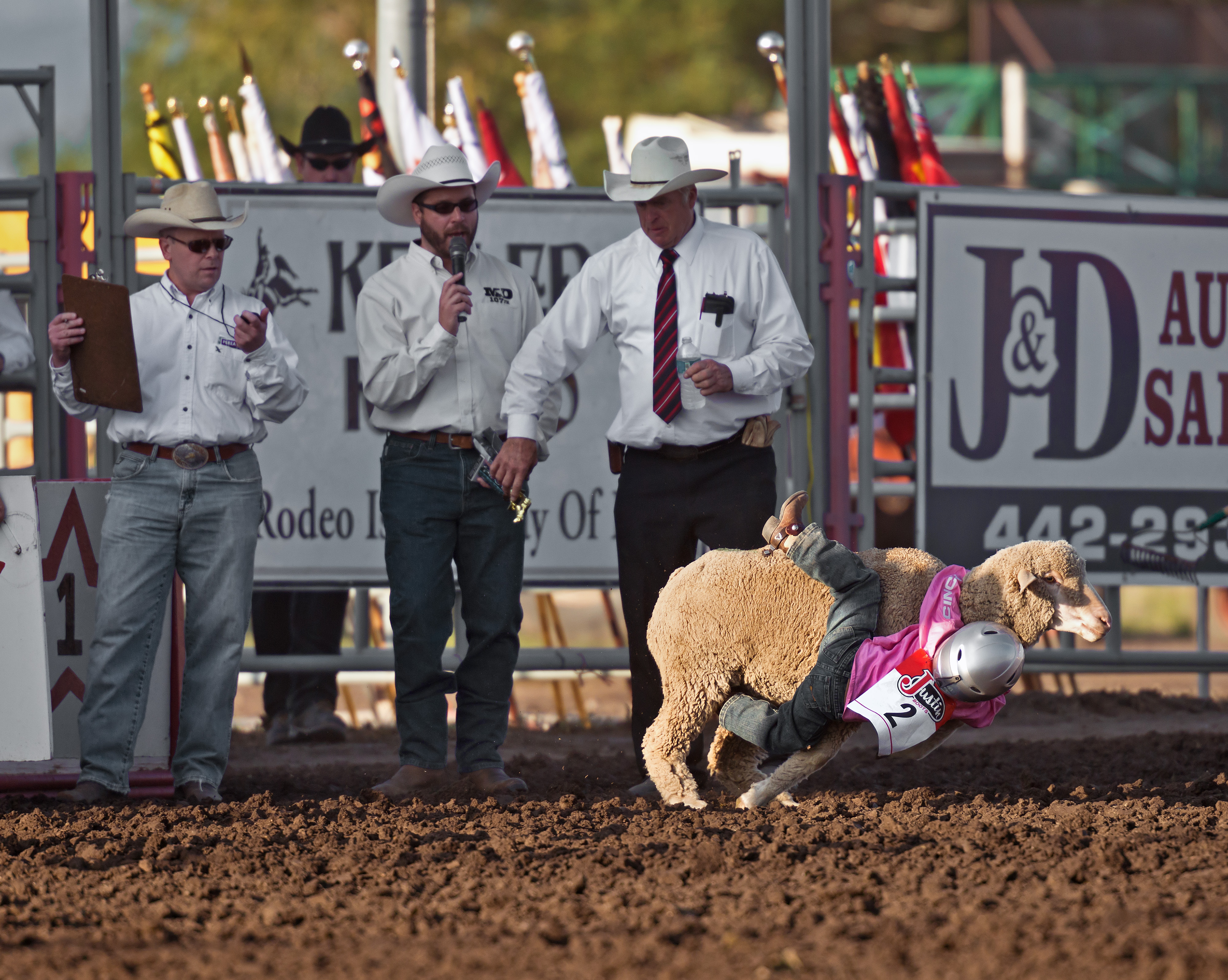
A contestant falling off the sheep

The majority of children participating in the event fall off in less than eight seconds. Age, height and weight restrictions on participants generally prevent injuries to the sheep, and implements such as spurs are banned from use. In most cases, children are required to wear helmets and parents are often asked to sign waivers to protect the rodeo from legal action in the event of injury.

== History ==
Mutton busting was first introduced by Jack Daines at the Daines Ranch Pro Rodeo, near Innisfail, Alberta, Canada, in the early 1960s. He wanted an event that would keep the younger children from riding the rougher stock. He brought some of the family sheep to the bucking chutes.

The practice has been documented as having been introduced in the United States at the National Western Stock Show in Denver, Colorado, United States, at least by the 1980s when an event was sponsored by Nancy Stockdale Cervi, a former rodeo queen. At that event, children ages five to seven who weighed less than 55 pounds could apply, and ultimately seven contestants were selected to each ride a sheep for six seconds. There are no statistics about the popularity of the sport, but anecdotal reports suggest thousands of children participate in such events every year in the U.S.

Supporters consider the event both entertaining and a way to introduce young children to the adult rodeo "rough stock" riding events of bull riding, saddle bronc and bareback riding, and may liken its rough-and-tumble nature to the way youth sports such as football are played. Organizations such as the ASPCA discourage the practice on the grounds that it does not promote kindness to, or respect of, animals.

The practice was banned in New York City in 2012 and in Alameda County, California, in 2019.

== See also ==
- Steer riding
- Miniature bull riding
