= Bull riding =

Rodeo sport

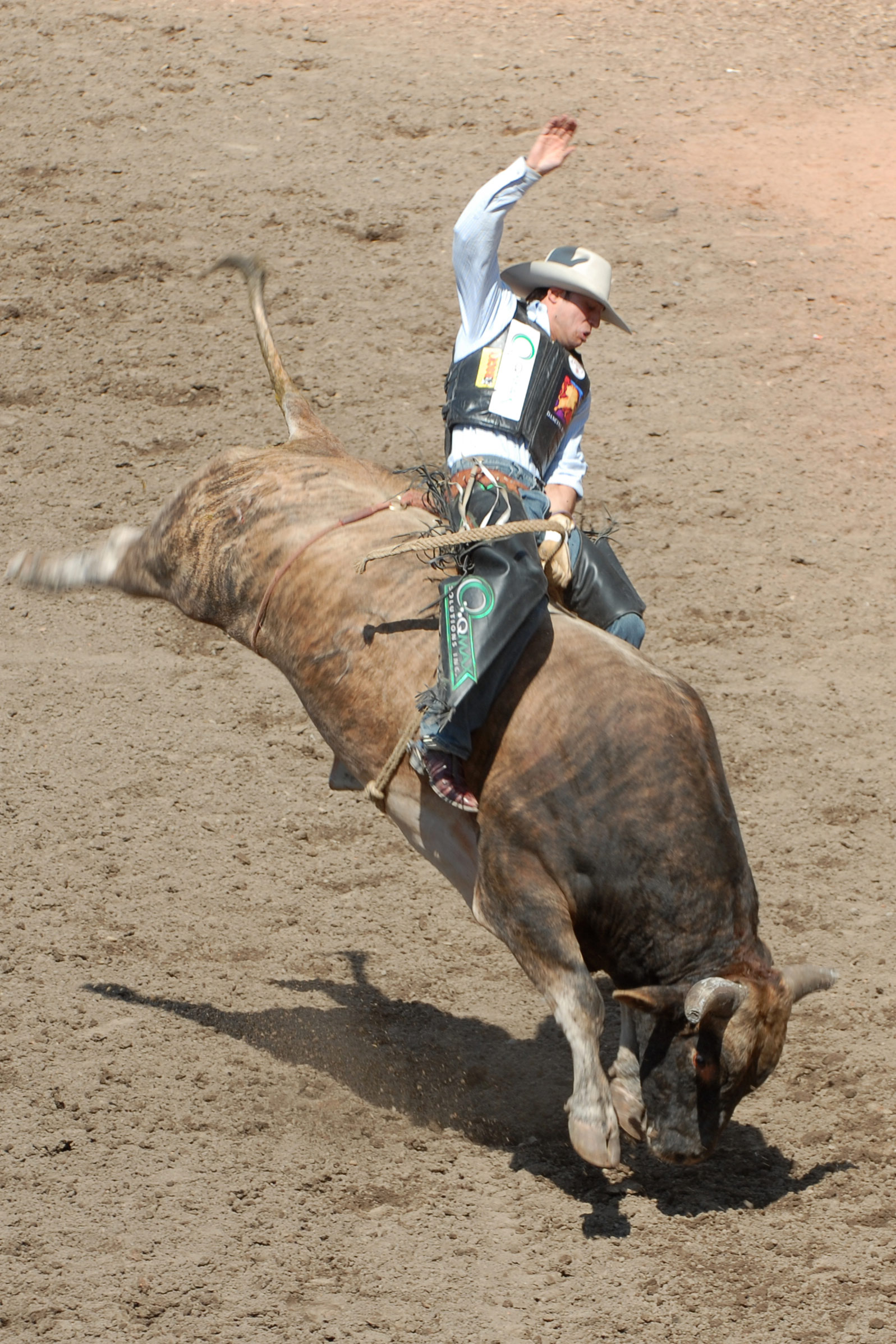
Bull riding

Bull riding is a rodeo sport that involves a rider getting on a bucking bull and attempting to stay mounted while the animal tries to buck off the rider.

American bull riding has been called "the most dangerous eight seconds in sports." To receive a score, the rider must stay on top of the bull for eight seconds with the use of one hand gripped on a bull rope tied behind the bull's forelegs. Touching the bull or themselves with the free hand, or failing to reach the eight-second mark, results in a no-score ride. Depending on the bull riding organization and the contest, up to four judges might judge the rider and four judge the bull on their performance. For most organizations, a perfect score is 100 points. In general, most professional riders score around the mid-70s to the high 80s.

Outside of the United States, bull riding traditions with varying rules and histories also exist in Canada, Mexico, Belize, Guatemala, El Salvador, Honduras, Nicaragua, Costa Rica, Panama, Puerto Rico, Cuba, the Dominican Republic, Colombia, Venezuela, Guyana, Ecuador, Peru, Bolivia, Brazil, Paraguay, Chile, Argentina, Uruguay, South Africa, the Philippines, Australia and New Zealand with the majority of them following similar rules, especially with the Professional Bull Riders (PBR) organization.

== History ==
Statuette of a Mexican charro bull riding, ca. 1830

The taming of bulls has ancient roots in contests dating as far back as Minoan culture. Bull riding itself has its direct roots in Mexican contests of equestrian, ranching and bullfighting skills now collectively known as charreada. During the 18th century, and probably before, Mexican bullfights consisted of traditional native games and exercises, different from those in Spain, which included roping, saddling and riding a bull like a horse, until it stopped bucking. In —Rusticatio Mexicana (1782)— Jesuit priest, Rafael Landivar, vividly described in epic verse, the riding of the bull during a traditional bullfight, including how another bull is let loose to confront the bull being ridden:

Sometimes a bull of great corpulence, remarkable in its strength, and a fury that threatens death, these people take out of the herd in order to saddle and ride it. A young man cinches his harness on his bristly back just like a horse, and surrounds his neck with a round rope, like neat reins with which he then, armed with just a rigid spur and his strength, impassively rides on the grim back of the reluctant bull. The bull, bellowing with rage, reacts to all sides, and tries madly to throw the rider off his back; he then attacks the auras from above with its curved horns, standing, upright, tall; or furious, kicking the air, he launches himself in a race, yearning towards the one who torments him; and while he tries to jump over the barrier of the concave Circus, he disturbs the whole stage, making the mob tremble. Like the Lion of Libya, badly wounded by a rigid blow, roaring, threatens ferociously with a look and bloody jaw, and showing his claws, attacks the cunning enemy, either by launching himself in a rapacious leap through the air, or by chasing the mob with a swift chase; not dissimilar, indignant, for such a strange load on his back, the bull rouses the whole arena, attacking some and others. But the young man, affirming his body, constantly dominates the bullish back, spurring endlessly his flanks. The young man with his effective right hand, mounted on the bull, rinskingly wielding a blunt spear, also orders, from the depths of the palisade fences, another bull to come out, which he joyfully torments with pricks throughout the rodeo. Suddenly, this bull is stunned before this strange figure, and dodges, in a winged run, his saddled partner. But at the moment, his flanks being pierced by a cruel spear, he flares up with rage and gores his opponent head-on, exchanging injuries between the two in fierce combat. On his part, the robust rider settles the fight with the spear, and continues energetically throughout the rodeo taunting the bulls, until they, sweating exhaustedly, let go of their anger and calm down.

Scottish noblewoman Frances Erskine Inglis, 1st Marquise of Calderón de la Barca witnessed Bull Riding while living in Mexico in 1839, and wrote about it in her book Life in Mexico (1843):

The skill of the men is surprising; but the most curious part of the exhibition was when a coachman, a strong, handsome Mexican, mounted on the back of a fierce bull, which plunged and flung himself about as if possessed by a legion of demons, and forced the animal to gallop round and round the arena. The bull is first caught by the lasso, and thrown on his side, struggling furiously. The man mounts while he is still on the ground. At the same moment the lasso is withdrawn, and the bull starts up, maddened by feeling the weight of his unusual burden. The rider must dismount in the same way, the bull being first thrown down, otherwise he would be gored in a moment. It is terribly dangerous, for if the man were to lose his seat, his death is nearly certain; but these Mexicans are superb riders. A monk, who is attached to the establishment, seems an ardent admirer of these sports, and his presence is useful, in case of a dangerous accident occurring, which is not infrequent.

Mexican Vaqueros Riding Wild Cattle in Buffalo Bill's Wild West Show (1885)

By the mid-19th century, charreada competition was popular on Texas and California cattle ranches where Anglo and Hispanic ranch hands often worked together.

Many early Texas rangers, who had to be expert horse riders and later went on to become ranchers, learned and adapted Hispanic techniques and traditions to ranches in the United States. Many also enjoyed traditional Mexican celebrations, and H. L. Kinney, a rancher, promoter and former Texas Ranger staged what is thought to be the first Anglo-American organized bullfight in the southwest in 1852. This event also included a jaripeo competition and was the subject of newspaper reports from as far away as the New Orleans Daily Delta. However, popular sentiment shifted away from various blood sports and both bullfighting and prize fighting were banned by the Texas legislature in 1891. In the same time period, however, Wild West Shows began to add steer riding to their exhibitions, choosing to use castrated animals because steers were easier to handle and transport than bulls. Additionally, informal rodeos began as competitions between neighboring ranches in the American Old West. The location of the first formal rodeo is debated. Deer Trail, Colorado claims the first rodeo was in 1869, but so does Cheyenne, Wyoming in 1872.

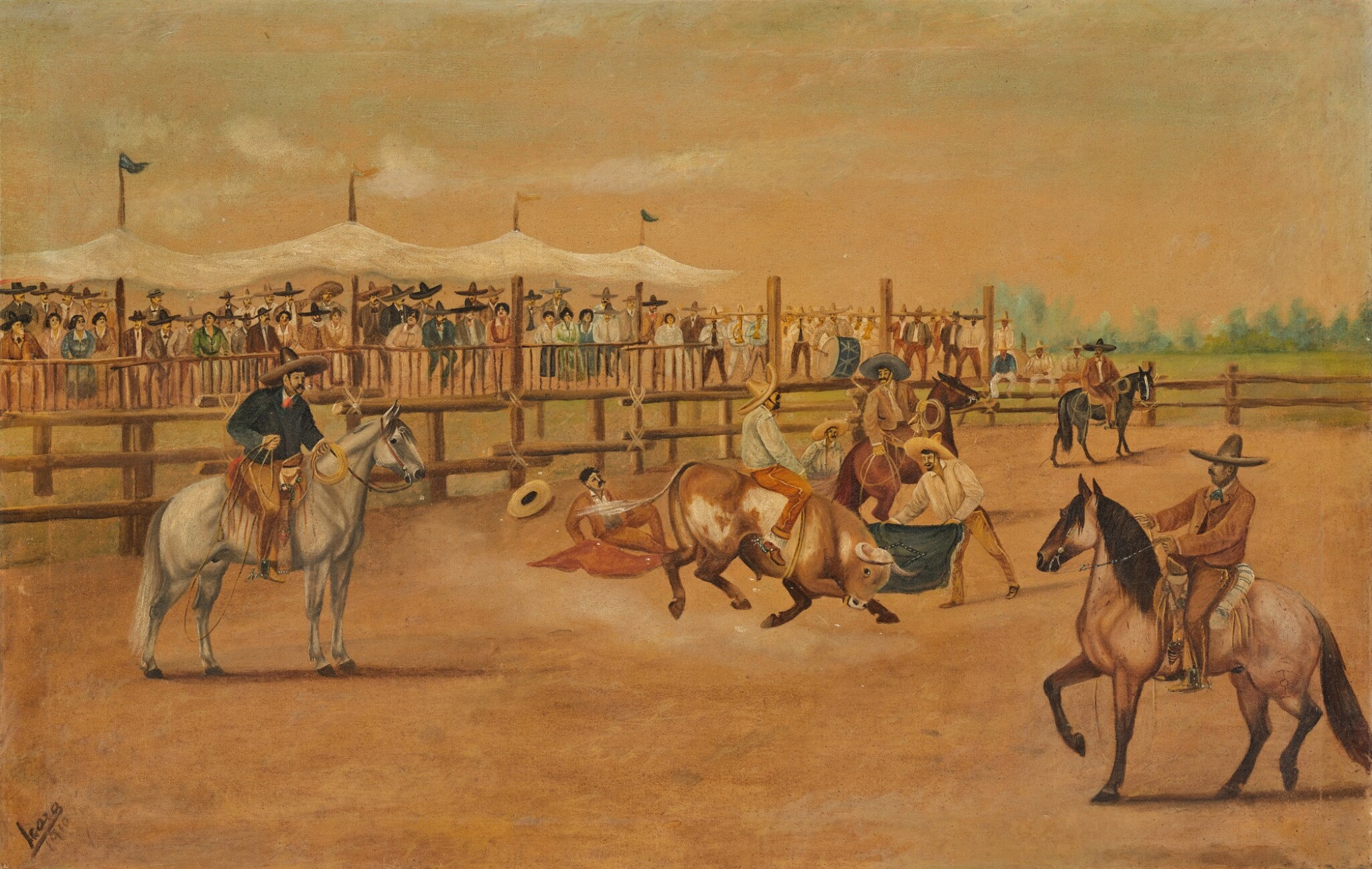
Charro bull-riding (1910)

Although steer riding contests existed into the 1920s, the sport did not gain popularity until bulls were returned to the arena and replaced steers as the mount of choice. The first-known rodeo to use brahma bulls was in Columbia, Mississippi, produced in 1935 by Canadian brothers Earl and Weldon Bascom with Jake Lybbert and Waldo Ross. This rodeo was the first to feature a bull riding event at a night rodeo held outdoors under electric lights. From these roots, bull riding as a competitive sport has spread to a number of other nations worldwide.

A pivotal moment for modern bull riding, and rodeo in general, came with the founding of the Cowboys' Turtle Association (CTA) in 1936, which later became the Rodeo Cowboys Association (RCA) in 1945, and eventually the Professional Rodeo Cowboys Association (PRCA) in 1975. Through this organization, many hundreds of rodeos are held each year. Since that time, the popularity of all aspects of the rodeo has risen. In addition to the PRCA, which has PRCA ProRodeo with bull riding and the Xtreme Bulls events for bull riding only, there is the Professional Bull Riders (PBR), which has staged events since 1993. The organization's championship event, the PBR World Finals, took place in Las Vegas, Nevada, for nearly 30 years. Since 2022, it has taken place in the Dallas–Fort Worth metroplex. In 2027, the second half of the PBR World Finals will be held in Glendale, Arizona. The PBR's major league tour, titled the Unleash the Beast Series since 2018, was previously known as the Bud Light Cup Series from 1994 through 2002, then the Built Ford Tough Series from 2003 through 2017.

== Rules and regulations ==
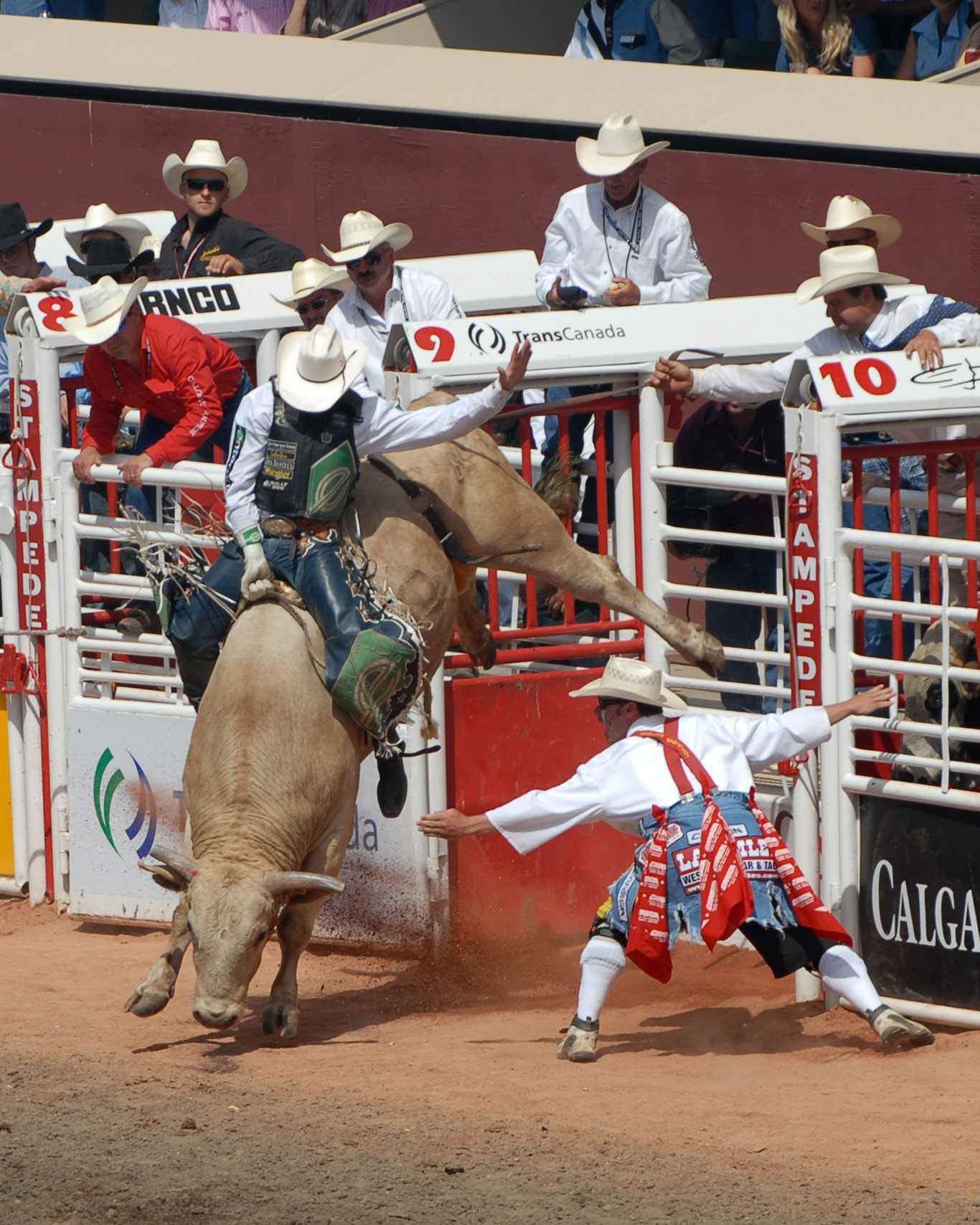
Bull riding at the Calgary Stampede; the "bullfighter" or "rodeo clown" is standing just to the right of the bull.

Each bull has a unique name and number called a brand used to help identify it. A sufficient number of bulls, each judged to be of good strength, health, agility, and age, are selected to perform. The rider and bull are matched randomly before the competition, although starting in 2008, some ranked riders are allowed to choose their own bulls from a bull draft for selected rounds in PBR events. In more recent times, bulls must have the tips of their horns shaved off and filed down so they are not sharp.

A rider mounts a bull and grips a flat braided rope. After they secure a good grip on the rope, the rider nods to signal they are ready. The bucking chute (a small enclosure which opens from the side) is opened and the bull storms out into the arena. The rider must attempt to stay on the bull for at least eight seconds, while only touching the bull with their riding hand. The other hand must remain free for the duration of the ride. Originally, the rules required a 10-second ride, but that was changed to the current eight seconds.

The bull bucks, rears, kicks, spins, and twists in an effort to throw the rider off. This continues for a number of seconds until the rider is bucked off the bull or dismounts after completing the ride. A loud buzzer or whistle announces the completion of an eight-second ride.

Throughout the ride, bullfighters, previously known as rodeo clowns, stay near the bull to aid the rider if necessary. When the ride ends, either intentionally or not, the bullfighters distract the bull to protect the rider from harm. The bull then exits the arena via the exit chute. If he refuses to leave, then the wrangler on horseback ropes the bull and takes him into the exit chute so the next rider can go. Some bulls, however, have a tendency to walk or run around the arena in a circle after bucking off their riders as a form of "victory lap" before exiting the arena.

Many competitions have a format that involves multiple rounds, sometimes called "go-rounds". Generally, events span two to three nights. The rider is given a chance to ride one bull per night. The total points scored by the end of the event are recorded, and after the first or first two go-rounds, the top 20 riders are given a chance to ride one more bull. This final round is called the "short go" or sometimes it is called the championship round. After the end of the short go, the rider with the most total points wins the event. A rider who had a disturbance during their ride can go to the judges themself and ask for a reride. The bull can fall, another bull gets out, someone interfered, or the bull did not buck are all reasons why a rider can be given a reride. With rerides they all run different. The rider may get the same bull or another one will be drawn at random.

=== Points and scoring ===
Scoring is done consistently within a rodeo organization. The two largest sanctioning bodies are the PRCA and PBR. They vary slightly in how they score bull rides. There are many other organizations, and each has its own particular rules on how they score, but most follow rules similar to the PRCA. The rider only scores points if he successfully rides the bull for eight seconds. The bull is always given a score. In the PRCA, a ride is scored from 0–100 points. Both the rider and the bull are awarded points. In the regular season, there are four judges, two judges scoring the bull's effort from 0–25 points, and two judges scoring the rider's performance from 0-25 points. There is the potential for the rider and the bull to earn up to 50 points each. The two scores are added together for a total ride score of up to 100 points. This system was spearheaded by former PRCA president Dale Smith. Scores of zero are quite common, as many riders lose control of the animal almost immediately after the bull leaves the bucking chute. Many experienced professionals are able to earn scores of 75 or more. Scores above 80 are considered excellent, and a score in the 90s exceptional.

In the PBR, a ride is scored from 0-100 points in total. Up to 50 points is scored for the rider and 50 points for the bull. The rider only scores points if he successfully rides the bull for eight seconds. The bull is always given a score. Four judges award a score of up to 25 points each for the rider's performance, and four judges award up to 25 points each for the bull's effort. Then all the scores are combined and then the total is divided in half for the official score.

Judges award points based on several key aspects of the ride. Bull riding rules require for judges to be former bull riders themselves. They look for constant control and rhythm in the rider in matching their movements with the bull. Points are usually deducted if a rider is constantly off balance. For points actually to be awarded, the rider must stay mounted for a minimum of eight seconds, and they are scored only for actions during those eight seconds. The ability to control the bull well allows riders to gain extra style points. These are often gained by spurring the animal. A rider is disqualified for touching the bull, the riding equipment, themself, or the ground with their free arm during the ride.

Bucking bulls have more raw power and a different style of movement than bucking horses. One move particular to bulls is a belly roll ("sunfishing"), in which the bull is completely off the ground and kicks either his hind feet or all four feet to the side in a twisting, rolling motion. Bulls also are more likely than horses to spin in tight, quick circles, and are less likely to run or to jump extremely high ("break in two").

For the bull, judges look at the animal's overall agility, power and speed; his back legs kick, and his front end drops. In general, if a bull gives a rider a very hard time, more points will be awarded. If a rider fails to stay mounted for at least eight seconds, the bull is still awarded a score. The PBR and PRCA record bulls' past scores so that the best bulls can be brought to the finals, ensuring that riders will be given a chance to score highly. Both organizations award one bull an award for the best bull of the year, decided by bull scores in both buckoffs and successful qualified rides. The award brings prestige to the ranch at which the bull was raised.

If a rider scores sufficiently low due to poor bull performance, the judges may offer the rider the option of a re-ride. By taking the option, the rider gives up the score received, waits until all other riders have ridden, and rides again. This can be risky because the rider loses their score and risks being bucked off and receiving no score. A re-ride may also be given if a bull stumbles or runs into the fence or gate.

In some PBR events that use an elimination style bracket, if both riders in a bracket fail to reach eight seconds, the rider who lasts longer advances to the next round. Otherwise, the rider with a higher score advances.

== Equipment ==
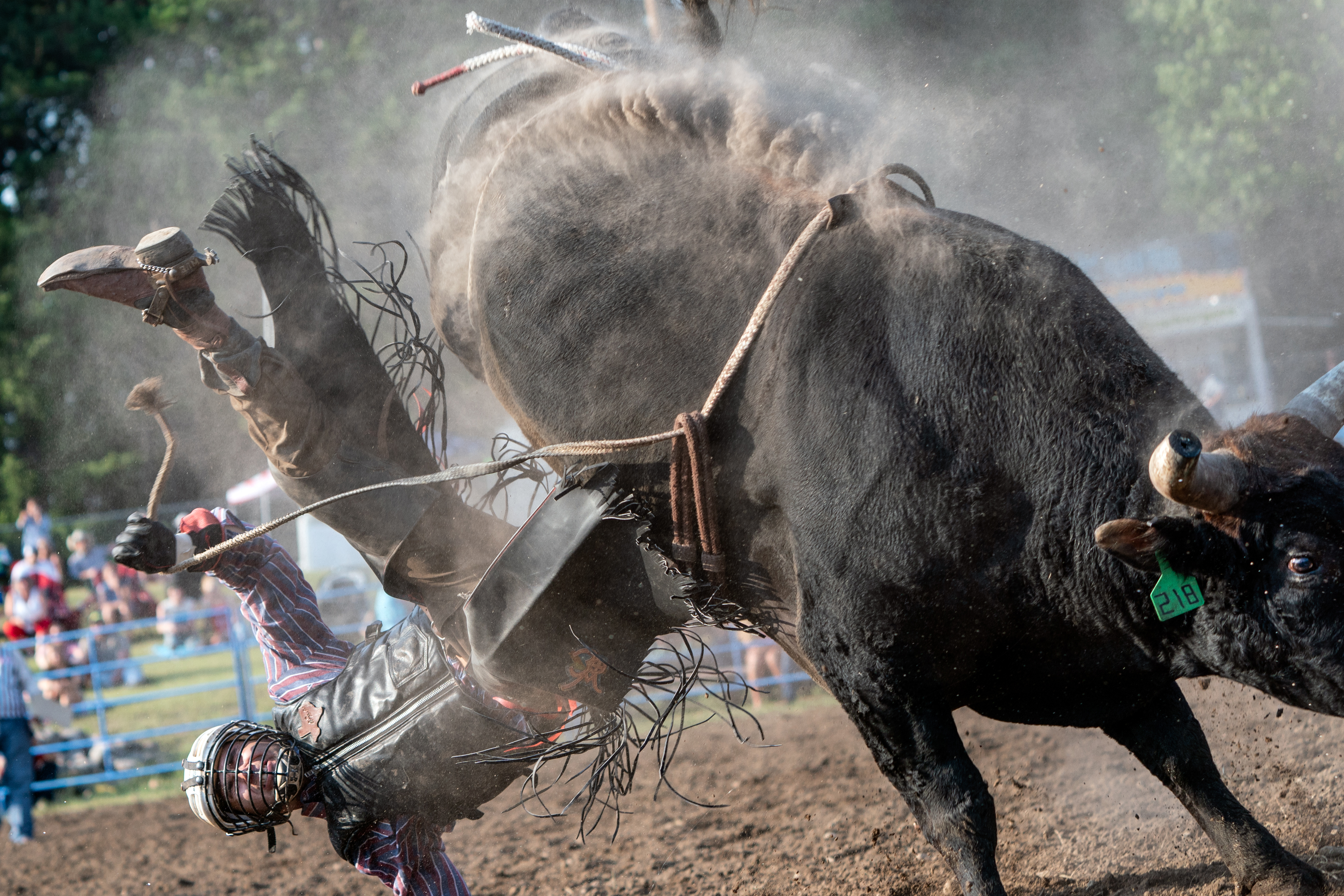
A rider in full gear being thrown from his bull.

Bull riders use many pieces of equipment both functionally and to ensure maximum safety, both to themselves and to the animals involved.

=== Bull rope ===
The primary piece of equipment used is the bull rope. It is a braided rope made of polypropylene, grass, or some combination. A handle is braided into the center of the rope and is usually stiffened with leather. One side of the rope is tied in an adjustable knot that can be changed for the size of bull. The other side of the rope (the tail) is a flat braid and is usually coated with rosin to keep it from sliding through the rider's hand. A metallic bell is strapped to the knot and hangs directly under the bull throughout the ride. In addition to the sound the bell produces, it also gives the rope some weight, allowing it to fall off the bull once a rider has dismounted.

=== Chaps ===
Chaps are probably the most noticeable piece of bull rider clothing, as their distinctive coloring and patterns add flair to the sport. Usually made of leather, chaps also provide protection for the rider's legs and thighs.

=== Vest ===
Bull riders wear a protective vest which is made of high density foam that allows the shock to disperse over a wide area, thereby reducing pain and injury. The vest's foam is covered with a ballistic material called Spectra, similar to Kevlar. It is then covered up with leather, giving it a western look.

Bull rider Cody Lambert was inspired to create a protective vest for fellow riders after witnessing the fatal injury of his friend and 1987 PRCA world champion bull rider, Lane Frost who died at the 1989 Cheyenne Frontier Days rodeo. After successfully riding his bull during the championship round, Frost dismounted and landed in the muddy arena floor. The bull then turned and pressed a horn against Frost's back and pushed him against the mud. Frost got up and took a few steps towards the bucking chutes and signaled for help. He then collapsed. He died on the arena floor before he could be transported to the hospital. No autopsy was performed, and it was assumed that when the bull pushed Frost against the ground, its entire body weight was on the end of its horn, breaking some of Frost's ribs and severing a main artery.

Lambert based the bull riding protective vest on the one worn by his brother who was a horse jockey. He debuted the vest at the California Rodeo Salinas in the summer of 1993, and for several months, he was the only bull rider using one. It was not until the spring of 1994 when other contestants began riding with vests. The number of bull riders with vests grew over the months, and by the autumn of that year, the vast majority of riders were using them. They were officially made mandatory for all contestants by 1996. Some bull riding vests also include a neck roll for protection to the neck, although very few riders use a vest with this modification.

=== Glove ===
To prevent a rope burn, riders must wear a protective glove, usually made of leather. It must be fastened to the rider's hand since the force the animal is able to exert could easily tear it away. The rider often applies rosin to the glove, which allows for additional grip.

=== Boots ===
Cowboy boots are worn with blunted and loosely locked spurs help keep the rider balanced and is crucial piece of equipment to the sport as a whole. The bulls are unharmed by the rowels, as their hide is roughly seven times thicker than a human being's skin. Truly skilled riders will often spur the bull in the hope of achieving extra style points from the judges.

=== Mouthguard ===
Many riders wear mouthguards, which are optional at the professional level.

=== Headgear ===
For most of bull riding's history, the primary headgear worn by contestants was cowboy hats. However, things started to slowly change during the latter years of the 20th century. Among the earliest bull riders to use protective headgear was 1982 PRCA world champion, Charlie Sampson. At an exhibition rodeo in Landover, Maryland, during the latter part of the 1983 PRCA regular season, Sampson suffered some major injuries after he was jerked down and his face collided with the bull's head during the ride, knocking him unconscious. The wreck cracked his skull and fractured nearly every bone in his face. As a result, he had reconstructive surgery. When the regular season ended, he had won enough money to qualify for the National Finals Rodeo in Oklahoma City in December. Against doctors' recommendations, he decided to compete at the event. However, his face was still recovering, so he rode at the event with a lacrosse helmet and a neck roll. When his face was healed up, Sampson went back to riding in a cowboy hat. However, he would suffer additional facial injuries throughout the rest of his career and rode with a helmet if his injuries were severe enough to warrant it. He would always go back to riding in a hat when healed up and never made a helmet a permanent part of his gear.

Into the 1990s, a small number of other professional bull riders began using protective headgear such as leather face masks with metal bars that they wore under their hats while riding or modified ice hockey helmets. Like Charlie Sampson, most of these riders only wore headgear while recovering from serious facial or head injuries, only to ditch it when healed up. Very few bull riders made protective headwear a permanent part of their gear. However, by 2003, though still a minority, helmeted bull riders were more common than ever. Many were now riders that did not necessarily suffer serious injuries, but who grew up riding with them for the sake of extra safety. The number of contestants who rode with helmets grew throughout the rest of the 2000s, especially during the latter years of the decade.

By the early 2010s, manufacturers were building helmets made specifically for bull riding. During the same time period, most up-and-comers were already riding with helmets. In 2013, the PBR made it mandatory that all contestants at their events who were born on or after October 15, 1994 ride with a full bull riding helmet. Those born before that date were grandfathered in and permitted to ride with a protective face mask underneath their hat or simply with their hat if so desired.

Public health researchers found evidence suggesting that bull riding helmets are protective, when riders wearing one particular type of helmet suffered approximately 50% fewer head and facial injuries.

In 2004, at the 1st International Rodeo Research and Clinical Care Conference in Calgary, Alberta, Canada, the licensed rodeo and bull riding medical personnel and clinicians recommended to the rodeo and bull riding associations mentioned in the agreement the mandatory use of helmets to all youth bull riders and the recommendation of helmets to all adult bull riders.

For competitors under the age of 18, mandatory protective headgear incorporating an ice hockey-style helmet is worn. Riders who use helmets as youths tend to continue wearing them as they reach adulthood and turn professional.

=== Bull equipment ===
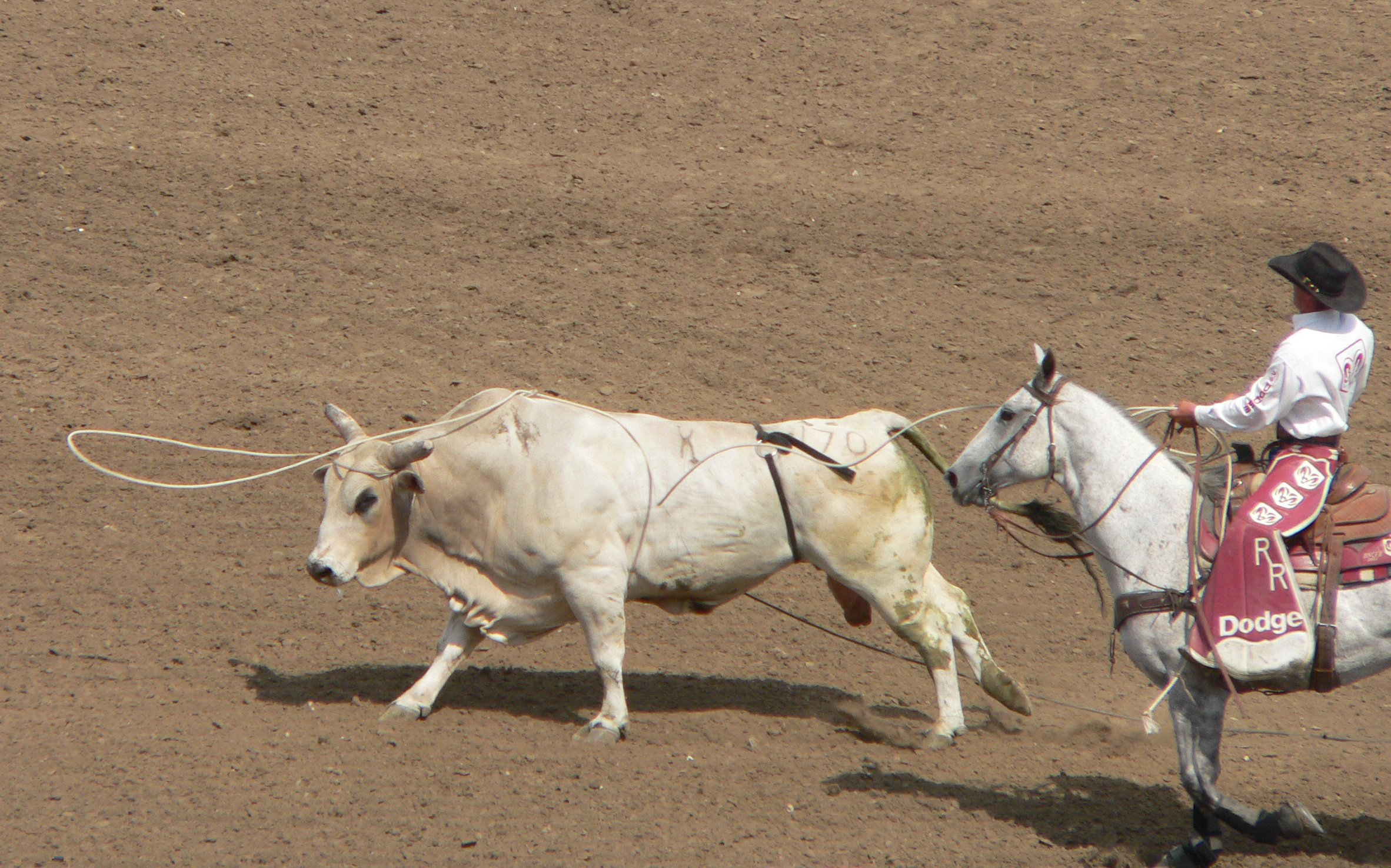
This bull is wearing a flank strap.

==== Flank strap ====
The flank strap is a soft cotton rope at least 5/8" in diameter and is used without extra padding like sheepskin or neoprene. It is tied around the bull's flank. Contrary to popular belief, the flank strap is not tied around the bull's testicles. This rope is to encourage the bull to use his hind legs more in a bucking motion, as this is a true test of a rider's skill in maintaining the ride. The flank strap causes the bull to buck in motions such as bucking side to side, jumping up and down, or kicking its legs in the air in a circular motion. If it is applied improperly a rider may request to ride again, as the bull will not buck well if the flank strap is too tight. The flank strap is applied by the stock contractor or his designate.

== The arena ==
The arenas used in professional bull riding vary. Some are rodeo arenas that are used only for bull riding and other rodeo events. Others are event centers that play host to many different sports. Common to all arenas is a large, open area that gives the bulls, bull riders, and bull fighters plenty of room to maneuver. The area is fenced, six to seven feet high or more, to protect the audience from escaped bulls. The fencing of the arena is metal fencing that has metal rods across it so that when the bulls buck and kick the fence they do not break the fence and end up in the crowd. There are generally exits on each corner of the arena for riders to get out of the way quickly. Riders can also hop onto the fence to avoid danger. One end of the arena contains the bucking chutes from which the bulls are released. An arena usually contains two to six bucking chutes. Especially for big events to keep it flowing the nights of the events. They load the bulls into all two to six chutes, releasing one at a time. There is also an exit chute where the bulls can exit the arena. Also in the arena, there will be two to four guys mounted on horses with ropes, and chaps on to rope the bulls and take them into the exit chute to help keep all people in the arena safe and keep the show moving. These men or women will lasso the bull around the head and neck and pull them into the exit chute where one of the workers will open the exit chute and put the bull back.

== North America ==
In the United States and Canada, most professional bull riders start out riding in high school rodeo or other junior associations. From there, riders may go on the college rodeo circuit or to one of several semi-professional associations including the Southern Extreme Bull Riding Association (SEBRA), the National Federation of Professional Bull Riders (NFPB), the Professional Championship Bull Riders Tour (PCB), the American Bull Riders Tour (ABT), Bull Riders Canada (BRC), the International Professional Rodeo Association (IPRA), the United Professional Rodeo Association (UPRA), the American Professional Rodeo Association (APRA), the Southern Rodeo Association (SRA), the Canadian Cowboys Association (CCA), among others. Bull riders compete in these organizations as they are climbing the ladder to the professional ranks and to supplement their income.

La Federación Mexicana de Rodeo (The Mexican Rodeo Federation) is Mexico's sanctioning body that includes all of professional American rodeo's standard events, including bull riding. Cuernos Chuecos (Crooked Horns) is Mexico's most prestigious stand-alone bull riding organization.

Professional bull riders can win in excess of $100,000 a year while competing in either the PBR or PRCA circuits.

== Australia and New Zealand ==
There are approximately 200 rodeos and bushmen's carnivals held annually across Australia. At most of these events bull riding is one of the featured competitions.

Initially bullocks and steers were used for roughriding events and these were owned by local graziers that lent them for these events. Nowadays bulls are used for the open events and stock contractors supply the various roughriding associations. Contract stock has produced a more uniform range of bucking stock which is also quieter to handle. The competitions are run and scored in a similar style to that used in the United States.

In May 1992, the National Rodeo Council of Australia (NRCA) was formed to promote and further the sport of rodeo and has represented the following associations, which also control bull riding:

- Australian Bushmen's Campdraft & Rodeo Association (ABCRA)
- Australian Professional Bull Riders Association (APBA)
- Central Rodeo Cowboys Association (CRCA)
- Indigenous Rodeo Riders Australia (IRRA)
- National Student Rodeo Association (NSRA)
- National Rodeo Association (NRA)
- Northern Cowboys Association (NCA)
- Queensland Rodeo Association (QRA)
- Rodeo Services Association (RSA)
- West Coast Rodeo Circuit (WCRC)

There are strict standards for the selection, care and treatment of rodeo livestock, arenas, plus equipment requirements and specifications.

Chainsaw was one of Australia's most famous bucking bulls. Only nine contestants scored on him and he won the Australian national title of Bull of the Year a world record eight times during 1987 to 1994.

Some of Australia's bull riders travel and compete internationally in Canada, New Zealand and the United States. Some of Australia's leading bull riders conduct bull riding clinics to assist learners and novice riders.

A World Challenge of Professional Bull Riders (PBR) was held on 29 May 2010 at the Brisbane Entertainment Centre (BEC). The 2010 PBR Finals were held over two nights at the Australian Equine and Livestock Events Centre (AELEC), with five top-ranked professional bull riders from the United States and 25 of Australia's best bull riders contesting the event.

== Animal welfare ==
There is debate between animal rights/welfare organizations and bull riding enthusiasts over many aspects of the sport. One source of controversy is the flank strap. The flank strap is placed around a bull's flank, just in front of the hind legs, to encourage bucking. Critics say that the flank strap encircles or otherwise binds the genitals of the bull. However, the flank strap is anatomically impossible to place over the testicles. Many point out that the bull's genes are valuable and that there is a strong economic incentive to keep the animal in good reproductive health. Further, particularly in the case of bulls, an animal that is sick and in pain usually will not want to move at all, will not buck as well, and may even lie down in the chute or ring rather than buck.

Critics also claim that electric cattle prods ("hot shots") are used to injure and torture bulls, while supporters of bull riding claim that the cattle prod simply gets the bull out of the chute quickly and is only a moderate irritation due to the thickness of the animal's hide. Cattle prods have not been used in the Professional Bull Riders (PBR) tour for several years. However, in smaller associations, a cattle prod is still sometimes used to ensure that the animal leaves the chute as soon as the rider nods their head. Cattle prods are not allowed by any major association.

Spurs are also a source of controversy, though modern rodeo rules place strict regulations on the type and use of spurs and participants point out that they are a tool commonly used in other non-rodeo equestrian disciplines. Spurs used in bull riding do not have a fixed rowel, nor can they be sharpened. The PBR currently allows only two types of rowels to ensure the safety of the animals.

== See also ==
- Steer riding
- Miniature bull riding
- Bucking bull
- Mutton busting
- Mechanical bull
- Jaripeo
- Jineteada gaucha
- Bronc riding
- Bucking horse

== Bibliography ==
- 2018 PBR Media Guide - Bull Riding Basics (PDF). Professional Bull Riders. 2018. Archived from the original (PDF) on March 2, 2019.
