= Miniature bull riding =

Rodeo sport

Miniature bull riding is a rodeo sport that involves a youth rider getting on a miniature bull and attempting to stay mounted while the animal attempts to buck off the rider. It is bull riding on a smaller scale, as both the bull and the rider are smaller than in professional rodeo. All competitors are under age 18.

Adult bull riding has been called "the most dangerous eight seconds in sports": it requires riders to stay atop a bucking bull for eight seconds with only the use of a rope tied behind the bull's forelegs. Touching the bull or himself with his free hand, or getting bucked off prior to the eight-second mark, results in a no-score ride. Two judges score the rider based on his ability up to 25 points each for up to a total of 50 points. Another two judges score the bull on his bucking performance for up to 25 points each for a total of up to 50 points.

Miniature bull riding has been called the "logical step" between steer riding and junior bull riding for young athletes. Although the bulls are smaller than is typical for bull riding, they are still half a ton in weight, which can result in injuries to riders such as broken bones. However, the parents and riders involved in the sport accept the risks.

== Early Development ==
Miniature bull riding traces part of its origins to the late 1990s.

In 1997, professional rodeo clown and barrelman Donnie Landis founded Lil’ Bucks Rodeo & Co. and organized one of the earliest documented competitions for youth riders on miniature bulls, held on October 4, 1997, as part of the Jr. Bullriders Tour in Jamestown, California, promoted as the “Home of the World’s Smallest Bucking Bulls.” A CNN Headline News segment broadcast on February 14, 1999, featured Lil’ Bucks Rodeo Competition in Jamestown, showcasing young contestants riding miniature bulls under Landis’s program. The segment serves as one of the earliest televised records of the sport’s organized youth division.

Landis later expanded the program into Lil’ Bucks Bull Co. and Roughstock101, continuing to produce events and training opportunities for young rodeo athletes across the United States.

== Comparison to other events ==
Children interested in pursuing bull riding have traditionally been started riding sheep, called mutton busting, prior to moving to bulls or steers. According to 12-year-old rider Caleb Griego, "staying on a sheep is more about squeezing with your legs and leaning to the front. Riding a bull takes a lot more technique. You gotta focus on keeping your legs down and staying over the front [of the bull]." One of his friends added that "it’s harder to ride a sheep because it has no kick to set you back up on the rope".

Some participants in the industry believe that miniature bull riding will revolutionize bull riding given that they are more effective preparation for traditional bull riding than alternatives like steer riding. Compared to steers, miniature bulls are broader, stronger and buck more, making them more akin to full-size bulls. The use of miniature bull riding as part of bull riding training for children "just may be a way to get on top in competitive bull riding".

== Miniature Bull Riding Association ==
The Miniature Bull Riders Association (MBR) was created in 2010 as a small stock contractor and had its own finals event in Las Vegas, Nevada, at the same place and time as the adult finals, the National Finals Rodeo. More than 50 riders from ages 6 to 14 compete in circuit events across the United States.

In 2011, two-time Professional Bull Riders (PBR) World Champion bull rider Chris Shivers became part owner of the MBR to help develop future PBR riders. As of February 28, 2015, the PBR became the presenting sponsor of the MBR. Shivers and Professional Rodeo Cowboys Association (PRCA) World Champion bull rider Mike White both have sons that competed on this tour.

== Tuff-N-Nuff Rodeo Association ==
Another organization, Tuff-N-Nuff Miniature Rodeo Association, brought miniature bull riding to the National Western Stock Show for the first time in January 2014. Johnny Hopkins, a retired professional bull rider who owned the association, used a scaled-down version of his circuit.

The Miniature Rodeo Association became the largest association in the world, and held multiple divisions for competitors based on age: tiny tots, 4 and under; pee wees, 5- and 6-year-olds; juniors, 7 to 10 years old; seniors, 11 to 14 years old; super seniors, 15 to 19 years old; and open, which was any age. "Putting them on their first bull or their first bucking horse, no matter what age they are, we have the livestock for getting them off to a good start," Johnny Hopkins said. "And we pride ourselves on that. We build their confidence one ride at a time."

Tuff-N-Nuff owned about 70 head of cattle, one of the largest herds in the industry. Hopkins deliberately purchased bulls that did not buck as much, and were therefore less attractive to most contractors, as he felt that "if they purchased bulls that the kids could ride and learn on and build their confidence, they would get along so much better than if the kids were bucked off all the time".

The Hopkins also added other types of miniature events. In 2015, they added the Miniature Rodeo World Tour. The organization, its events, and tour continued to evolve.
