= Bucking =

Kicking motion performed by cattle and horses

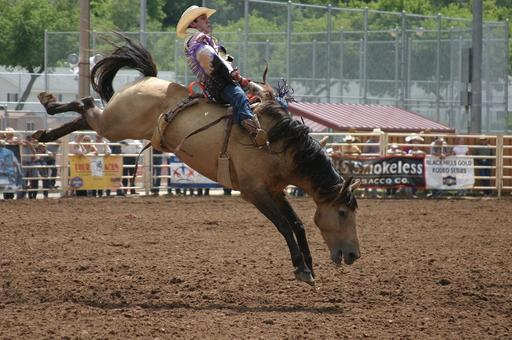
A rodeo horse, bucking.

Bucking is a movement performed by an animal in which it lowers its head and raises its hindquarters into the air while kicking out with the hind legs. It is most commonly seen in herbivores such as equines, cattle, deer, goats, and sheep. Most research on this behavior has been directed towards horses and cattle.

Bucking can vary in intensity from the animals' slight elevation of both hind legs, to lowering their head between their front legs, arching their back, and kicking out several times. Originally, it was predominantly an anti-predator and play behavior, but with domestication, it is now also a behavioral issue in riding horses, and a desired behavior in bucking horses and bulls. If powerful, it may unseat or even throw off a rider, and can seriously injure either animal, rider, or both.

== Reasons for bucking ==
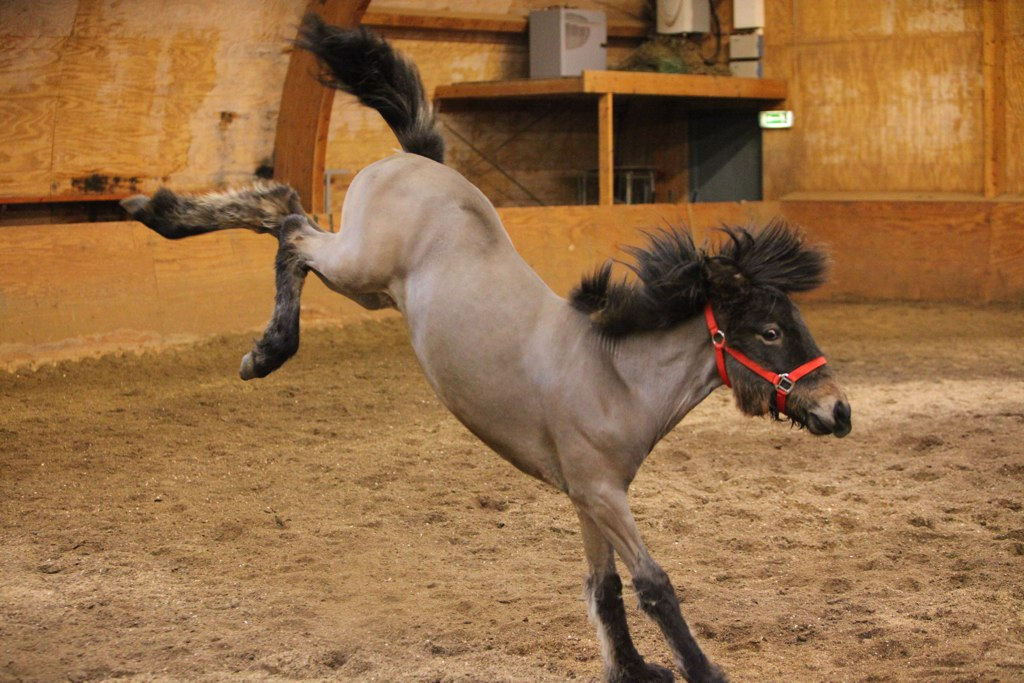
A loose horse may buck due to aggression or fear, as the very high kick of this horse suggests

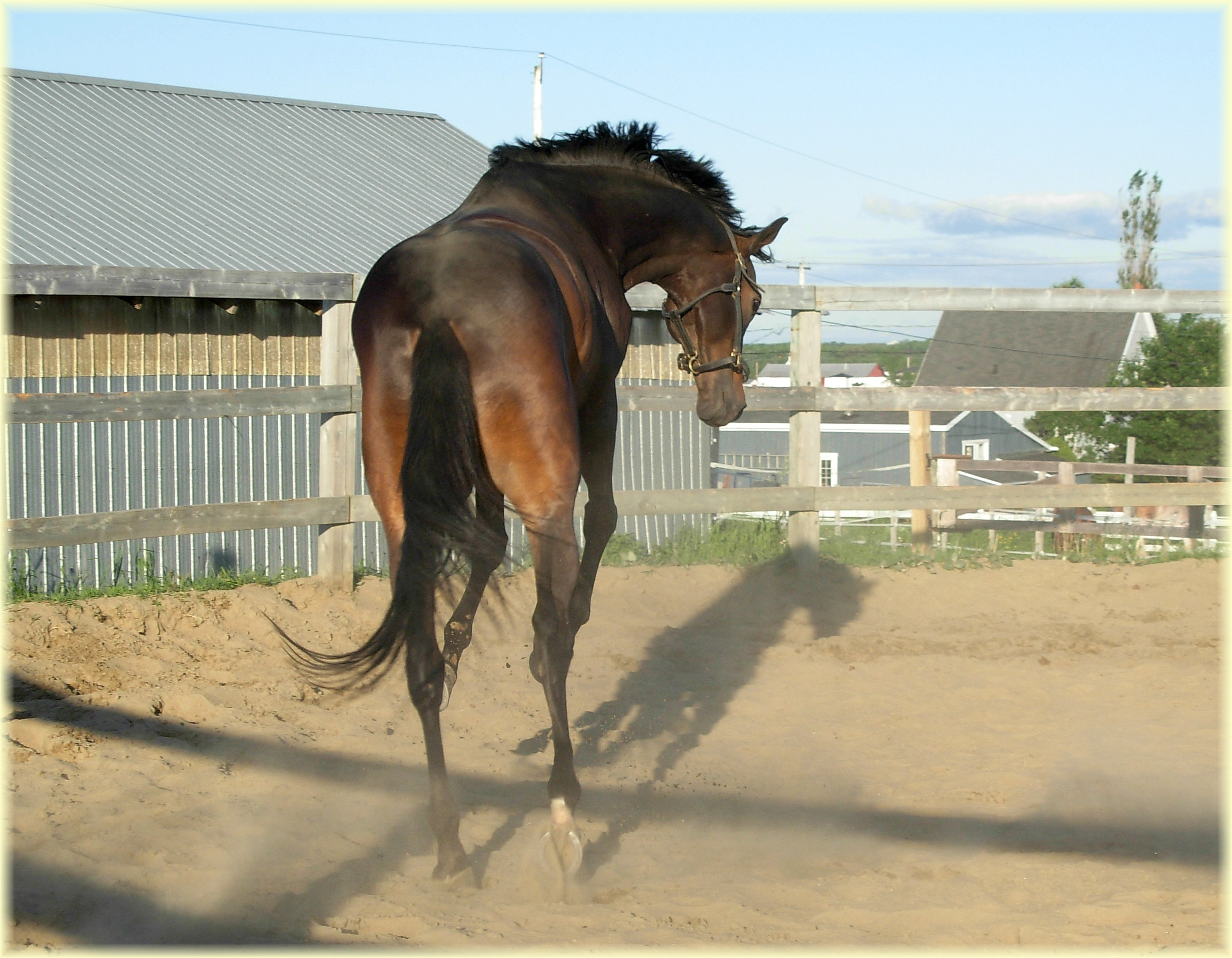
Bucking is a normal behavior for a horse with an overabundance of energy, and in a loose horse, may simply be playful behavior, as here

Bucking, though a potentially dangerous disobedience when under saddle, is a natural aspect of horse behavior. Bucking is used by animals for several reasons. In the wild, it can be used as a defense mechanism against predators such as mountain lions that attack by leaping on the animal’s back. By performing this behaviour, the animal throws a predator from its back. It can also be used as a mechanism of play and territorial herd defense.

For a human to safely ride a horse, the horse has to be desensitized to the presence of something on its back and also learn not to kick out with both hind legs while under saddle. Nonetheless, because the instinct is always there, bucking can still occur for a number of reasons:

- Happiness, such as when a horse bucks during a gallop because of enjoyment, or during play.
- General excitement, such as horses that buck in a crowded schooling ring or at the beginning of a ride in a crowd of horses, such as an endurance ride.
- The rider's aids while riding or training cause confusion, frustration, or fear in the horse, and the horse responds by bucking.
- The horse is "fresh", having been kept up in a stall for a long period of time, and is releasing pent-up energy.
- Pain or discomfort which may be due to an ill-fitting saddle or another piece of equipment, tooth problems, or other medical issues.
- Provocation, usually due to an insect bite (usually on the hindquarters) which the horse is trying to rid itself of, or in some cases a response to use of a whip on the flank or hindquarters.
- Untrained horses may instinctually buck the first few times they have a saddle on the back if not given proper ground training, and occasionally, even with proper preparation. This is an instinctive defense mechanism.
- Disobedience to the riding aids, when a horse does not wish to do what is asked by the rider. Sometimes this is due to poor riding on the part of the person, but sometimes a horse attempts to evade a legitimate request by bucking.
- Rodeo broncs and bucking bulls are used specifically as bucking stock, usually bred to be prone to bucking and encouraged to buck whenever a rider is on their back with the help of a "bucking strap" around their flank.
- Fear of loud and noisy machines, like cars, trucks, trains, and planes. In response to injuries that have resulted, the American courts have uniformly held that "the needs of a modern, industrial society often conflict with and generally must prevail over the delicate sensibilities of horses."

Ordinary riders need to learn to ride out and correct a simple buck or two, because it is a relatively common form of disobedience. Further, at times, movement akin to bucking is actually required of a horse: Horses that are jumping over an obstacle actually are using almost the same action as bucking when launching themselves into the air, it is simply carried out with advanced planning over a higher and wider distance. The classical dressage movement known as the Capriole is also very similar to the low buck done by a horse when it kicks out with both hind legs.

== Solutions to bucking ==
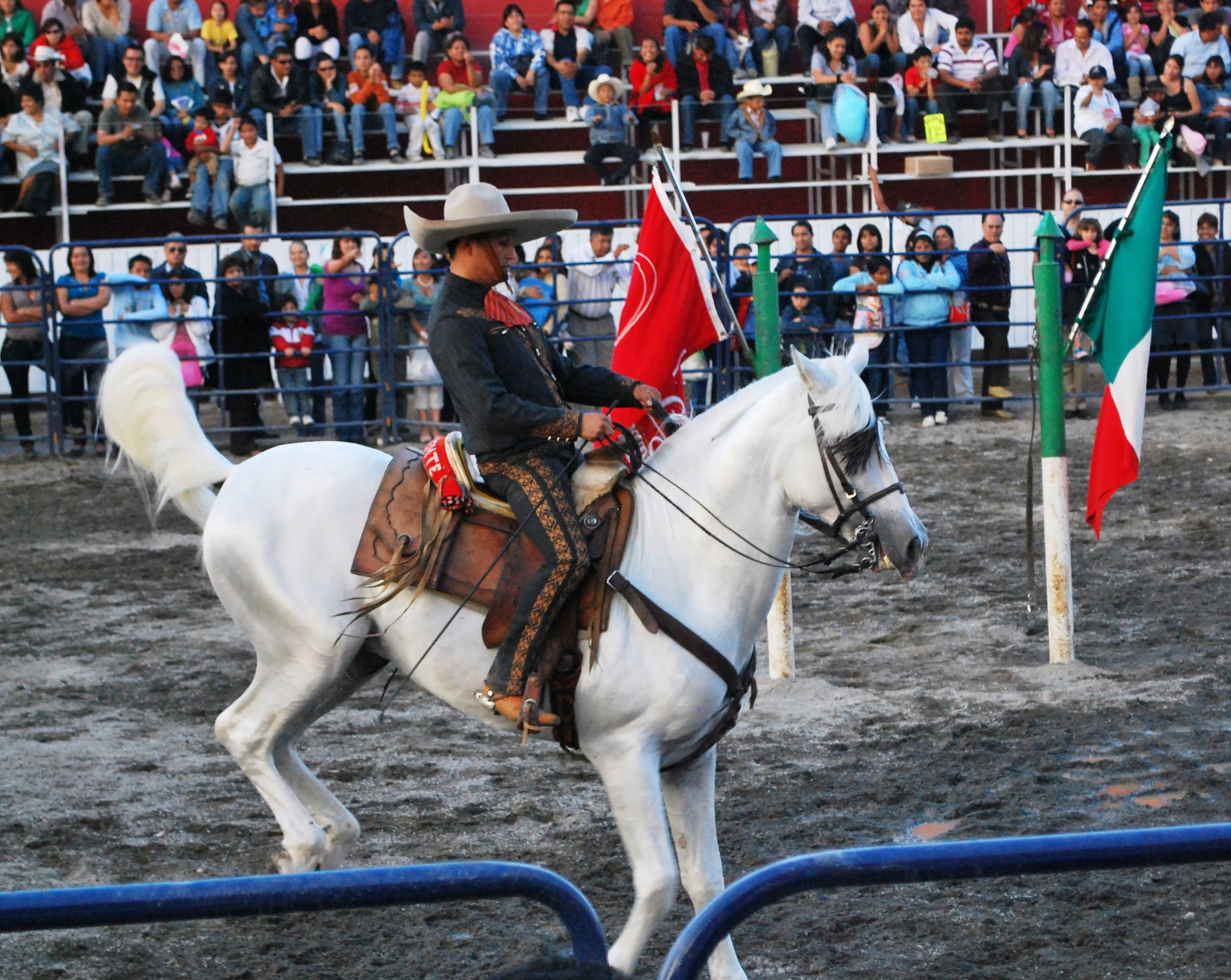
Horse bucking as an act of disobedience or discomfort

Bucking in horses, especially if triggered by fear, pain or excitement, is generally a minor disobedience, unless it is strong enough to unseat the rider, at which point it is a dangerous act. If bucking is a premeditated act of the horse and becomes an undesired habit (such as when a horse learns to buck off a rider so as to no longer have to work), then the horse must be re-schooled by a professional trainer.

It is important to address the problem of the bucking immediately. Even with good cause, it is a potentially dangerous disobedience that cannot be encouraged or allowed to continue. However, a rider does need to be sure that it is not triggered by pain or poor riding. The horse's turn-out schedule should also be assessed, as extra turn-out will give a horse to release extra energy before a rider gets on. In certain cases (such as a show, when horses are unable to be turned-out for extended periods), longeing the horses for a brief period can help calm excess energy, allowing the rider to mount, and ride safely.

If poor riding is the cause, special attention and improvement to the rider’s balance and aids will help eliminate confusion and thus prevent the behavior. If ill-fitting equipment is the problem, a refit of the tack causing the discomfort is necessary to not only stop the bucking, but also to prevent further injuries that may arise due to poor fit.

Usually a horse gives some warning that it is about to buck by dropping its head, slowing down or stopping, and excessively rounding up its back. With such an advance warning, riders can intervene in early stages by encouraging forward motion or circling. With less warning, a rider may still prevent bucking by using one direct rein to pull the horse's head sideways and up, turning the horse in a small circle. This is sometimes called a “one-rein stop.” If a rider pulls the horse's head up with both reins, the horse's neck is stronger and the rider is likely to be flipped over the horse's head. By turning the horse sideways, the rider has more leverage and a horse cannot easily buck while turning around. This also can be used to stop a horse that has begun bucking. When the horse stops bucking, it must be asked to move forward—forward motion makes it difficult for the horse to buck and discourages the behavior. The use of positive punishment, such as to deliberately put the horse into a hollowed-out frame for a moment by deliberately raising the head and hollowing out the horse's back, may discourage or reduce the power and severity of the buck. Raising the head or the application of upward and sideways pressure on the horses head to create discomfort immediately following a buck has been shown to discourage bucking in the future. Certain training aids, such as a gag bit, certain types of martingale or, particularly on ponies, an overcheck, may also discourage bucking.

Bucking is sometimes seen during the early stages of horse training, often caused by the uncomfortable new feeling of a piece of saddlery, which will usually reside after habituation. If the behavior stems from the frustration that arises with inconsistent or absent reinforcement or punishment, then special attention from the handler, such as a consistent reinforcement schedule could be implemented.

== Consequences of chronic bucking ==
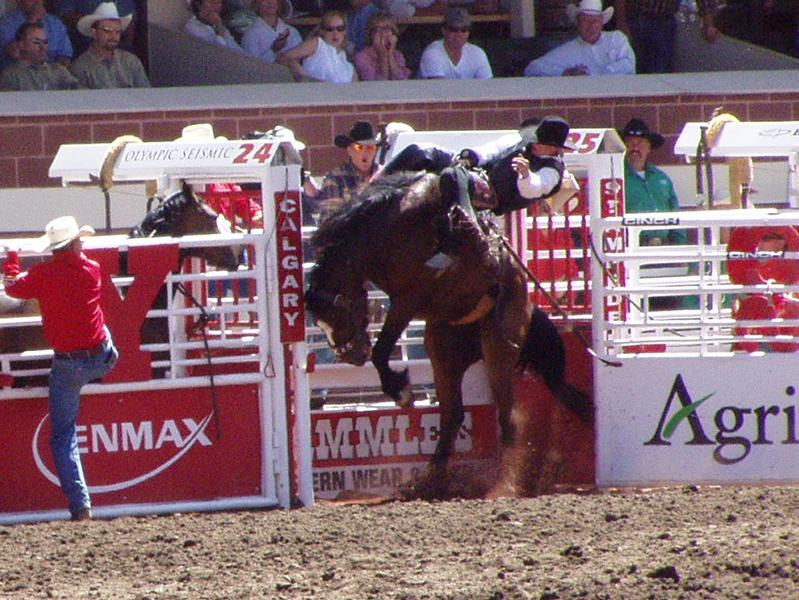
Some horses are chosen for use in rodeos, due to their habitual or powerful bucking ability.

Horses that are chronic and consistent buckers cannot be ridden safely and if they cannot be retrained become unsuitable for any type of ordinary riding. There are few options available to such an animal, and thus may become unwanted by many buyers. Thus, humane euthanasia or sale to slaughter may be that animal's fate.

In a few cases, a horse that cannot be retrained not to buck may be sold to a rodeo stock contractor. Ironically, such horses often fetch a high price in the bucking stock world because they often are easy to handle on the ground, yet very clever and skilled at unseating riders, thus allowing a cowboy to obtain a high score if the rider can stay on. At rodeo auctions such as the Miles City Bucking Horse Sale, a spoiled riding horse, particularly one that is powerfully built, will bring a top price and have a long career in rodeo.

== See also ==
- Bronc riding
- Bull riding
- Bucking horse
- Bucking bull
