= Bucking horse =

Untrained horse or a horse that habitually bucks

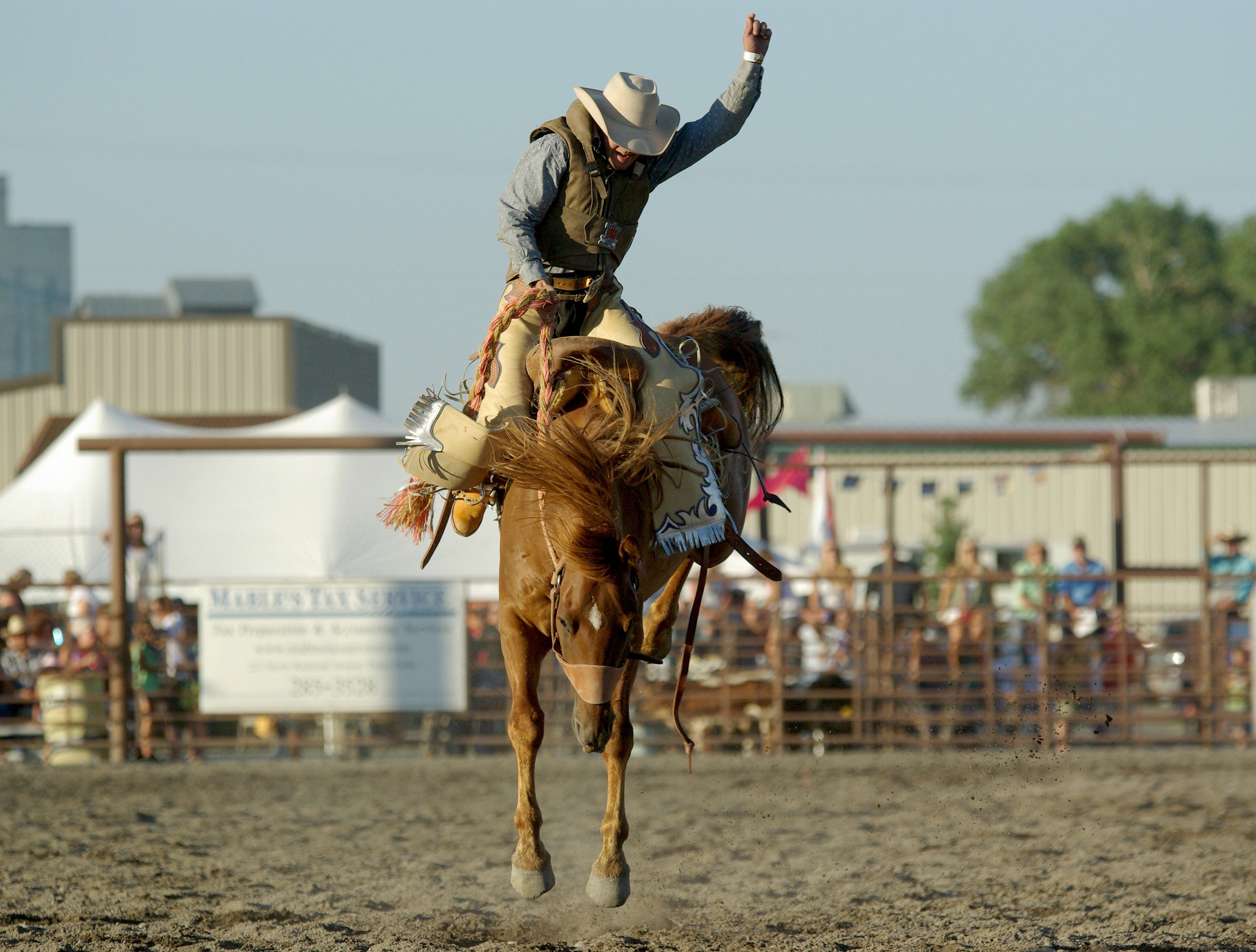
Cowboy riding a saddlebronc

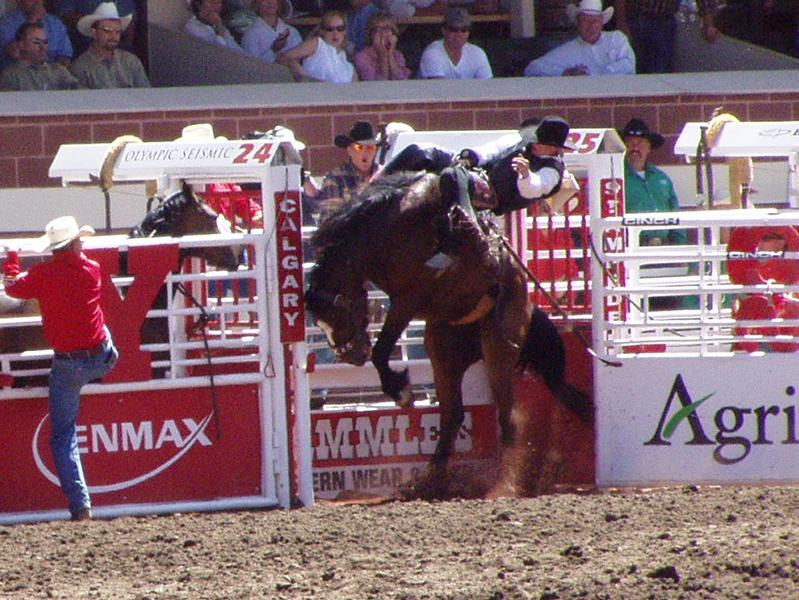
Bareback bronc at a rodeo

A bucking horse is any breed of horse, male or female, with a propensity to buck. They have been, and still are, referred to by various names, including bronco, broncho, and roughstock.

The harder they buck, the more desirable they are for rodeo events. Roughstock breeders have long established strings of bucking horses with broodmares and stallions that have been bred and crossbred to more consistently produce the desired temperaments and athletic ability needed for bareback and saddle bronc riding competition. Bareback broncs are typically smaller and faster athletes, whereas saddle broncs are heavier bodied athletes of great strength and endurance.

== History ==
=== Etymology ===
The term comes from the Spanish language word bronco meaning "rough" (adj), or "gruff" (n), which in Mexican usage also describes the horse. It was borrowed and adapted in U.S. cowboy jargon. It has also been spelled "broncho", though this form is virtually unknown in the western United States, where the word is most common. In modern English, the "o" is commonly dropped, particularly in the American West, and the animal is simply called a "bronc". Many other instances of cowboy jargon were similarly borrowed from Mexican cowboys, including words such as lariat, chaps, and "buckaroo", which are in turn corruptions of the Spanish "la reata", "chaparreras", and "vaquero".

The exact term also refers to the bucking horses used in rodeo "roughstock" events, such as bareback bronc riding and saddle bronc riding. Some dictionaries define bronco as untrained range horses that roam freely in western North America, and may associate them with Mustangs; but they are not necessarily feral or wild horses. The only true wild horses are the Tarpan and Przewalski’s horse.

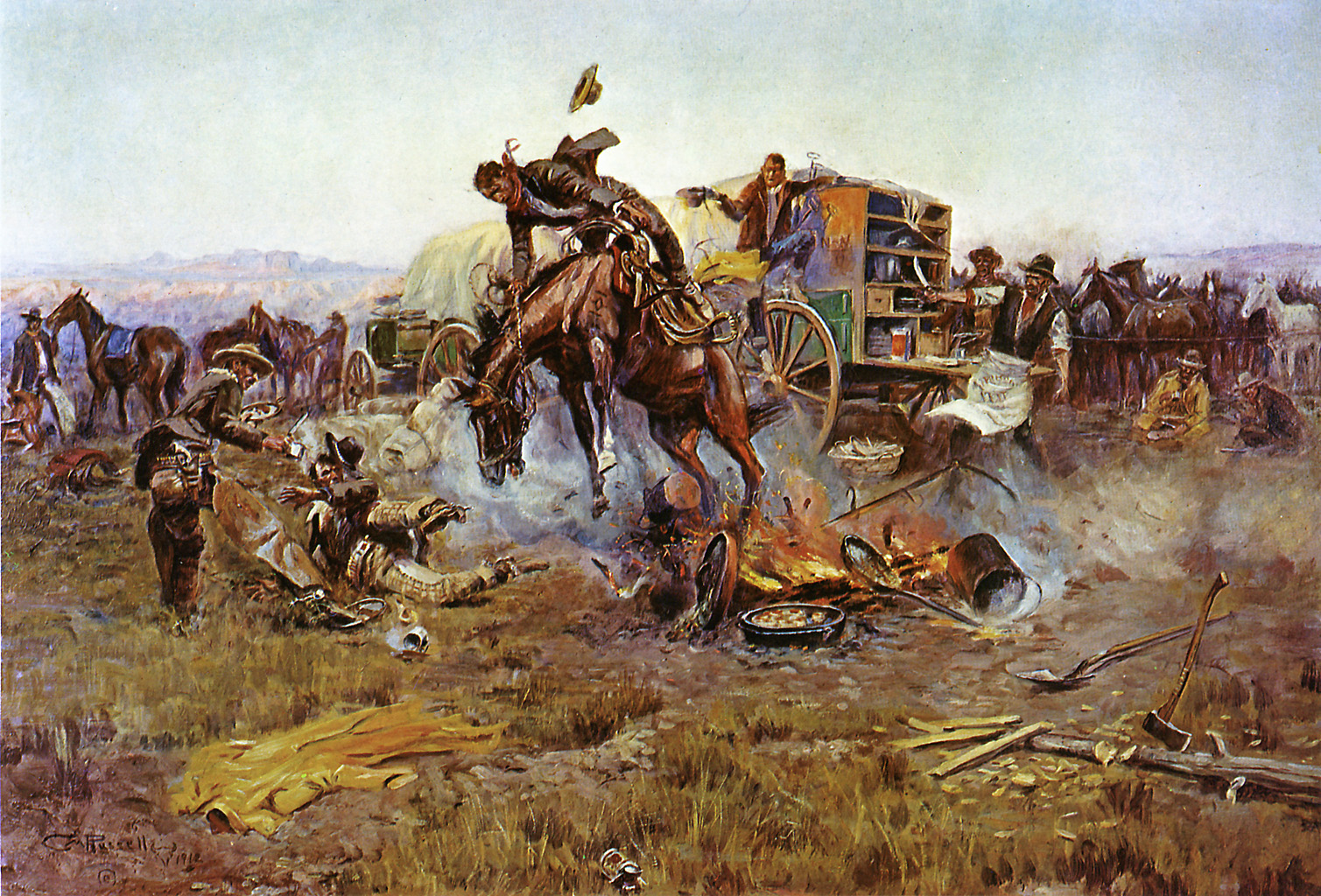
Camp Cook's Troubles, a depiction of a western bronc or bronco, by C. M. Russell

=== Modern usage ===
In modern usage, the word "bronco" is seldom used for a "wild" or feral horse, because the modern rodeo bucking horse is a domestic animal. Some are specifically bred for bucking ability and raised for the rodeo, while others are spoiled riding horses who have learned to quickly and effectively throw off riders. Informally, the term is often applied in a joking manner to describe any horse that acts up and bucks with or without a rider. In modern times, contractors who supply bucking horses for bronc riding events are called rough stock contractors.

The silhouette of a cowboy on a bucking bronco is the official symbol for the State of Wyoming. In 2016, the Bucking Horse Breeders Association (BHBA) was founded to serve as a bucking horse DNA registry for the purpose of documenting and preserving the names and lineages of bucking horses.

== Bucking behavior ==
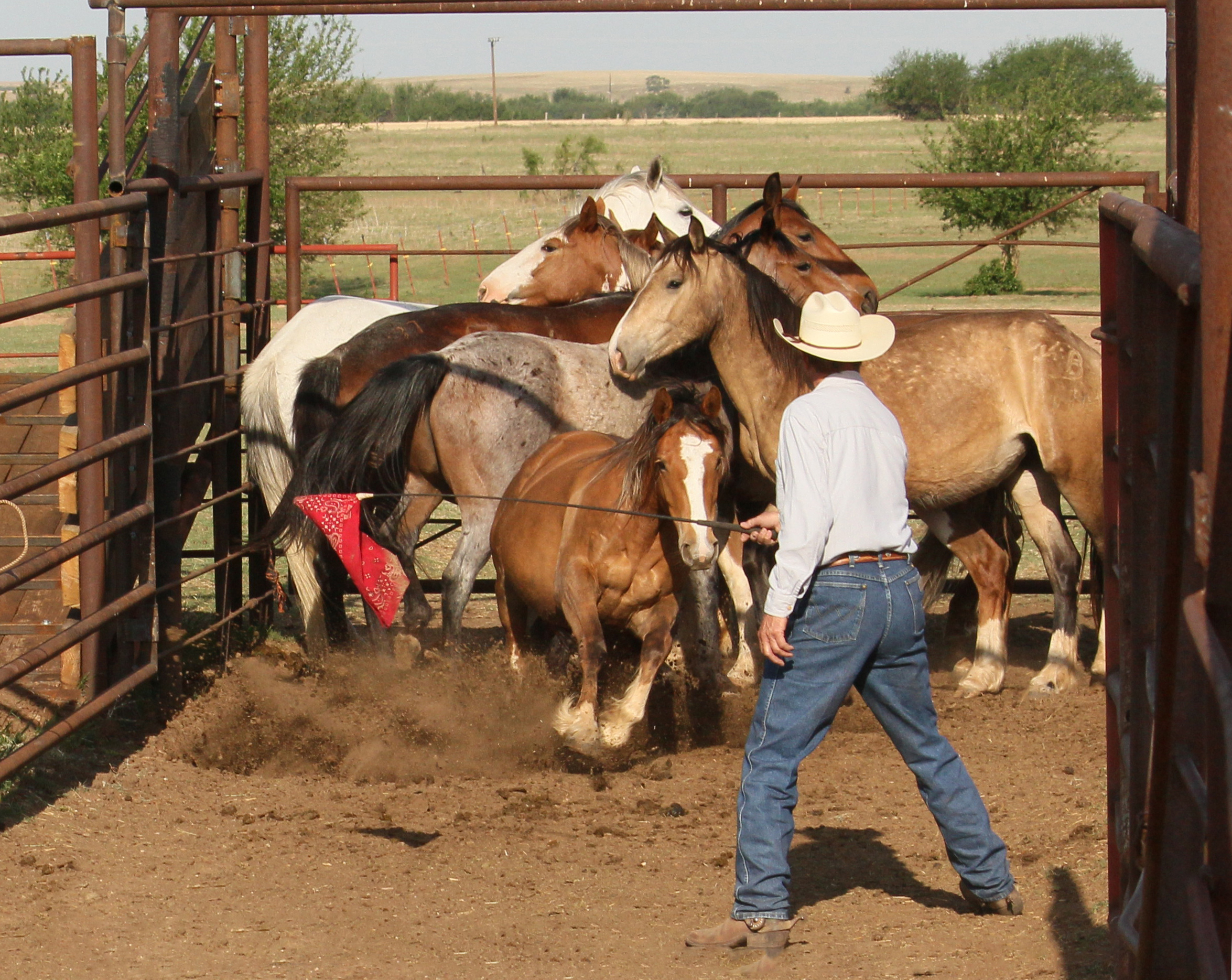
Sorting bucking horses (roughstock)

Bucking is an instinctual characteristic in horses which serves to protect them against predators. It is quite natural for new foals and young horses to frolic and buck playfully. When Cowboys run spurs on their sides they buck. Cowboys have a unique appreciation and respect for horses that can buck – it is a desirable trait in rodeo roughstock; however, outside the rodeo arena, bucking is an undesirable trait and considered bad behavior. Bucking has caused some people to fear horses, much of which results from a lack of familiarity with and knowledge about horses, including the necessary horsemanship skills to help them better understand the true nature of horses.

== Bucking Horse Breeders Association ==
In 2016, Steve Stone co-founded the BHBA, a private company located in Vernal, Utah. He saw a need for a DNA registry for bucking horses, something similar to what the Professional Bull Riders (PBR), American Bucking Bull, and stock contractors had created for bucking bulls. He started tracing bloodlines of top bucking horses provided by rodeo producer Sankey Pro Rodeo, and stock contractor Tooke Bucking Horses. While researching, he noticed the recurrence of Sankey's foundation bucking horse sire, "Custer", who died in 1994. Custer was a better sire of bucking horses than he was a bucking horse, and had sired strong quality athletes with longevity. Stone also discovered that some 30 head of the bucking horses used for the 1996 National Finals Rodeo (NFR) were descendants of Custer, and at least 15 were provided by Sankey. Custer was thought to be sired by Gray Wolf, one of the stallions in the Tooke's bucking horse string. After the BHBA was founded, the remains of Custer and Gray Wolf were exhumed in order to register their DNA. It was then discovered that Gray Wolf was not the sire of Custer, rather it was Timberline, another stallion in the Tooke's string.

== See also ==
- Pickup rider
- Bucking bull
