= Steer riding =

Rodeo event

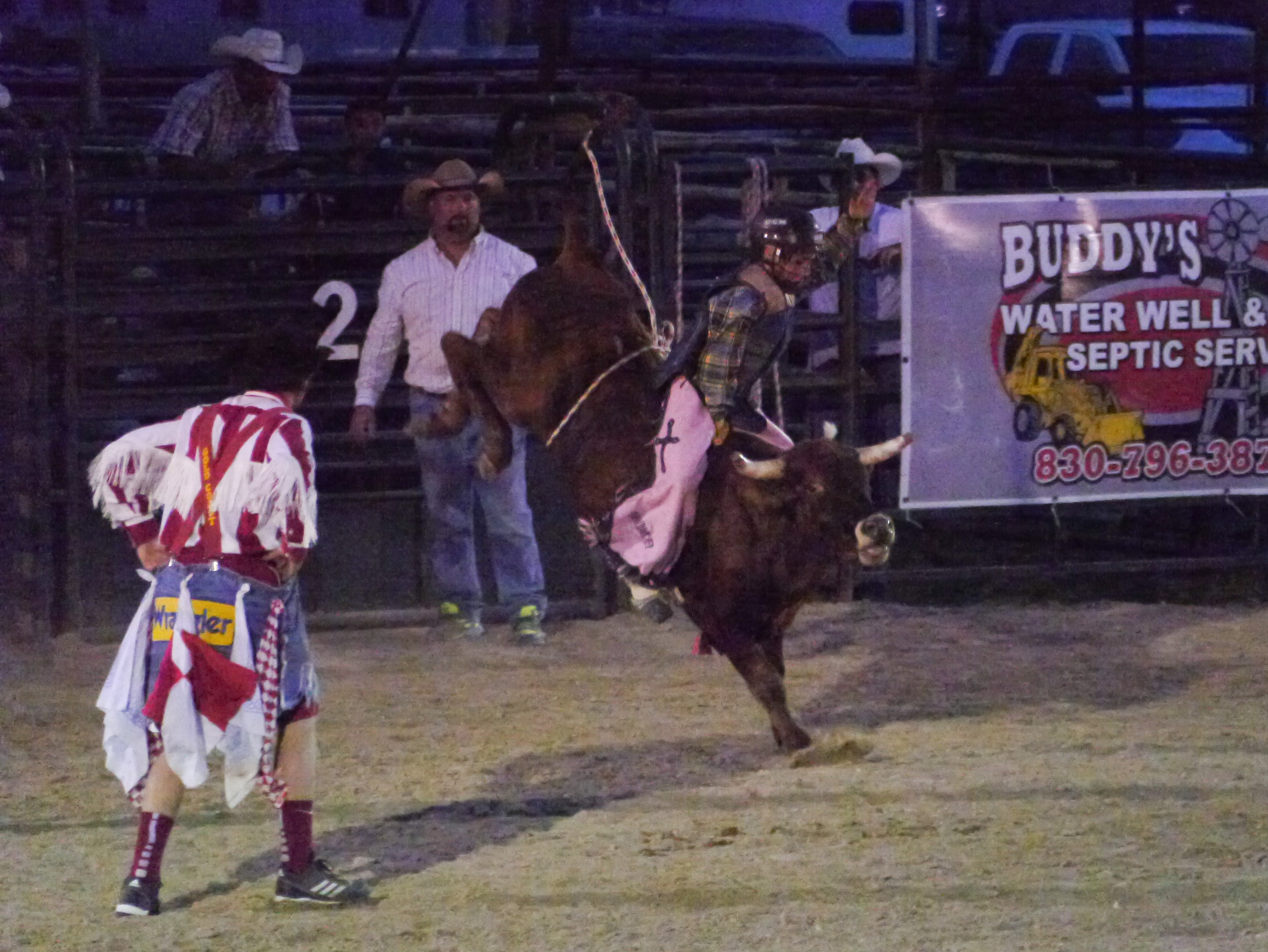
The steer is trying to buck off the mounted individual

Steer riding is a rodeo youth event that is an introductory form of bull riding for younger riders, usually between the ages of seven and fourteen. Instead of bucking bulls, the children ride steers that buck. Steers are used because they are known to have a less volatile temperament than bulls (steers are castrated while bulls are intact) and many breeds weigh less than bulls, which makes them a perfect stepping stone to junior bulls. The steers usually weigh between 500 and 1,000 pounds (230 and 450 kg). Steer riding usually follows mutton busting and calf riding as the participant ages and grows. Many young and aspiring bull riders who train in steer riding compete in the National Junior Bullriders Association.

The National Junior Bullriders Association holds these annual contests:

- 6 & Under Mutton Busting
- 8 & Under Calf Riding
- 11 & Under Steer Riding
- 13 & Under Peewee Bullriding
- 15 & Under Jr. Bullriding
- 19 & Under Sr. Bullriding

Riders use equipment and riding techniques that are similar to adult bull riding. The steers are equipped with the following: a flank strap – the flank strap is placed around a steer's flank, just in front of the hind legs, to encourage bucking. And then they also use a "steer rope" – a rope that goes around the steer for the rider to hang onto with a bell underneath. The riders wear batwing chaps, and spurs. For safety, they use protective vests and helmets with a face mask that resemble those worn by hockey goalies.

Events are usually broken down by age brackets. Parental permission is required for their children to compete, and they must sign a liability waiver. It is possible for competitors to be seriously injured in the event.

Like bull riding, riders must stay on for eight seconds for a qualified ride. Half of the score is awarded for the cowboy's ability to ride, and the other half for the steer's ability to buck. One difference is that in some steer riding competitions, riders are allowed to hang on with both hands. They can choose to compete riding one-handed, like the adults, but if they do, they fall under the same rules as bull riding and can be disqualified for grabbing the steer with both hands. Riders can also be disqualified for touching the animal or themselves during the ride. Failure to stay on for the full 8 seconds or a disqualification results in a no score.

Riding steers allows riders to develop needed skills before taking on bulls. As bulls are being bred to be more athletic and dangerous, it is more important than ever for adolescent, teenagers, and young adults to get all of the experience they need before taking on bulls. One man, a former PRCA World Champion Bull Rider, Cody Custer, discusses this issue at length on his web site. When youngsters take on "junior bulls" that only a decade or two ago were considered pro level bulls, they have an extremely low success rate and get discouraged or injured beyond what is reasonably acceptable.

There are also some steers not used in rodeo who have been trained not to buck and instead are gentled to be ridden. Most people who have trained their cattle to be ridden have used them to perform similar tasks which horses perform, such as trail riding, jumping, and running. However, they do require different maintenance and handling than horses. Some breeds of cattle are more conducive than others.

== See also ==
- Mutton busting
- Miniature bull riding
- Goat tying
