= Pickup rider =

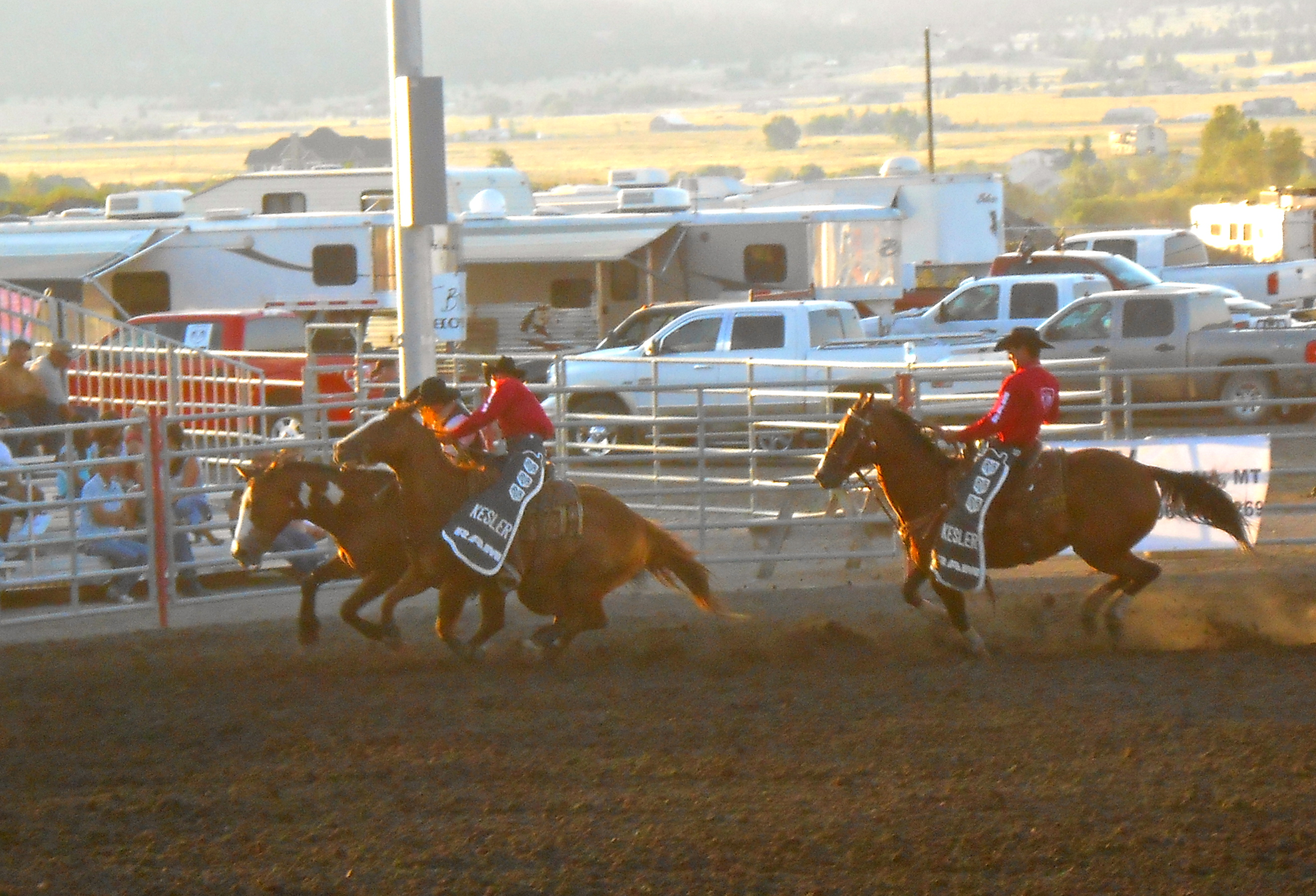
Pickup riders assisting a cowboy after his successful ride concludes

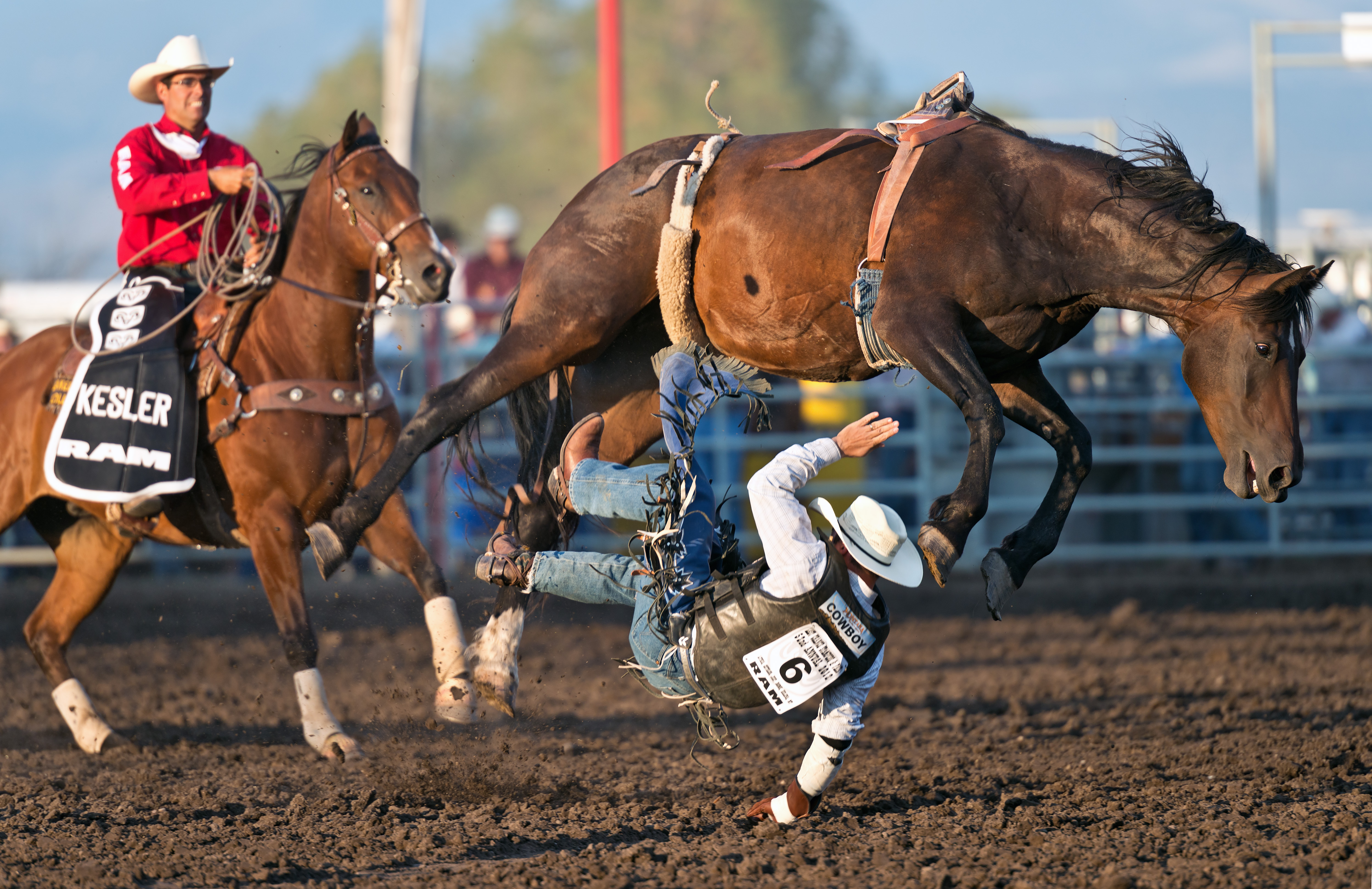
A pickup rider (at left) waiting to assist a falling bronc rider

A pickup rider is a person on horseback who works at a rodeo in the rough stock competitions of bareback riding, saddle bronc riding, and bull riding. Pickup riders play an important role in assisting rodeo riders and increasing the safety of competitors.

Pickup riders usually work in teams of two. Their most important job is to help the competitor at the end of his/her ride by riding next to the bucking horse, allowing the competitor to dismount safely, usually by grabbing the pickup rider or the pickup rider providing stability while the competitor jumps or swings free. If a competitor becomes tangled or caught up in the equipment, a pickup rider may assist the competitor in getting free. If a competitor falls off, the pickup rider may help herd the animal away from the fallen rider.

The general pattern is for one pickup rider to take charge of helping the competitor while the other stays near the horse to remove the flank strap from the bucking animal and herd it out of the arena. If necessary, pickup riders can rope the animal and lead it out if the animal is reluctant to leave the arena.

In the case of bull riding, the competitors are primarily assisted by the bullfighters who helps protect the rider from the bull. Once the competitor has gotten off the bull, voluntarily or otherwise, the pickup riders may haze the bull from the arena, lassoing it if needed, working with the bullfighters to keep the animal from hurting people on the ground.

== See also ==
- Stock contractor
