= Spectra Shield =

Composite material used in bulletproof vests and vehicle armour

Spectra Shield is a composite material (specifically, an ultra-high-molecular-weight polyethylene (UHMWPE) fiber) used in bulletproof vests and vehicle armour. It is manufactured by Honeywell. Spectra is a fiber offered by Honeywell, and "Shield" is their patented process for using resin and a "plastic film" to bind multiple overlapping layers of Spectra, without having to have them be woven together.

Other popular fibers with similar uses are aramid (Kevlar or Twaron) and Dyneema (another UHMWPE).
