= Bronc riding =

Rodeo event that involves riding a bucking horse

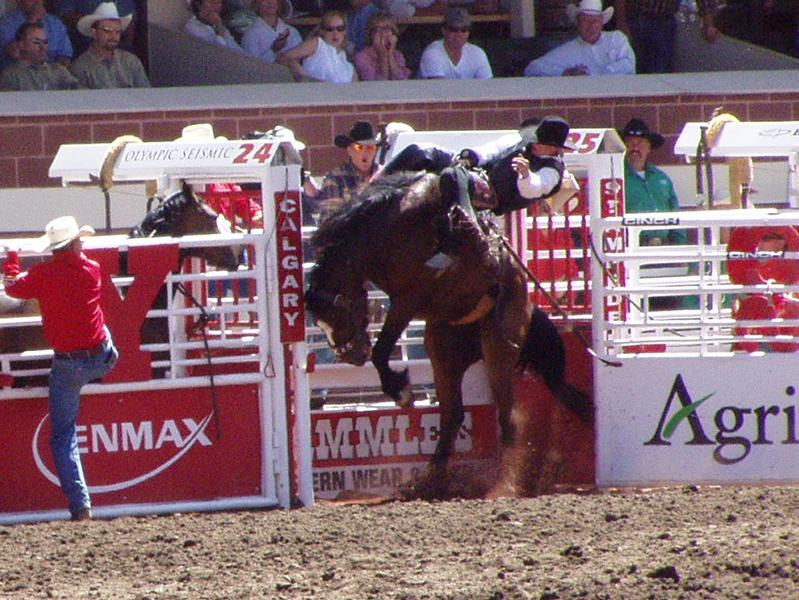
Bareback bronc riding at the Calgary Stampede

Bronc riding, either bareback bronc or saddle bronc competition, is a rodeo event that involves a rodeo participant riding a bucking horse (sometimes called a bronc or bronco) that attempts to throw or buck off the rider. Originally based on the necessary buck breaking skills of a working cowboy, the event is now a highly stylized competition that utilizes horses that often are specially bred for strength, agility, and bucking ability. It is recognized by most rodeo organizations such as the Professional Rodeo Cowboys Association (PRCA) and the International Professional Rodeo Association (IPRA).

== Description ==
Each competitor climbs onto a horse, which is held in a small pipe or wooden enclosure called a bucking chute. When the rider is ready, the gate of the bucking chute is opened and the horse bursts out and begins to buck. The rider attempts to stay on the horse for eight seconds without touching the horse with their free hand. On the first jump out of the chute, the rider must "mark the horse out". This means they must have the heels of their boots in contact with the horse above the point of the shoulders before the horse's front legs hit the ground. A rider that manages to complete a ride is scored on a scale of 0–50 and the horse is also scored on a scale of 0–50. The ride as a whole is rated as the sum of these individual scores: scores in the 80s are considered very good, and in the 90s are considered exceptional. A horse who bucks in a spectacular and effective manner will score more points than a horse who bucks in a straight line with no significant changes of direction.

== History ==
The earliest examples of American bronc riding were believed to have been born out of breaking horses for the United States Army, most notably in Wyoming and Colorado. The first three sanctioned bronc riding championship events were held in 1901 at the Colorado Cattle and Horse Grower's Association, Denver Horse Show Association, and the Northwestern Colorado competition. The following year competitions were held on September 2, 1902, at Cheyenne, Wyoming's Cheyenne Frontier Days, and in Denver, Colorado, at The Denver Horse Show Association annual event. Both of these were won by Harry Henry Brennan, known today as the "father of modern bronc riding."

Bronc riding originated from everyday ranching, when cowboys had to break and train horses to ride while ranching. They would often have competitions to see who could ride these untrained horses, which eventually led to the formal event called Bronc Riding. In the early 20th century, event slanted in the Cheyenne Daily Leader helped accept bronc riding as an official event. Overtime, bronc riding has evolved into a huge event that has formal rules and judging.

== Rules and scoring ==
In rodeos, bronc riding is a heavily judged event. The rider and horse are both judged on how well they performed. This event requires the rider to stay fully mounted for a full eight seconds while staying in control using only one hand. They must begin by marking out of chute meaning both feet have to be over the horse's shoulders and match the horses movements throughout the ride. If the rider touches the horse with his free hand or losing control can be a result of a 0/disqualification.

Scoring is divided between both the horse and rider. The rider is evaluated based on technique, control, balance, and power. This consists of how in sync the rider is moving with the horse and the constant spurring motion. The horse is judged on bucking performance, speed, and strength. If the horse is super powerful and more unexpected movements it usually gets a higher score.

The final score is combined with both the rider and horses performance. The judges assign points separately and then combine them at the end to determine the final score. This system takes both the good and bad of the horse and rider to combine it into one final score.

== Bareback bronc vs. saddle bronc riding ==
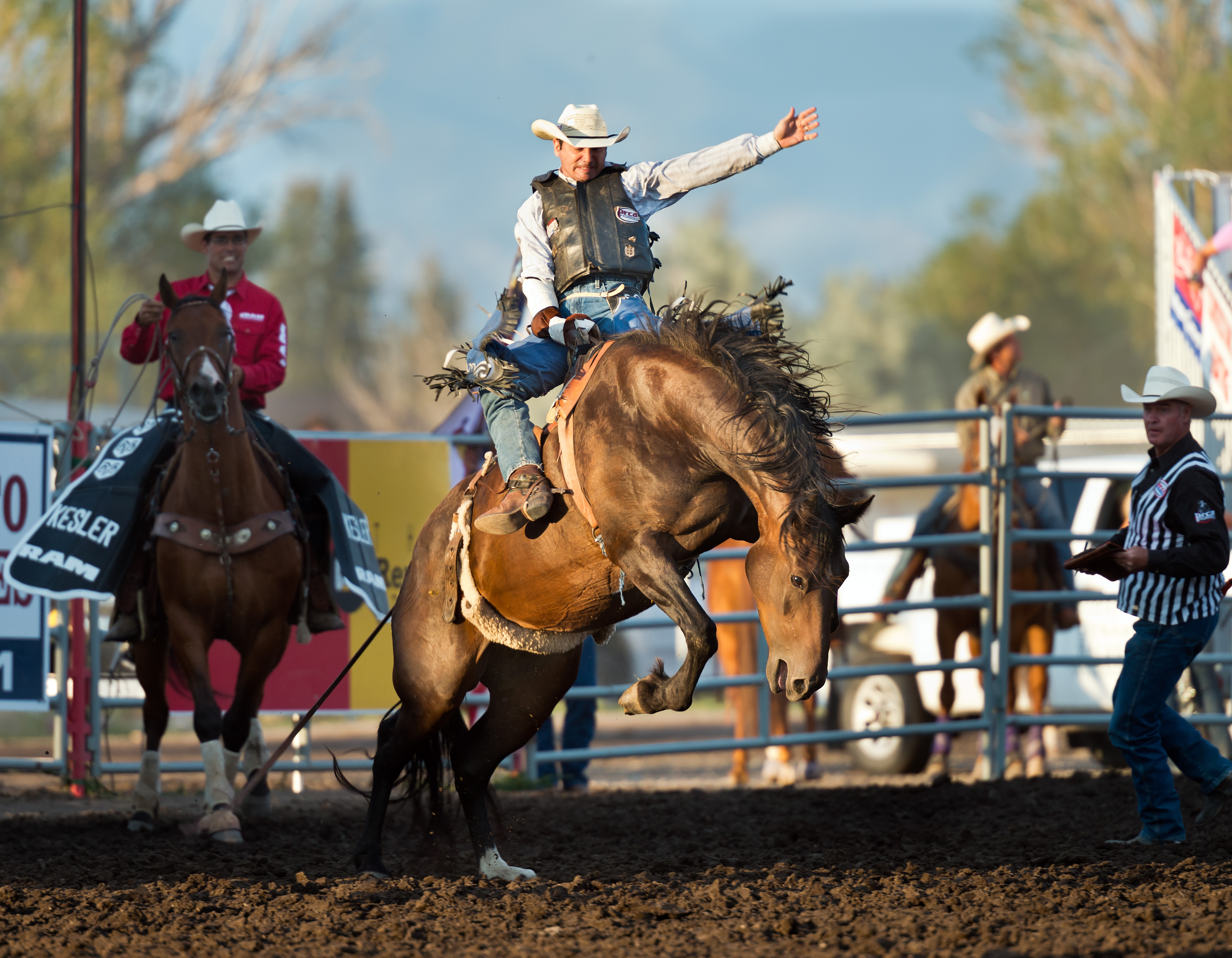
Bareback bronc riding

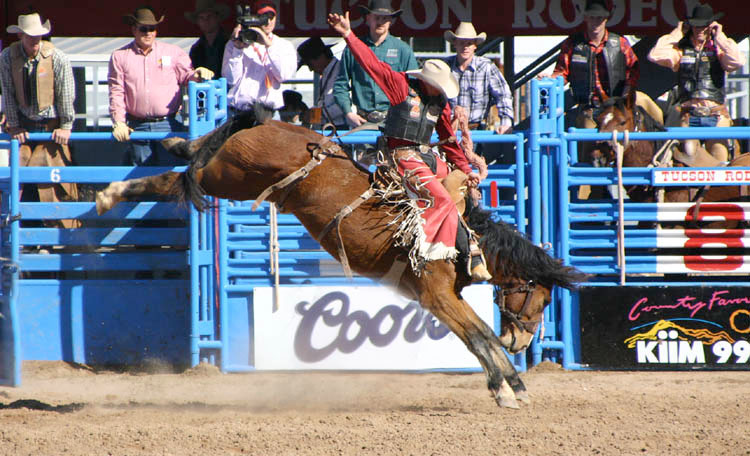
Saddle bronc riding

Bareback bronc and saddle bronc styles are very different. In saddle bronc, the rider uses a specialized saddle with free-swinging stirrups and no horn. The saddle bronc rider grips a simple rein braided from cotton or polyester and attached to a leather halter worn by the horse. The rider lifts on the rein and attempts to find a rhythm with the animal by spurring forwards and backwards with their feet in a sweeping motion from shoulder to flank.

The bareback rider does not use a saddle or rein, but uses a rigging that consists of a leather and rawhide composite piece often compared to a suitcase handle attached to a surcingle and placed just behind the horse's withers. The rider leans back and spurs with an up and down motion from the horse's point of shoulder toward the rigging handle, spurring at each jump in rhythm with the motion of the horse.

In both events, after the completion of successful rides, two pickup riders in the arena attempt to help the contestants safely dismount the still-moving horses.

Bareback bronc riding began to develop as a professional rodeo sporting event around 1900. The riding equipment used during that era varied. In some cases, the rider simply held onto the horse's mane, called a mane-hold. Others held a loose or twisted rope tied around the horse's girth, and other methods involved using multiple handhold leather riggings based on a surcingle. In the early 1920s, when the old rodeo rules allowing two handed riding were being phased out and replaced with the newer rule of riding with one hand in the rigging and one hand in the air, Earl Bascom invented, designed and made rodeo's first one-hand bareback rigging. The original one-handed rigging was made by Bascom from a section of rubber belting discarded from a threshing machine, with the entire rigging—the handhold and the body—all made as one piece. The handhold was folded back and riveted to the main body of the rigging, with a 'D' ring riveted on each side for tying the latigos. This rigging was first used at the Raymond Stampede in Alberta, Canada, in July 1924. Bascom then refined the design, making his second one-handhold rigging out of leather and rawhide. Sole leather was used for the rigging body. Strips of leather, with rawhide sewed between, were used for the handhold with sheepskin glued under the handholds to protect the knuckles; this arrangement became known as "Bascom's Rigging". Honored in several Halls of Fame, Bascom is now known as the "Father of the Modern-day Bareback Rigging". Variations of Bascom's rigging are still used in rodeos today.

Both bareback and saddle bronc riding are practiced in rodeos of the United States, Canada, Mexico, Brazil, Australia, and New Zealand. Brazil also has its own unique style of bronc riding called cutiano, which is a hybrid of bareback and saddle bronc riding.

== The horse ==
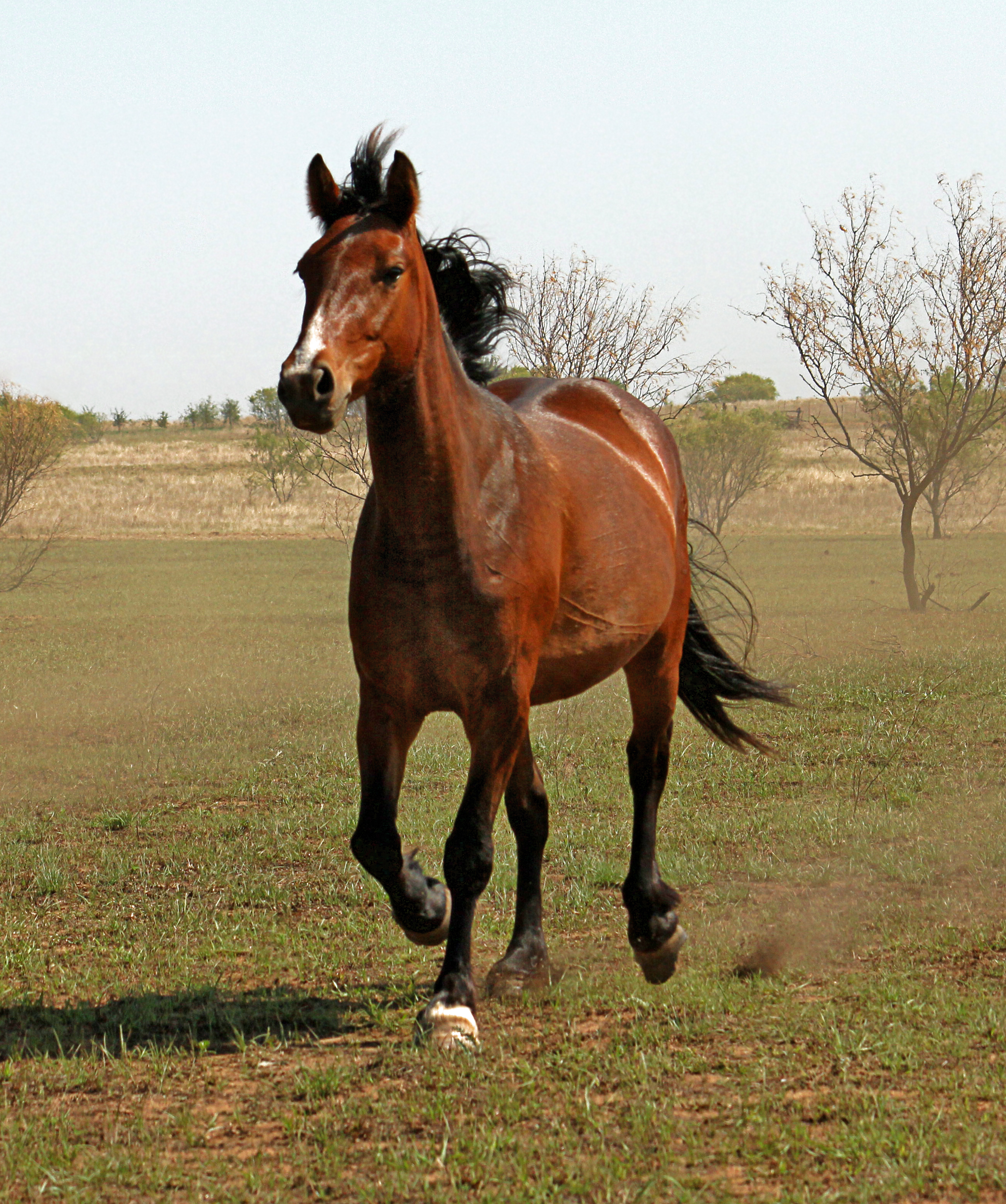
A bucking horse at pasture during the off season

The bucking horse is usually a mare, but occasionally, a gelding (a castrated male horse) is used. Bucking horses usually travel in close quarters and are housed in a herd setting. Geldings are generally less disruptive and more prone to get along with one another. Mares are also used, and while a mixed herd of mares and geldings is a bit more prone to disruptions, they can be kept together without great difficulties. Stallions are less common, because they can be disruptive in a herd and may fight if there are mares present.

The modern bronc is not a truly feral horse. Most bucking stock are specifically bred for use in rodeos, with horses having exceptional bucking ability being purchased by stock contractors and fetching a high price. Most are allowed to grow up in a natural, semi-wild condition on the open range, but also have to be gentled and tamed in order to be managed from the ground, safely loaded into trailers, vaccinated and wormed, and to load in and out of bucking chutes. They also are initially introduced to bucking work with cloth dummies attached to the saddle. Due to the rigors of travel and the short bursts of high intensity work required, most horses in a bucking string are at least six or seven years old.

== Animal welfare issues ==
The event has provoked concerns among some animal welfare advocates that practices used in the event may constitute animal cruelty.

Modern rodeos in the United States are closely regulated and have responded to accusations of animal cruelty by instituting a number of rules to guide how rodeo livestock are to be managed. The PRCA has rules that specifically regulate the proper care and treatment of rodeo animals; these guidelines must be followed by all rodeo participants in sanctioned rodeos. In 1994, a survey of 28 sanctioned rodeos was conducted by on-site independent veterinarians. Reviewing 33,991 animal runs, the injury rate was documented at 16 animals or 0.047 percent, less than five hundredths of one percent or one in 2000 animals. A study of rodeo animals in Australia found a similar injury rate. Basic injuries occurred at a rate of 0.072 percent, or one in 1,405, with injuries requiring veterinary attention at 0.036 percent, or one injury in every 2810 times the animal was used, and transport, yarding and competition were all included in the study. A later PRCA survey of 60,971 animal performances at 198 rodeo performances and 73 sections of "slack" indicated 27 animals were injured, again approximately five-hundredths of 1 percent – 0.0004. However, accusations of cruelty in the USA persist. The PRCA acknowledges that they only sanction about 30 percent of all rodeos, while another 50 percent are sanctioned by other organizations and 20 percent are completely unsanctioned. Several animal rights organizations keep records of accidents and incidents of possible animal abuse. They cite various specific incidents of injury to support their statements, and also point to examples of long-term breakdown, as well as reporting on injuries and deaths suffered by animals in non-rodeo events staged on the periphery of professional rodeo such as chuckwagon races and "suicide runs". While in terms of actual statistics on animal injury rate, there appear to be no more recent independent studies on animal injury in rodeo than the 1994 study, groups such as PETA gather anecdotal reports such as one from a 2010 rodeo in Colorado alleging eleven animal injuries, of which two were fatal.

There are economic incentives to keep animals healthy enough for continuing rodeo participation. Bucking horses and bulls are costly to replace: a proven bucking horse can be sold for $8000 to $10,000, making "rough stock" an investment worth caring for and keeping in good health for many years. Health regulations also mandate vaccinations and blood testing of horses crossing state lines. An injured animal will not buck well and hence a cowboy cannot obtain a high score for his ride, so sick or injured animals are not run through the chutes, but instead are given appropriate veterinary care so they can be returned to their usual level of strength and power. PRCA regulations require veterinarians to be available at all rodeos to treat both bucking stock and other animals as needed. The PRCA requires a veterinarian be at all sanctioned rodeos.

Activists also express concern that many rodeo horses end their lives as horsemeat. While it is accurate that some rough stock animals are slaughtered for horsemeat at the end of their useful careers, other bucking horses are retired at the end of their rodeo usefulness and allowed to live into old age. The issue of horse slaughter crosses all equestrian disciplines and is not confined solely to the rodeo industry. Any unwanted horse can meet this fate, including race horses, show horses, or even backyard pasture pets.

Over the years, some states imposed regulation upon certain techniques and tools used in rodeos. In 2000, California became the first state to prohibit the use of cattle prods on animals in the chute. The city of Pittsburgh prohibited the use of flank straps as well as prods or shocking devices, wire tie-downs, and sharpened or fixed spurs or rowels at rodeos or rodeo-related events. Some other cities and states have passed similar prohibitions. Under PRCA guidelines, electric prods may not deliver a shock stronger than can be produced from two D batteries. Prods are allowed as long as the situation requires them to protect the people or the animals.

=== Flank straps ===
A "flank strap" (or, "bucking strap") is used to encourage the horse to kick out straighter and higher when it bucks. The flank strap is about 4 inches wide, covered in sheepskin or neoprene and fastens behind the widest part of the abdomen. Flank straps that hurt the horse are not allowed by rodeo rules in the United States.

A horse in pain will become sullen and not buck very well, and harm to the genitalia is anatomically impossible because the stifle joint of the hind leg limits how far back a flank strap can be attached.

People for the Ethical Treatment of Animals (PETA) has stated that burrs and other irritants are at times placed under the flank strap and that improperly used flank straps can cause open wounds and burns if the hair is rubbed off and the skin is chafed raw. However, while the implied argument behind this claim is that pain is what makes the horse buck, in actual practice, irritants or pain generally interfere with a horse's ability to buck in an energetic and athletic fashion.

== Cultural significance ==
Bronc riding plays a huge role in rodeo culture and Western heritage. It has developed from cowboys breaking horses to ride in order to take care of the ranch. Over time, these skilled cowboys have created a huge event in the rodeo world. As rodeo blew up, bronc riding became one of the most recognized events in the rodeo world. Today, bronc riding is still a huge part of the rodeo world and reflects the history of cowboys.

== See also ==
- Rodeo
- Bucking horse
- Bucking bull
- Bull riding
- Pickup rider
- Jineteada gaucha
