= Plug =

Plug, PLUG, plugs, or plugged may refer to:

- Plug, an insertive closure or stopper (plug)
  - Core plug, used to fill the casting holes on engines
  - Butt plug, a sex toy that is inserted into the rectum
  - Earplug for ear protection
  - Plug (sanitation), a stopper for a drainage outlet
- Plug (accounting), an unsupported adjustment to an accounting record
- Plug (fishing), a family of fishing lures
- Plug (horticulture), a planting technique
- Plug (jewellery), a type of jewellery worn in stretched piercings
- Fusible plug, a safety device in steam boilers
- Hair plug, hair that has undergone hair transplantation
- Mating plug, secretion used in the mating of some animal species
- Plug, a step in the manufacturing process for parts made of carbon-fiber-reinforced polymer
- Plug, a type of chewing tobacco made by pressing tobacco with syrup
- Plug, the central element of a Plug and feathers, a tool for splitting stone
- Plug computer, a type of small-form-factor computer
- Portland Linux/Unix Group (PLUG), a group of Linux enthusiasts in Portland, Oregon
- Product plug, or product placement in marketing
- Volcanic plug, a geological landform
- Wall plug, a fastener that allows screws to be fitted into drywall or masonry walls
- Plug (plumbing)
- Plug, a worthless horse

== Electrical ==
- Electrical connector, such as:
  - AC power plugs and sockets, for alternating current (mains electricity)
  - DC connector, for direct current (small equipment)
- A semiconductor plug, typically tungsten, is used to fill a via and connect different wiring levels on wafers
- Plug fuses, used in the United States until 1960

== Media and entertainment ==
- Plug (The Bash Street Kids), a character from The Bash Street Kids comic strip in The Beano
- Plug (comics), a British comic that featured Plug from The Bash Street Kids
- Plug Plug, a Peruvian post-hardcore band
- Plugged!, a 1995 album by Vin Garbutt
- Plugged, a 1995 album by The Bobs
- Plugged, a film satirizing advertising, directed by Tim Russ
- Plugged (novel), a 2011 novel by Eoin Colfer
- Plugged (Starflyer 59 album), a 1996 album by Starflyer 59
- Song plugging, the promotion of songs to induce sales
- Plug (music), also called plugg, a subgenre of trap music
- RTL Plug, a Belgian television channel
- Plug Research, a record label

== People ==
- Ina Plug, South African archaeologist
- Plug, an alias of Luke Vibert (born 1973), British electronic musician

== See also ==
- Plug-in (disambiguation)
- Plug board (disambiguation)
