= Morral =

Morral may refer to:

- Mateu Morral, Catalan anarchist who tried to assassinate Alfonso XIII of Spain
- Morral, Ohio
- A feedbag made of thick cloth
