= Adon (disambiguation) =

Adon (אדון) is the Northwest Semitic for lord, mostly used of deities.

Adon may also refer to:

== Places ==
- Adon, Loiret, France

== People ==
- Adon P. Brown (1873–1942), American lawyer and politician
- Adon Gomis (born 1992), French footballer
- Adon Shuler (born 2004), American football player
- Ado of Vienne, (French: Adon; died 874) archbishop, saint and author of a martyrology
- Adon, a Philistine king during the 7th century BCE
- Joan Adon (born 1998), Dominican baseball player
- Pilar Adón (born 1971), Spanish writer and translator

== Other uses ==
- ADON, assistant director of nursing
- Adon (Street Fighter), a character in the Street Fighter franchise
- El Adon, a Jewish liturgical poem
- In the Tanakh Adon may be used for men and angels as well as to El
- Greek Adonis, an adoption of Tammuz

== See also ==
- Adonai (my lord), in Jewish tradition is used as a euphemism to refer to God
- Add-on
