= Fudge factor =

Ad hoc element introduced into a calculation

A fudge factor is an ad hoc quantity or element introduced into a calculation, formula or model in order to make it fit observations or expectations. Also known as a correction coefficient, which is defined by
$$\kappa_\text{c} = \frac{\text{experimental value}}{\text{theoretical value}}.$$

Examples include Einstein's cosmological constant, dark energy, the initial proposals of dark matter and inflation.

== Examples in science ==
Some quantities in scientific theory are set arbitrarily according to measured results rather than by calculation (for example, the Planck constant). However, in the case of these fundamental constants, their arbitrariness is usually explicit. To suggest that other calculations may include a "fudge factor" may suggest that the calculation has been somehow tampered with to make results give a misleadingly good match to experimental data.

=== Cosmological constant ===
In theoretical physics, when Albert Einstein originally tried to produce a general theory of relativity, he found that the theory seemed to predict the gravitational collapse of the universe: it seemed that the universe should be collapsing, and to produce a model in which the universe was static and stable (which seemed to Einstein at the time to be the "proper" result), he introduced an expansionist variable (called the cosmological constant), whose sole purpose was to cancel out the cumulative effects of gravitation. He later called this "the biggest blunder of my life".

== See also ==
- Anthropic principle
- Confidence interval
- Plug (accounting)
