= Plug board =

Plug board may refer to:

- Plugboard, a component of certain encryption machines, unit record equipment and some early computers
- Telephone switchboard, another name for a manual exchange
- Power strip a device that plugs into a power socket to increase the number of power sockets available for other devices

== See also ==
- Patch panel, a number of circuits, usually of the same or similar type, which appear on jacks for monitoring, interconnecting, and testing circuits in a convenient, flexible manner
- Plug (disambiguation)
- Perforated hardboard, tempered hardboard which is pre-drilled with evenly spaced holes. The holes are used to accept pegs or hooks to support various items, such as tools in a workshop
