= Plug-in =

Plug-in, plug in or plugin may refer to:

- Plug-in (computing), a software component that adds a specific feature to an existing computer program
  - Audio plug-in, adds audio signal processing features
  - Photoshop plugin, a piece of software that enhances the functionality of Adobe Photoshop
- Plug-in electric vehicle, type of electric vehicle
  - Plug-in hybrid, a type of plug-in electric vehicle
- Glade PlugIns, fragrance distribution product
- Plug Ins, chain of electronics stores owned by Al-Futtaim Group

== People with the surname ==
- Vladimir Plugin (1937–2003), Russian historian and art historian

== See also ==
- AC power plugs and sockets, two- or three-pronged wall electrical outlets
- Add-on (disambiguation)
- Browser extension, which modifies the interface and/or behaviour of web browsers
- Change of variables, a mathematical procedure wherein substitutions are made in a formula
- Plug and play, a common standard for hardware equipment installation
