= Add-on =

== Software ==
- Plug-in (computing), a piece of software which enhances another software application and usually cannot be run independently
  - Browser extension, which modifies the interface and/or behavior of web browsers
  - Add-on (Mozilla), a piece of software that enhances and customizes Mozilla-based applications
- Expansion pack, an add-on for a video game

== Hardware ==
- Peripheral, an optional computer hardware component that supplements or enhances the functionality of the original unit
- Video game accessory, a piece of hardware used in conjunction with a video game console for playing video games

== Other ==
- An extension to a house
- Addon, a person named in the Hebrew bible
- An adjuvant therapy, an add-on therapy to existing treatment

== See also ==
- Plug-in (disambiguation)
