= Plug (accounting) =

A plug, also known as reconciling amount, is an unsupported adjustment to an accounting record or general ledger. Ideally, bookkeeping should account for all numbers during reconciliation, i.e. when comparing two sets of accounting records to make sure they are in agreement. However, discrepancies, i.e. unintentional accounting errors can occur, for example due to data entry, or an adding or a rounding error. An organization may use a plug for an immaterial amount, because it may not be cost effective to search through numerous pages of transactions to find the error. The acceptability of a plug depends upon the amount: a plug must be immaterial (e.g. too small to have significant impact on financial statements or decision-making) in order to be justified.

== Definition ==
The most basic definition of a plug may be "a placeholder number which is used in an overall cost or budget estimate until a more accurate figure can be obtained".

Plugging has been described as "the use of false numbers in financial ledgers that forces balances, and effectively masks accounting errors and control deficiencies".

== Consequence ==
Dependence on plugging has been described as "indicative of a dysfunctional finance and accounting system".

== Examples ==
Accounting malpractice at the US Defense Department was investigated in 2013 by Reuters. At the Defense Finance and Accounting Service (DFAS) superiors ordered accountants to make unsubstantiated change actions and enter false numbers. In the Cleveland DFAS office, unsupported adjustments to make balances agree totaled $1.03 billion in 2010 alone, according to a December 2011 General Accounting Office report.

== Difference to creative accounting ==
Creative accounting may follow the letter of the rules of standard accounting practice, yet deviate by excessive complication creating opaqueness, whereas plugging the numbers deviates from accounting rules for a relatively "immaterial amount".

== See also ==
- Fudge factor
