= Glossary of equestrian terms =

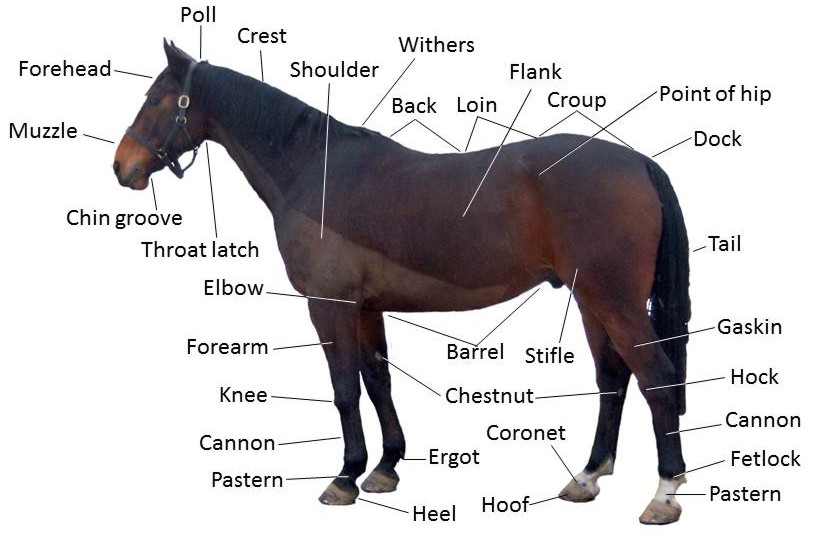
Parts of the horse

This is a basic glossary of equestrian terms that includes both technical terminology and jargon developed over the centuries for horses and other equidae, as well as various horse-related concepts. Where noted, some terms are used only in American English (US) or British English (UK), or are regional to a particular part of the world, such as Australia (AU).

== A ==
ace
Slang for the drug acepromazine or acetyl promazine (trade names Atravet or Acezine), which is a sedative commonly used on horses during veterinary treatment, but also illegal in the show ring. Also abbreviated ACP.
action
The way a horse elevates its legs, knees, hock, and feet. Also includes how the horse uses its shoulder, humerus, elbow, and stifle; most often used to describe motion at the trot, but sometimes applied to the canter or gallop. High action is a breed characteristic of Saddlebreds and other breeds used in saddle seat and certain harness disciplines.
aged horse
An older horse. Originally referred to a horse with a "smooth mouth", generally eight years old or older, but modern use varies. Term may refer to an animal seven years old or older, nine or older, or ten or older. In horse racing and in some horse shows, an aged horse is one over 4 years. In some contexts, an aged horse is older than 15 years of age.
aging
The process of estimating a horse's age by inspecting its teeth.
agistment (AUS)
Letting/leasing pasture to horse (or other livestock) owners.
agister (UK)
An official of the New Forest Verderers who controls grazing on the Forest by New Forest Ponies and other livestock.
AI
Abbreviation for artificial insemination.
aids
Signals from the rider or driver to the horse that tell the animal what the handler wants it to do. Generally broken down into two varieties, natural and artificial. Other divisions are possible. Natural aids include the hands, seat, weight, legs and voice Artificial aids which extend, reinforce, or substitute the natural aids include items such as whips, spurs, and martingales.
airs above the ground, airs
Movements in haute ecolé or "high school" classical dressage, where the horse leaves the ground with two or four feet in response to the rider's commands. Made famous by the Lipizzan horses at the Spanish Riding School, the airs include the levade, capriole, croupade, courbette, and ballotade. Sometimes called "school jumps".
amateur
An individual who exhibits horses but is not paid money or other compensation. The opposite of a professional.
amble

1. A general term for a range of four beat intermediate speed gaits that are approximately the speed of a trot or pace but smoother to ride. Various terms for lateral ambling gaits, based on style, speed, rhythm, and breed of horse, include the slow gait, single foot, running walk, stepping pace, sobreandando, paso corto, paso llano, rack, tölt, and paso largo. The term usually refers to lateral gaits, but may be applied to all four beat intermediate speed gaits, including the diagonal four-beat gait referred to by terms such as fox trot, pasitrote, and trocha.
2. The stepping pace. A specific intermediate speed horse gait, a slowed down pace. It is a four beat lateral gait, where the legs on one side of the horse move one immediately following the other, then the legs on the other side. It is a very smooth gait, and is natural to some breeds.
ankle
Common but inaccurate term for the fetlock joint.
arena
An enclosed area for training or riding horses.
artificial insemination
The practice of breeding a mare through human assisted means, with no contact between the stallion and mare. It is done for many reasons, including to protect the two animals, to allow a mare to be bred to a stallion a long distance away, or to allow a stallion to be bred to a larger number of mares than would be possible via natural cover.
astride
To ride with one leg on each side of the horse. Compare sidesaddle.
average earnings index (AEI)
The AEI measures the earning power of a Thoroughbred sire's progeny by comparing the average earnings of his runners with all other runners of the same age that raced in the same country during a given year.

== B ==
balk, balking (US, UK) or baulking (UK)
When a horse refuses to move. Multiple causes, including disobedience, fright, and pain or injury. See also nappy and jib.
barefoot, unshod
When a horse does not wear horseshoes
baroque movement
A type of horse movement with high, round and elastic strides with marked suspension, historically associated with the classical dressage horses of the 17th century riding halls of Europe, and seen today in breeds such as the Andalusian and Lipizzan. "Baroque horse" is a modern colloquial label used in some equestrian circles to describe horses with baroque movement, or with a conformation reminiscent of horses depicted in Baroque-period art, but it is not a formal or historically attested classification. The term "baroque pinto" is used by a modern registry to describe Friesian-influenced pinto horses marketed as baroque-type, but it does not represent a historical breed.
bearing rein, overcheck or checkrein
1. In driving, a strap used with driving harness to prevent a horse from lowering its head beyond a fixed point or to keep the head raised higher than natural. The strap runs from the harness saddle to the bit and may pass over the horse's head between its ears (overcheck), or run through metal loops on the bridle beside its ears (bearing rein), or run directly from harness saddle to bit. The terms are frequently used interchangeably.
2. In riding, a bearing rein is a term used to indicate when a rein is pressed on a horse's neck on the side towards the turn. Opposite of a neck rein.
bell boot
A type of protective boot worn by a horse.
billet (US), girth strap, girth point (UK)
A leather strap with punched holes, permanently attached in sets of two or three on each side of the tree of a saddle, used to hold and adjust the girth that holds on most types of saddle. See also latigo.
bit
An object, usually a metal bar, placed into the mouth of a horse, held on by a bridle and used with reins to direct and guide the animal. Occasionally made of other materials, including rubber. May be solid or jointed and may have rollers or other attachments added, usually in the center.
bitting rig or bitting harness
Tack used to train a horse to accept the bit or achieve a particular head carriage. Usually consists of a surcingle, side reins, and crupper.
black type
Bold-face type used in advertisements and sales catalogues to distinguish horses that have won or placed in an approved stake race. Winners receive upper case black type; second and third placed finishers have lower case black type.
bloodhorse, blood
A purebred Thoroughbred or Arabian.
blowing, blow
A sound made by a horse by sharply exhaling through flared nostrils. The blowing sound is not as long or loud as a snort, and may be produced with the head lowered. Most of a sound energy is below 3 kHz and most are audible within 30 metres. Horses may blow when curious, meeting another horse, shying or working. The term is also used when a working horse is allowed to pause and catch its breath, or "let him (or her) blow".
blue hen
A mare who consistently produces high-quality foals, many of whom go on to become champions. Commonly used in reference to horse racing breeding.
bolt, bolting
1. When a horse suddenly runs away, with or without a rider, usually after being frightened by something.
2. When a horse eats its feed too rapidly.
3. In Australian English, a bolter is a horseracing term meaning a horse with a remote chance of winning.
bone
A term of art in equine conformation to describe the quality of certain skeletal structures, particularly the lower leg.
1. "Good" or "poor" bone: technical terminology referencing the size and density of bone of the lower leg, which helps determine the weight carrying ability of a horse. "Good bone" refers to a horse with weight-carrying ability.
2. The characteristics of the lower leg as a whole, including the cannon bone as well as associated tendons and ligaments. "Flat" bone describes a positive feature where the tendons of the leg stand well away from the cannon bone, "tied-in" bone describes the negative characteristic of the tendon placed too close to the bone.
botfly, bot
A parasitic fly that lays its eggs on the legs, muzzle, and jaw of horses. The eggs are licked off by the horse and once ingested, hatch into maggots, called bots, which infest the animal by attaching to the stomach lining. The eggs may be scraped off the horse's hair with a bot knife or similar tool.
bowed tendon
An enlarged tendon along the cannon bone causing a bowed rather than straight appearance, resulting from tearing of the tendon or tendon sheath by stress or injury.
box stall (US)
See loose box.
boxwalking (UK)
A behavior exhibited in horses confined for long periods, where they move repetitively within their enclosure. See also weaving.
brand, branding
Permanently marking a horse for identification. Hot branding burns the skin with a hot iron, creating a hairless scar, while freeze branding causes deactivation of pigment cells, leaving white hairs, typically without scarring.
breeching
A wide strap around the rear of a horse
1. In driving, breeching is part of a harness with the purpose of keeping a wheeled-vehicle from bumping the rear of the horse. The purpose is to slow or stop a vehicle, and to "hold back" a vehicle on a downward slope. May also be pronounced britchin.
2. In riding, breeching is rarely seen but may be used to hold a saddle in position.
breeder
The breeder of a foal is the owner of its dam at the time of foaling.
breeding
1. The mating and care of horses to reproduce, usually through selective breeding practices.
2. The pedigree of an animal
3. A type of horse show competition where horses are led, not ridden. See halter class.
breed registry
See stud book.
bridle
Headgear placed around the head of a horse that holds the bit in place in a horse's mouth, including reins, used to direct and guide the animal. Sometimes used to refer to the entire piece of equipment, including headstall, bit and reins. Headstalls that do not have a bit are usually called a bitless bridle or, another variation of a bridle with no bit, a hackamore.
bronco or bronc
Originally an unbroken feral horse, now primarily a word for the horses used in rodeo bronc riding events, where the horse tries to buck off a rider. May describe any undisciplined horse, especially one that bucks. See also outlaw.
broodmare
A mare that is used for breeding.
broodmare sire
See damsire.
brothers-in-blood
Horses either by the same sire and out of full sisters, or out of the same dam and sired by full brothers.
buck
A behavior where the horse lowers its head and rapidly kicks its hind feet into the air. At liberty, seen as an expression of excess energy or high spirit, under saddle is generally the horse communicating it is in pain, and widely considered disobedient - except in sports such as the rodeo sports of Saddle bronc and bareback riding, where the horse is deliberately encouraged to attempt to dislodge its rider.
bumper pull
A horse trailer style that is pulled by a hitch attached to the frame of the towing vehicle at the rear. Contrast with gooseneck.
bute
Common term for Phenylbutazone, a non-steroidal anti-inflammatory drug (NSAID) used to control pain and swelling in horses. Some racing commissions and showing authorities restrict its use prior to competition in order to reduce the risk of injury to horses. It is banned in most endurance riding competitions.
by
Describes the relationship of a horse to its sire, in the context of its pedigree. A foal is by its sire and out of its dam.

== C ==
cannon or cannon bone
The third metacarpal or metatarsal bone of the lower leg. Analogous to the bones in the human palm or foot. In equines, is a very large bone and provides the major support of the body weight of the horse.
canner (US)
1. A horse of poor quality, referencing animals destined for slaughter. See also dogger.
2. Canner price: The lowest price likely to be paid for an equine, equivalent to the value of an animal to be sold by the pound and slaughtered for horse meat. Called meat-money in the UK.

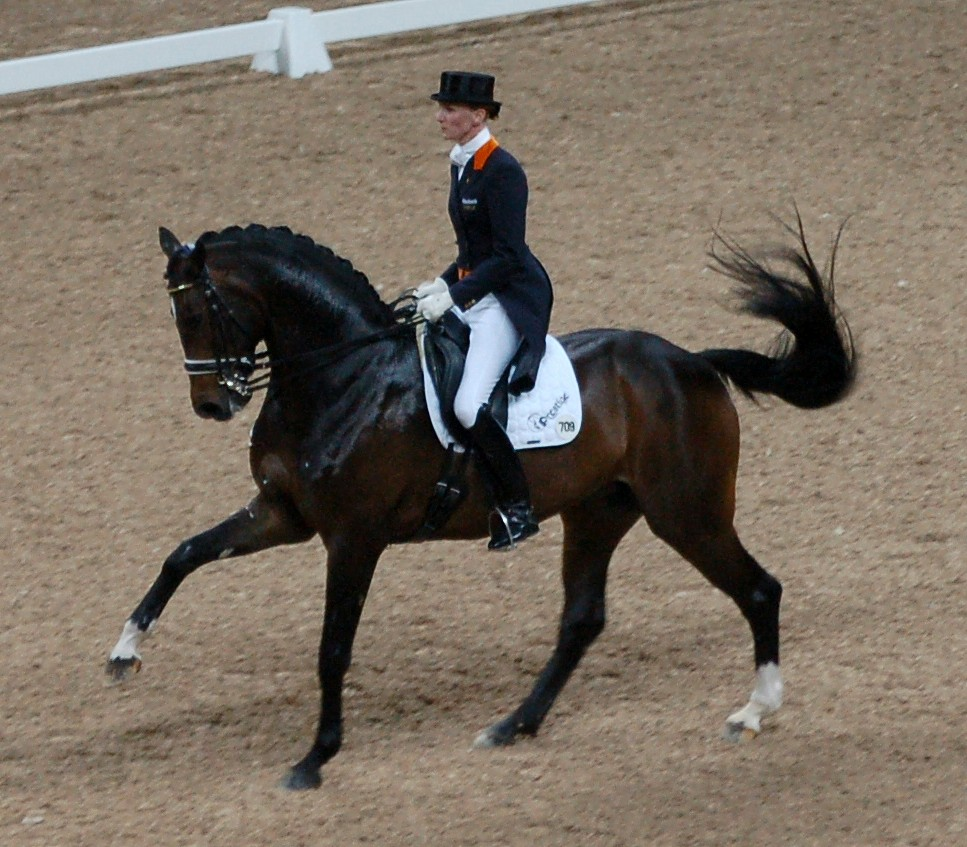
A horse cantering on the right lead

canter
A three-beat gait, with both front and rear legs on one side landing further forward than those on the other side. In western riding, the canter is known as a lope. The order in which the feet hit the ground varies depending on which legs are leading, but the gait begins with the outside hind, followed by the simultaneous landing of the outside front and inside hind, finished by the inside front. There is a moment during a canter when all four hooves of the horse are off the ground, known as the moment of suspension. A similar gait is the gallop which is performed at a higher speed, when the second beat is broken into two footfalls, making it a four-beat gait.
carriage
1. A two-wheeled or four-wheeled vehicle drawn by horses, and used for carrying people.
2. The way a horse carries itself, especially the way it positions its head and neck.
cart
1. A two-wheeled vehicle pulled by one or more horses (or other animals).
2. (Informal, US) A small, light four-wheeled vehicle, usually with bicycle-style tires, used primarily for show ring fine harness competition, and upper levels of pleasure driving.
cast, casting
1. Casting (UK), throwing (US): forcing a horse (or other large animal) to lie down, allowing safe veterinary or other treatment. Usually done by an arrangement of ropes or straps.
2. Cast: the state of an animal laying down that is unable to get up. May be due to illness or injury. Also occurs when a horse in a box stall (loose box) rolls over against a wall, trapping its legs against the wall.
castration
The act of neutering, or gelding a male horse.
chariot
1. Chariot (carriage): A cut-down coach, a four-wheeled vehicle seating two passengers facing forward. Pulled by a pair of horses, driven from a front driver's seat with a hammercloth, and with two footmen on a rear dummy board.
2. Chariot: a fast, light, open, two-wheeled conveyance drawn by two or more equids (usually horses) hitched side by side. Developed in antiquity and generally used for rapid conveyance, primarily seen today in reenactments and some niche uses for racing.
chef d'équipe
A person appointed to manage an equestrian team, generally at the state, national or international level.

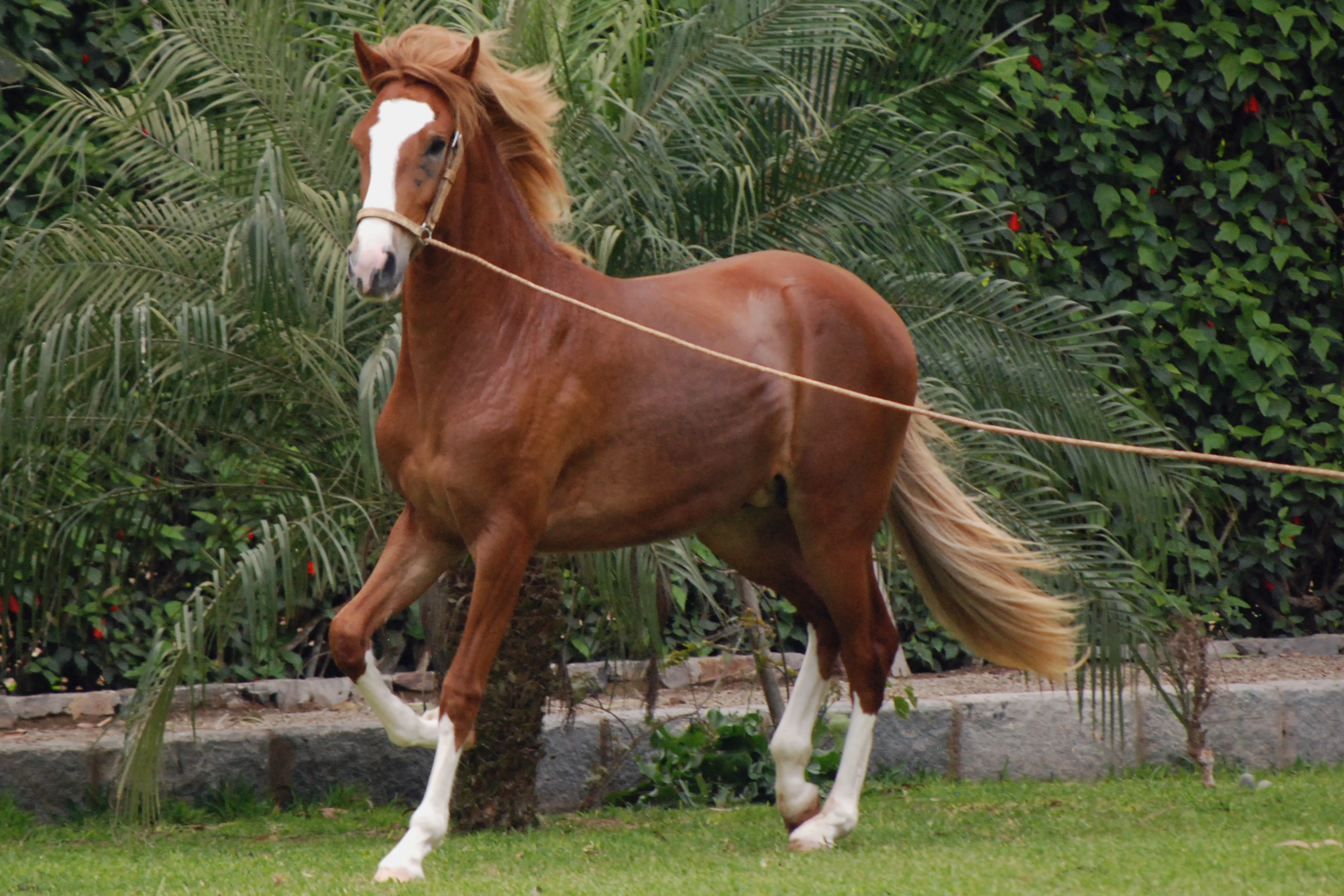
A chestnut-colored horse with chrome

chestnut
1. Chestnut (coat): A reddish-brown coat color with matching or lighter-colored mane and tail.
2. Chestnut (horse anatomy): A callosity on the inside of each leg, thought to possibly be a vestigial remnant of the pad of a toe. Not present on the hind legs of donkeys and zebras. See also ergot.
chesnut
A variation in spelling of the colour chestnut, the term chesnut is only used to describe the colouring of a Suffolk Punch horse.
choke
A condition arising from blockage of the esophagus, most often linked to a horse eating too fast. A horse that is choking can still breathe, but cannot eat or drink.
chrome
Slang for eye-catching white markings on a horse, usually stockings or socks. Also used to refer to particularly flashy pinto or leopard spotting.
cinch
A wide flat strap made of mohair, reinforced felt, or an equivalent synthetic material used in conjunction with a latigo strap to secure a western saddle onto the back of a horse.
clipping
Clipping the hair short on all or part of a horse. Different patterns have different names, such as harness clip, hunter clip etc.
clumper (AU)
A half bred draught horse. Also see heavy hunter.
coach
An enclosed carriage, usually drawn by two or more horses.
coach house (UK/Ir), carriage house (NAm)
A building used to keep a private carriage and horses, usually with accommodation for a groom, coachman or other servants above. Essentially a cottage or small house with stabling below.
cob
1. A stocky, rather small horse, or a large pony. Often a general description, but also applied to certain breeds such as the Welsh Cob.
2. A bridle size designed for horses with small or short heads. Usually keeps a long browband and throatlatch to accommodate the wide forehead and jowls of cobs and other horses with somewhat wedge-shaped heads, such as the Arabian or the Morgan.
cold-backed
A horse that arches its back and may buck slightly when first mounted.
cold-blood
Any of a group of equine types including draught horses and many ponies, characterized by a steady temperament, strength and stamina, but no great turn of speed. Refers to temperament, not literally to body temperature. See also hot-blood and warmblood.
colic
Any of a number of painful digestive disorders, usually characterized by intestinal displacement or blockage. A leading cause of death among domesticated horses.
colt
A young male horse that has not been gelded (neutered). For Thoroughbreds, a colt is under four years of age; in most other breeds and contexts, a colt is under three years of age. Sometimes used incorrectly to refer to any young horse. Compare stallion.
combined driving
A driving competition that goes up to the international level. Individual events are offered for single horses and teams, and competition incorporates three distinct elements: Dressage, Cross-country Marathon, and Obstacle Cone Driving.
combined training
See eventing.
conformation
The shape and proportion of a horse's body.
coronary band or coronet
The area directly above the horse's hoof: a ring of soft tissue just above the horny hoof that blends into the skin of the leg. Includes the bottom of the middle phalanx bone.
counter canter
A form of the canter where the horse is deliberately asked to canter on a curve with the outside leg leading, which is opposite of usual. Also known as galop faux, false canter, or counter lead. It is used to help build muscle and suppleness in a horse. See also lead.
coupling
The sunken area below the lumbar vertebrae or the horse's back, behind the last rib and in front of the point of the hip. Ideally is to be as short as possible. The term is sometimes expanded to include where the lumbar region attaches to the sacrum.
cover
Mating in horses: a stallion is said to cover a mare. See also "natural cover" and "artificial insemination".

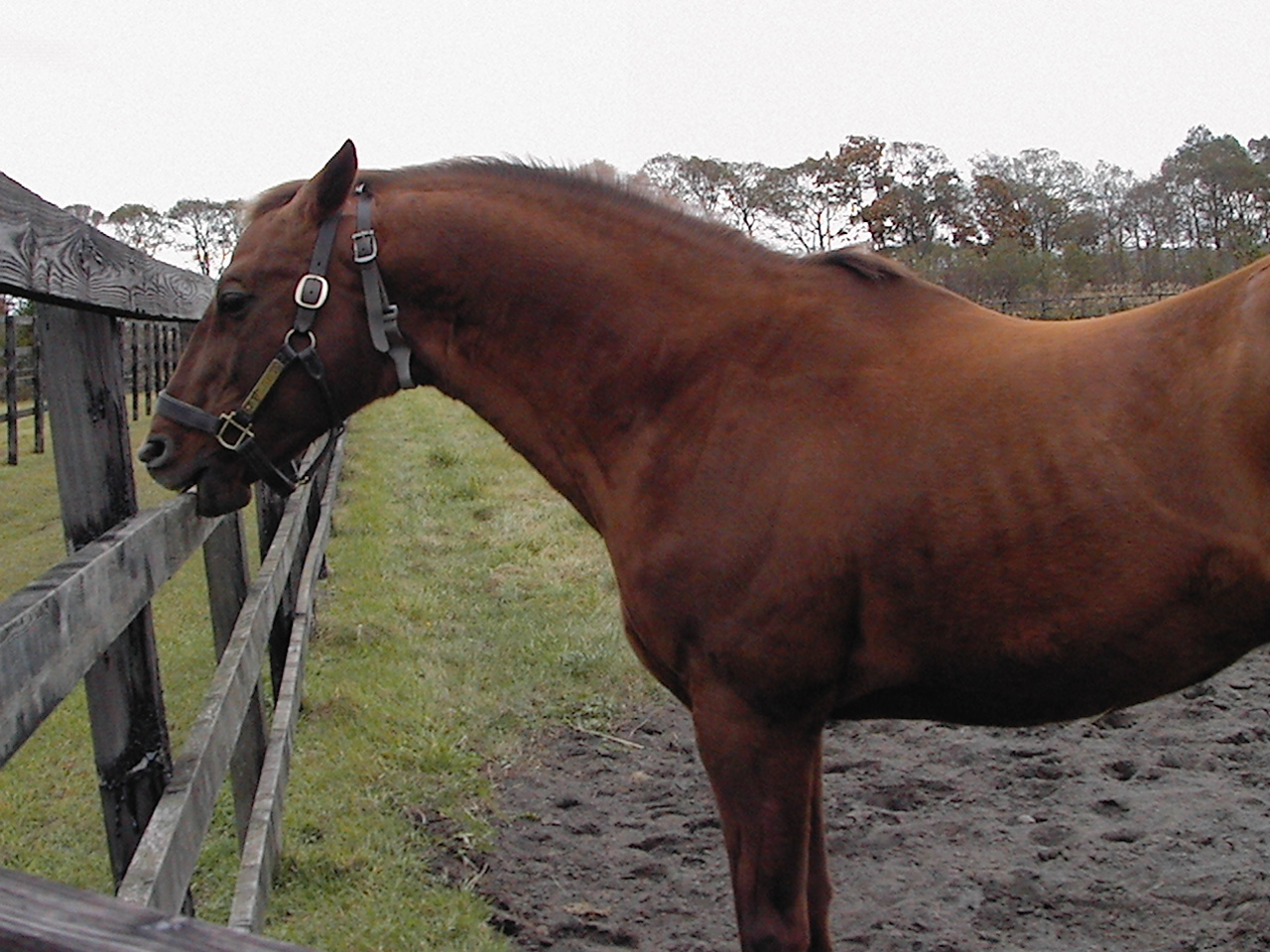
This cribbing horse is fitted with a specialized neck strap designed to discourage this behavior

cribbing (US) or crib biting (UK)
A stable vice where the horse grabs the edge of an object such as a stall door with its incisor teeth and arches its neck. More severe cases also suck air in simultaneously, and this is termed 'windsucking'.
crop
1. Crop (implement): A stiff, short-handled whip seen most often in English riding.
2. All the foals sired in one year. Often used to refer to one particular stallions' foals born in the year, but can also refer to a particular owner, an entire breed, or a region or worldwide crop.
crossbred
A horse that is a cross between two known breeds. Not to be confused with grade.
croup
The topline and immediate underlying musculature of the hindquarters. Runs from the tail to the loins, and from the point of the hip to the point of the buttock.
crowhop (US)
A mild form of bucking, a stiff-legged hop with a rounded back. Does not involve kicking up the back legs.
crownpiece (US), headpiece (UK)
The portion of a headstall that goes behind the horse's ears.
crupper
A padded strap fitted high under the horse's dock with straps running to the saddle, harness saddle, or surcingle to keep those pieces of tack from sliding forward.
curb
1. Curb bit: A type of bit that has bit shanks. It applies leverage pressure to a horse's mouth when the reins are tightened. The degree of leverage depends on the length of the shank and the positioning of the bit mouthpiece on the shanks. Is used in conjunction with a curb chain or curb strap so that when the reins are tightened, pressure is also applied to the chin groove and the headstall applies pressure on the poll of the animal. generally characterized by a solid bit mouthpiece of varying designs, but may have a jointed mouthpiece, sometimes mistakenly called a "snaffle". Compare to snaffle.
2. Curb (horse): Several possible types of lameness for which clinical signs include a swelling on the back of the lower leg. Any of a collection of soft tissue injuries of the distal plantar hock region.

== D ==
daisy cutter
A horse that moves with long but low movement. Considered highly desirable in hunter-type horses.
dam
The mother of a horse.
dam line
See distaff, tail-female.
damsire
The sire of the dam of a horse, analogous to the maternal grandfather in humans. Often known as the broodmare sire or maternal grandsire.
destrier
A medieval war-horse.
diagonal
1. At a trot, the set of legs that move forward at the same are the "diagonal" pair.
2. When a rider posts while riding at the trot, they can rise either matching when the left or the right foreleg and opposite hind leg hits the ground. If they sit when the left foreleg strikes, they are on the left diagonal, if they sit when the right foreleg strikes, it is the right diagonal. When riding clockwise, the rider is to post the left diagonal, when riding counter-clockwise the rider is to post the right diagonal. In other words, when riding a circle, the rider sits when the outside front and inside hind legs are on the ground.
3. In dressage tests, a line crossing the center of the competition ring running from one end corner to the opposite end corner. The diagonal is also used in some driving competition as the route for competitors to safely change direction in a ring or arena when there are a large number of entries.
distaff
In racing, refers to female horses. Named for the distaff, a spindle used in weaving and traditionally associated with women. In pedigree charts, refers to the entire dam's side of the pedigree.
dock
1. The muscular portion of a horse's tail, where the hair is rooted. Sometimes refers only to the upper portion of this area, where the tail attaches to the hindquarters.
2. Docking: to cut a horse's tail at the dock, seen most often on carriage horses to keep the tails from becoming caught in the harness. Traditionally referred to the practice of cutting the muscle and bone, though in modern use, sometimes refers only to the cutting of tail hair.
dogger (AU)
An animal to be used for pet meat, or a buyer of cattle or horses to be used for this purpose. See also canner.
draft horse
Generic term encompassing many breeds of large, muscular, heavy horses developed primarily as farm or harness horses, used for plowing fields, pulling wagons, logging and similar heavy pulling work. Spelled "draught" in British English.
draught horse
British spelling of draft horse.

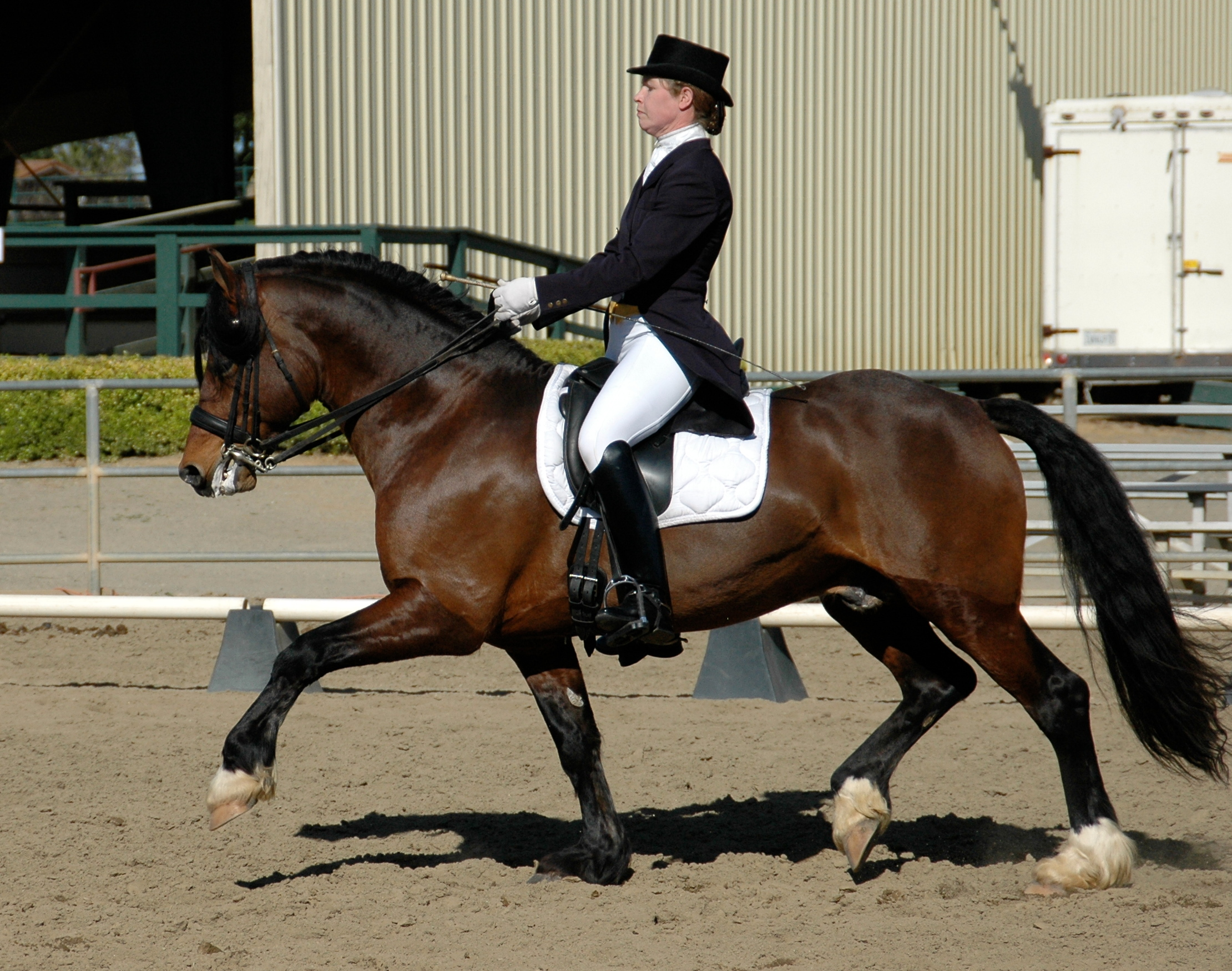
A horse performing dressage

dressage
1. A classical form of horse training, involving the gradual training of the horse in stages.
2. An Olympic level equine sport based on classical principles of horsemanship, involving taking tests designed to gauge the training level of horses in classical dressage. Lower levels of dressage competition are organized by national equestrian organizations, but the higher levels, including the Olympics, are governed by the Fédération Équestre Internationale.
drift
A New Forest term for the gathering of semi-feral ponies for marking, veterinary treatment or sale. See also muster and roundup.
driving
Guiding and controlling one or more horses from behind, such as from a horse-drawn vehicle, behind a plow or other implement, when pulling logs, boats or other loads, or when long-reining. Guidance is by long reins and voice, often using traditional commands characteristic of particular areas or cultures.
dry
Refers to a lean head with an absence of fatty tissue and raised veins on the skin, typical of desert-bred stock such as the Arabian horse.

== E ==
easy keeper (US) or good doer (UK)
A horse (or other animal) which needs relatively little food to maintain condition and may be prone to obesity.
endurance riding
A competitive sport of long-distance riding.
English riding (US), riding (UK)
The style of riding ubiquitous in the British Isles and other parts of northern Europe, and widely practised in other parts of the world, especially for disciplines such as dressage, show jumping, cross-country etc. Characterised by use of a relatively flat saddle; the bridle usually has a cavesson-style noseband, with reins carried in both hands and generally used with steady contact with the horse's mouth.

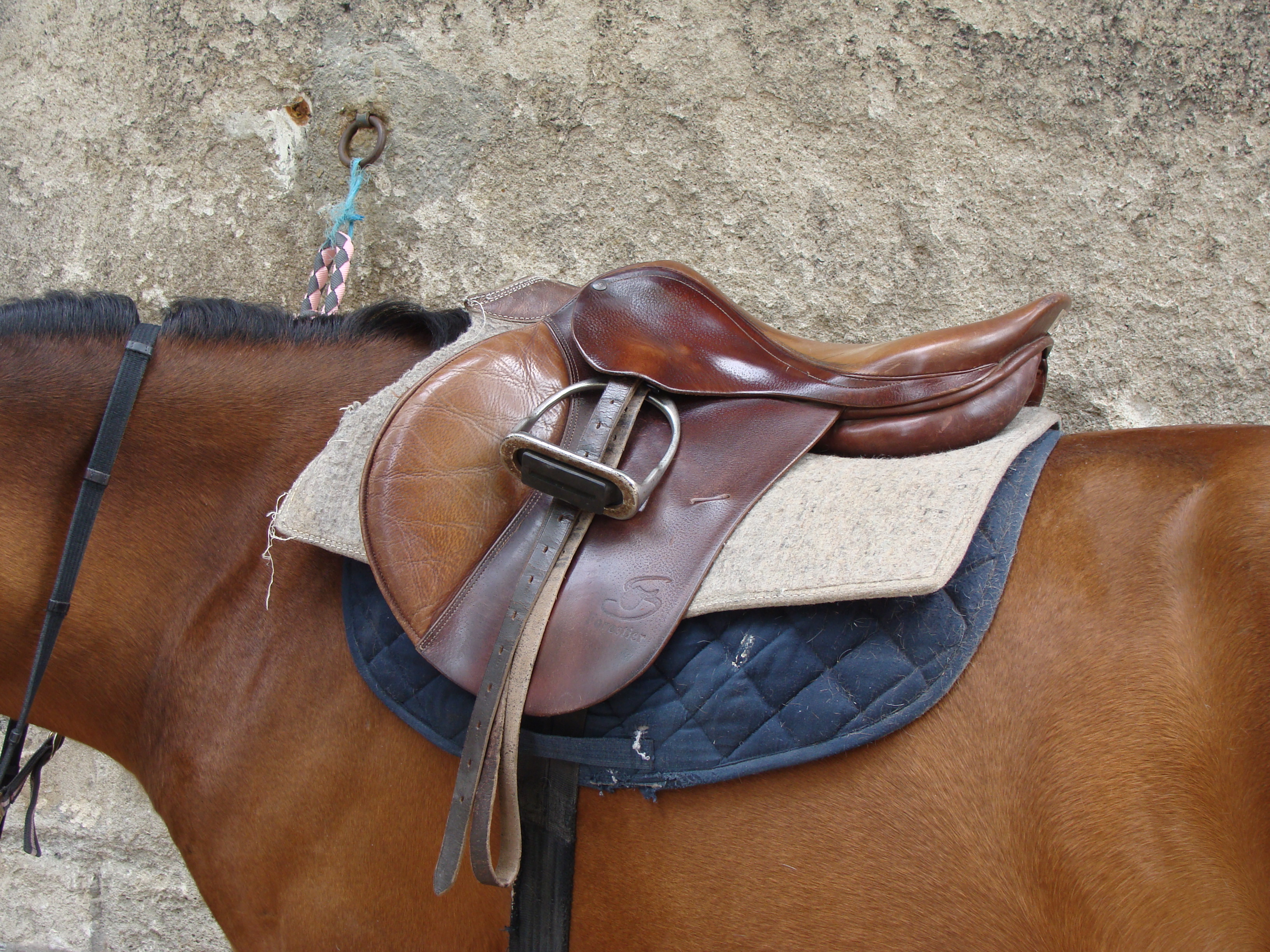
English saddle

English saddle
The type of saddle used with English riding; includes racing saddles and saddle seat saddles.
equestrian
1. An individual familiar with horses and horse handling. It can also refer to someone riding a horse. The feminine form is Equestrienne.
2. referring to the management and use of horses.
3. The Equestrian order, an upper-class social rank of Ancient Rome, akin to the later knight.
equestrianism
Also called horsemanship, the art of handling horses, particularly the art of riding, but also applicable to driving and other disciplines.
equine
Any member of the genus Equus.
equitation
1. The skill of riding a horse.
2. A term for competitive horse show events judged on the rider's ability instead of that of the horse.
equus
The genus including the horse, donkey, zebra and all other surviving members of the family Equidae.
ergot
1. A small callosity on the back of the fetlocks of equines, often concealed by feathering (hair). Thought to be a vestigial remnant of the pad of the toe. See also chestnut.
2. A fungus of the genus Claviceps growing parasitically on the seed-heads of grasses, and so sometimes occurring in fodder eaten by horses. Contains large amounts of alkaloids, including ergotamine. These can cause ergotism, a serious condition affecting the nervous and circulatory systems, sometimes leading to permanent injury or death.

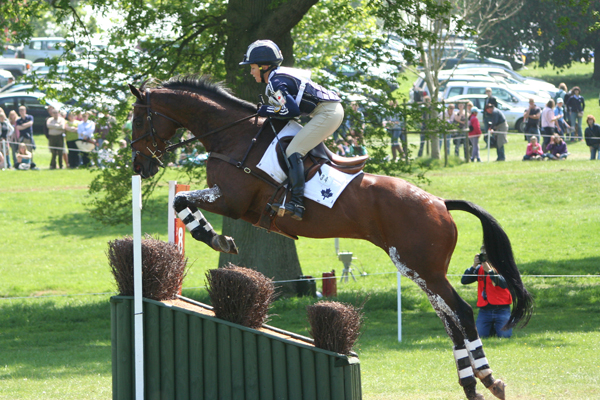
A jump in the cross-country phase of an eventing competition

eventing
Also called combined training. A competition that goes as high as the Olympic level which includes three types of riding: dressage, cross-country and show jumping.

== F ==
false martingale
A strap in horse harness passing from the collar, through the horse's legs to the belly band, to hold the collar in position. Unlike a true martingale, does not attach to the reins or head.

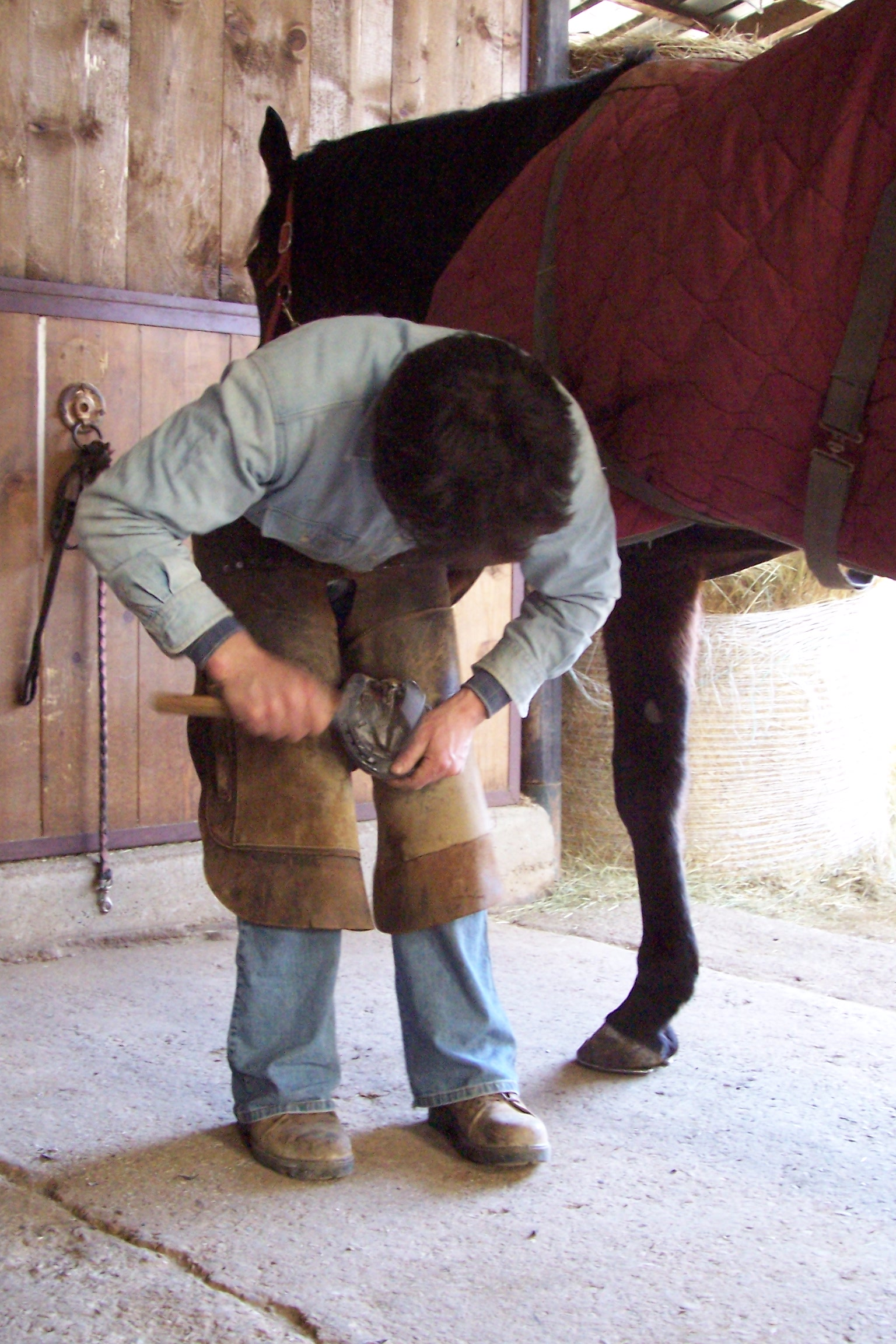
Farrier

farrier
1. A professional hoof care specialist who does hoof trimming and who also uses blacksmithing skills to do horse shoeing.
2. Someone who treats all aspects of horse health.
feathering or feather
Long hair on the fetlocks of horses. Most horses have some feather, at least in their winter coats, but in some types (especially certain heavy draft breeds) it may cover the feet and even extend up the rear of the legs. The feather is centered on the ergot on the rear of the fetlock.
Fédération Équestre Internationale
Abbreviated as FEI, the International Federation for Equestrian Sports is the governing body for most international-level equestrian competitions, including the FEI World Equestrian Games and the Olympics. It recognizes and governs ten disciplines: dressage, combined driving, endurance riding, eventing, horseball, para-equestrian, reining, show jumping, tent pegging, and equestrian vaulting. The FEI does not govern horse racing or polo.
feedbag, nosebag
A bag, containing food, that attaches to a horse's head.
feral horse
A free-roaming horse that lives in wild conditions, but is descended from domesticated ancestors – often erroneously called a "wild" horse. The best-known examples are the American Mustang and the Australian Brumby, but there are many other populations worldwide.
fetlock
The joint above the pastern. Anatomically, the metacarpophalangeal (front) and metatarsophalangeal (rear) joints of the horse, formed by the junction of the third metacarpal (forelimb) or metatarsal (hindlimb) bones (also known as the cannon bones) and the proximal phalanx distally (the pastern bone). Anatomically equivalent to the basal joint of a human finger or toe.
filly
A young female horse. Normally a horse under four years of age, but can also be used of a horse under three years of age. Any female horse that has had a foal is referred to as a mare, regardless of her age.
five gaited
A horse with five gaits: walk, trot, canter, rack, slow gait.
float
1. To rasp down sharp points that may form on horse teeth. Usually performed by a veterinarian or by an equine-dentistry specialist.
2. (Australasia) A horse trailer.
flying change
See lead change.
foal

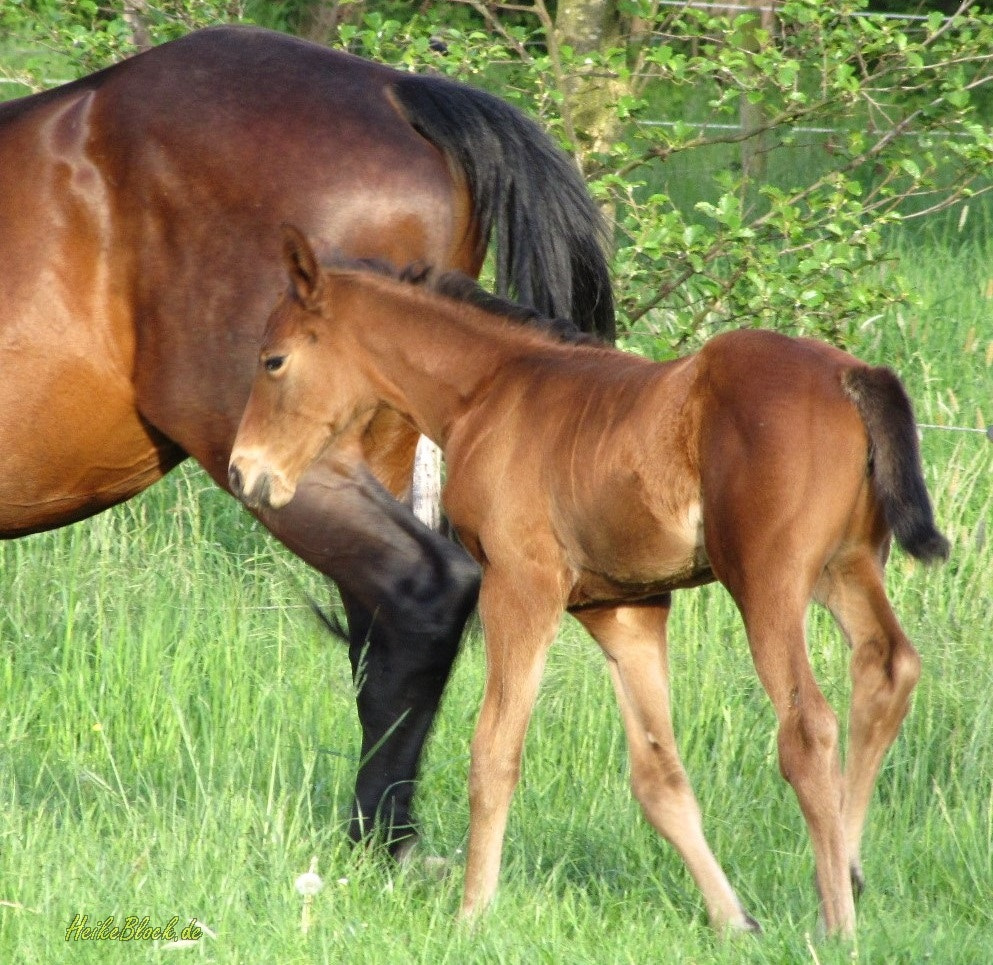
A foal

1. A young horse of either sex under the age of one year.
2. Foaling: the act of a mare giving birth.
foaling box (UK), foaling stall (US)
A large loose box providing space and privacy for a mare about to foal. Minimum size is usually 14 feet (4.3 m) square. Often provided with a small window or peep-hole (or in modern times a closed-circuit camera or webcam) for the owner or groom to watch the progress of the foaling.
form
1. In racing, the overall fitness of a horse to race. It includes factors such as how well it is currently working, what its breeding is, and how it has performed in the past.
2. In jumping, the style that a horse uses going over fences.
3. In equine conformation, the overall phenotype of the animal and its suitability for a given function.
founder
The most severe form of laminitis, an inflammatory condition affecting the laminae of the hoof. The third phalanx, or coffin bone rotates, often becoming deformed, and in severe cases, may puncture the bottom surface of the hoof. Severe cases may require euthanasia of the affected animal. A leading cause of death among domesticated horses, especially in breeds which are easy keepers (good doers).
foundation sire
A sire, or stallion, to which all members of a breed trace. Examples include the Byerly Turk, Godolphin Arabian, and Darley Arabian for the Thoroughbred breed; and Justin Morgan, aka Figure for the Morgan breed.
four-in-hand
A team of four horses with all their reins joined into one pair of reins, allowing one driver to control all of them. Also six-in-hand etc.
frog
A tough, rubbery, triangular part of the underside of a horse hoof that acts as a shock absorber for the horse's foot and also assists in blood circulation of the lower leg.
from
See out of.
full board (US), full livery (UK)
When a horse is kept at a stable other than that owned by the horse's owner, when the owner pays for complete care of the horse. Usually includes all feed, the rent of the stall and pasture, and cleaning of the stall. Often includes access to a riding arena and in some places may even include daily turnout or exercise. See also livery.
full-brother, full-sister
Animals with the same sire and the same dam.
furlong
A unit of measurement in flat horse racing. Equals one-eighth of a mile or 220 yards (200 m).
futurity
1. A stakes race for two-year-olds where the owners nominate the horse before birth and then pay additional fees as the horse grows up to continue the ability to enter the horse in the race.
2. A horse show competition for horses of a specified age, where the owners nominate the horse either before birth or as a young foal and then pay additional fees as the horse grows up to continue the eligibility to enter the horse in the class at the proper time. Futurities exist for many different horse breeds and equestrian disciplines.

== G ==
gait
The way a horse moves its legs is a gait. Gaits are divided into natural gaits which are performed by most horses (walk, trot, canter/lope and gallop), and those that are either trained by humans or are natural to a few breeds (ambling and pacing gaits).
gaited horse
A horse that performs intermediate-speed ambling gaits other than the trot, or in addition to the trot. Is a desired trait in some horse breeds, discouraged in others.
gallop
The fastest natural gait. At high speeds, the gallop becomes a four beat gait, rather than a three-beat gait: the second beat of the canter, where diagonal front and hind legs strike the ground simultaneously, is broken into two beats in very quick succession in the gallop.
Galloway
1. Horse type: Australian show horses standing over 14 hands and not exceeding 15 hands.
2. The Galloway pony, a now-extinct horse breed.
gelding
1. A castrated male horse of any age.
2. The act of castrating a male horse.
get
The offspring of a stallion. Compare produce.
girth
Wide, flat strap made of leather, canvas, cord, or similar synthetic materials, used in conjunction with billets at each end to secure most types of English and Australian saddles to a horse's back. See also cinch.
glass eye, wall eye
A blue eye on a horse. There is no difference in vision between a blue-eyed horse and a horse with the more common brown eye.
good doer
See easy keeper.
gooseneck

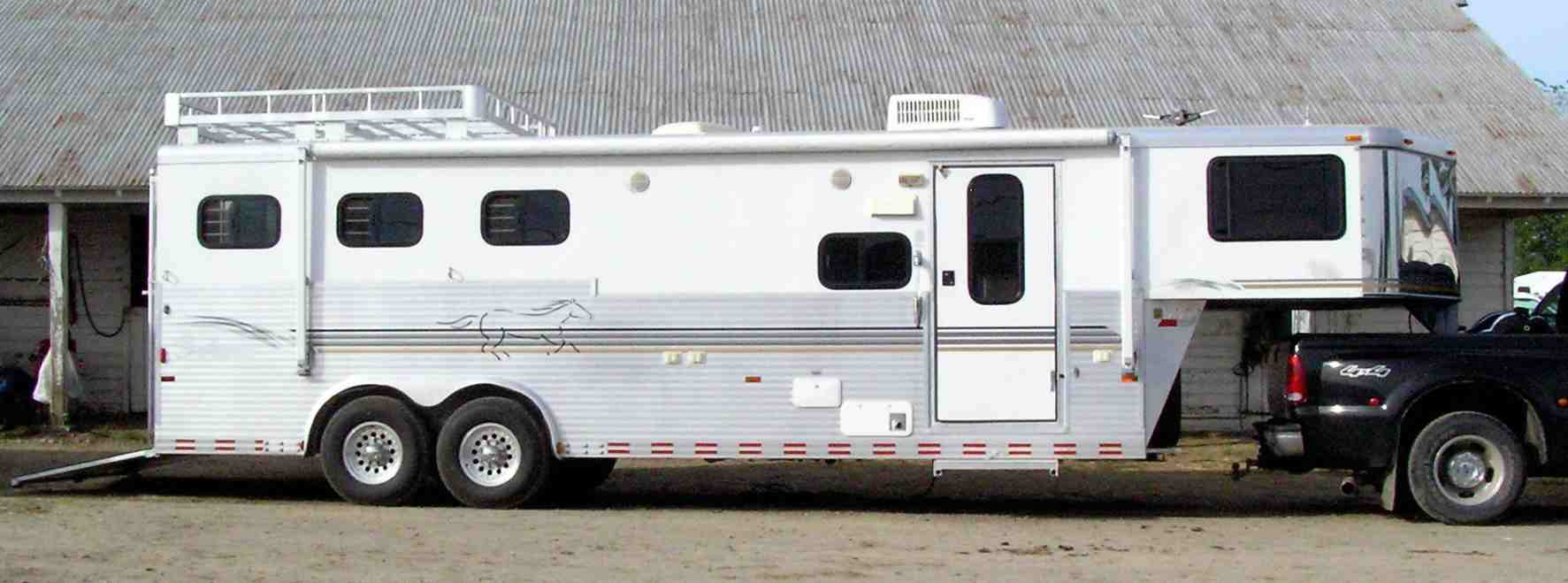
A gooseneck trailer

A type of horse trailer that attaches to a gooseneck hitch, placed in the bed of a pickup truck above the axle, rather than a hitch at the rear of the vehicle. The hitch connects to the underside of a long extension, or "gooseneck", that extends from the front of the trailer. Compare to "bumper pull".
grade, grade horse
A horse with only a small amount of recognizable breeding, or none at all. Generally an unregistered and unregisterable animal. Not to be confused with crossbred.
Grand Prix
In equestrian competition, the highest levels of either show jumping or dressage, generally governed by the rules of the FEI.
green
A horse or rider that is either untrained or has just started training.
green, green-broke
A horse that has just begun its training and is inexperienced with riders. Usually describes saddle horses, less often applied to harness horses.
groom
An employee who looks after horses. Also ostler or hostler (archaic).
grooming
Cleaning horses for hygienic, practical or esthetic reasons.
groundwork
1. To exercise or work a horse without a rider, controlling it from the ground.
2. In jumping, training a horse without jumping over fences.

== H ==
hack
1. A mediocre but useful horse.
2. An informal ride, usually for leisure or exercise (alsohacking or hacking out).
3. Show hack, a type of horse show competition, usually emphasizing obedience and excellent movement.

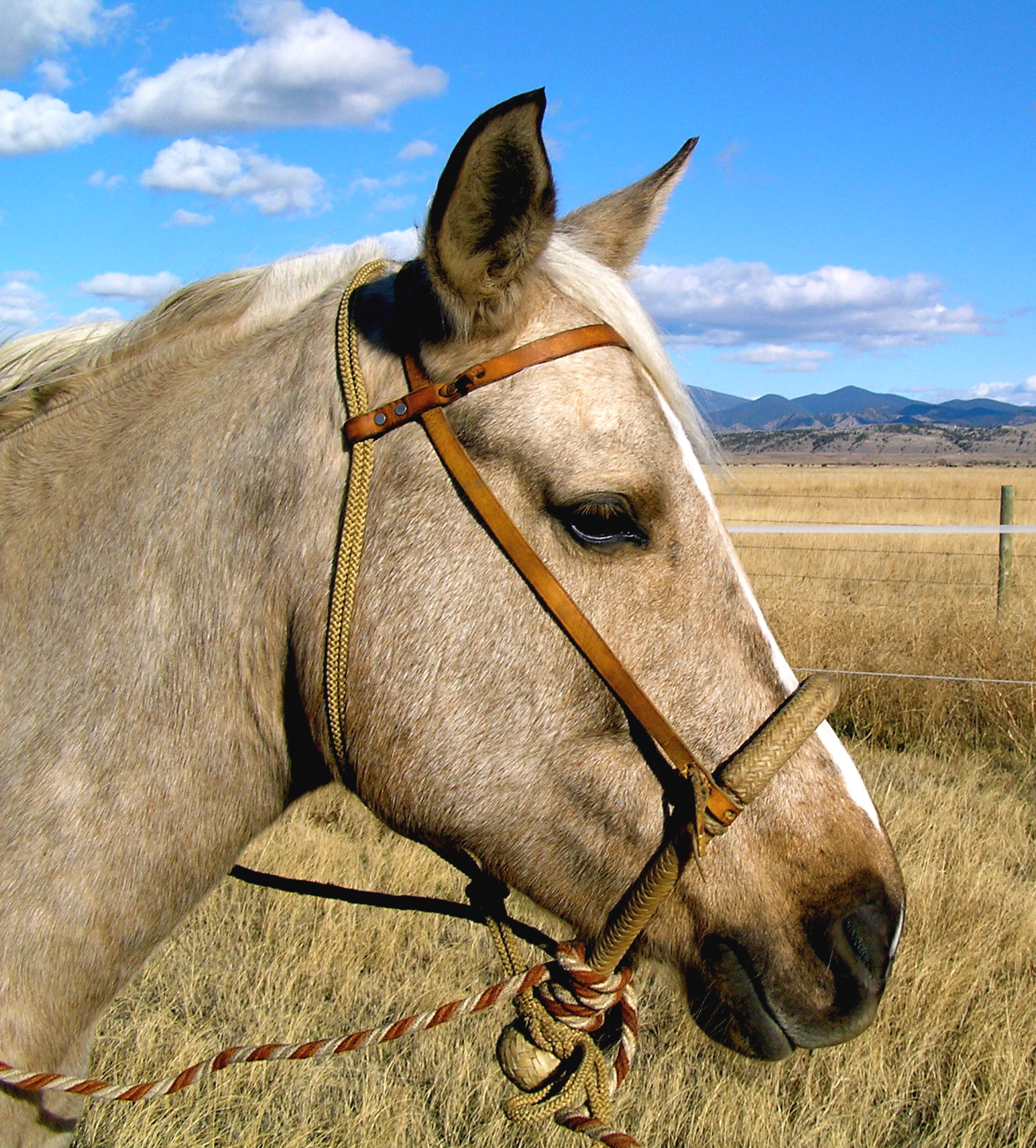
A bosal-style hackamore

hackamore
A type of headgear that utilizes a noseband or a bosal for control instead of a bit.
half-breed
1. A type of crossbred horse whose sire and dam are from different breeds.
2. (UK) A horse whose sire or dam is Thoroughbred, but the other parent is not. Such a horse is not eligible for registration in the General Stud Book, but can be registered in the Half-Bred stud book.
half-brother, half-sister
Two horses with the same dam. Two horses with the same sire are simply said to be by the same sire.
halter
1. (US) A device placed on the head of an equine for the primary purpose of leading or tying the animal; See also head collar.
2. (Australasia and UK) A rope headpiece with the lead rope attached; or a rolled leather headpiece of the same pattern used for leading and showing horses with refined heads.
halter class
A horse show competition where the horses are led, not ridden, and judged on their conformation. Also called in-hand or breeding classes.
hand
A measurement of the height of a horse. Originally taken from the size of a grown man's hand but now standardized to 4 inches. The measurement is usually taken from the ground to the withers. If expressed with a period and number after it, the number represents additional inches, so 15.3 hands ("fifteen-three") would be 15 times four inches, plus three inches – that is, 63 inches (160 cm). Abbreviated "hh" for "hands high" or simply "h".
hand gallop
A controlled gallop, with a speed between that of a canter and a full gallop. Derives from the fact that the gallop is under control of the rider's hand. Often used to show a horse's ground-covering stride in horse show competition.
hard keeper (US), poor doer (UK)
A horse (or other animal) which needs a relatively large amount of food to maintain condition.
haute école, high school
The most advanced form of dressage, wherein the horse performs the most difficult movements such as pirouette, passage, piaffe and one-tempi lead changes. In classical dressage, includes the airs above the ground as the final step in training.
harness

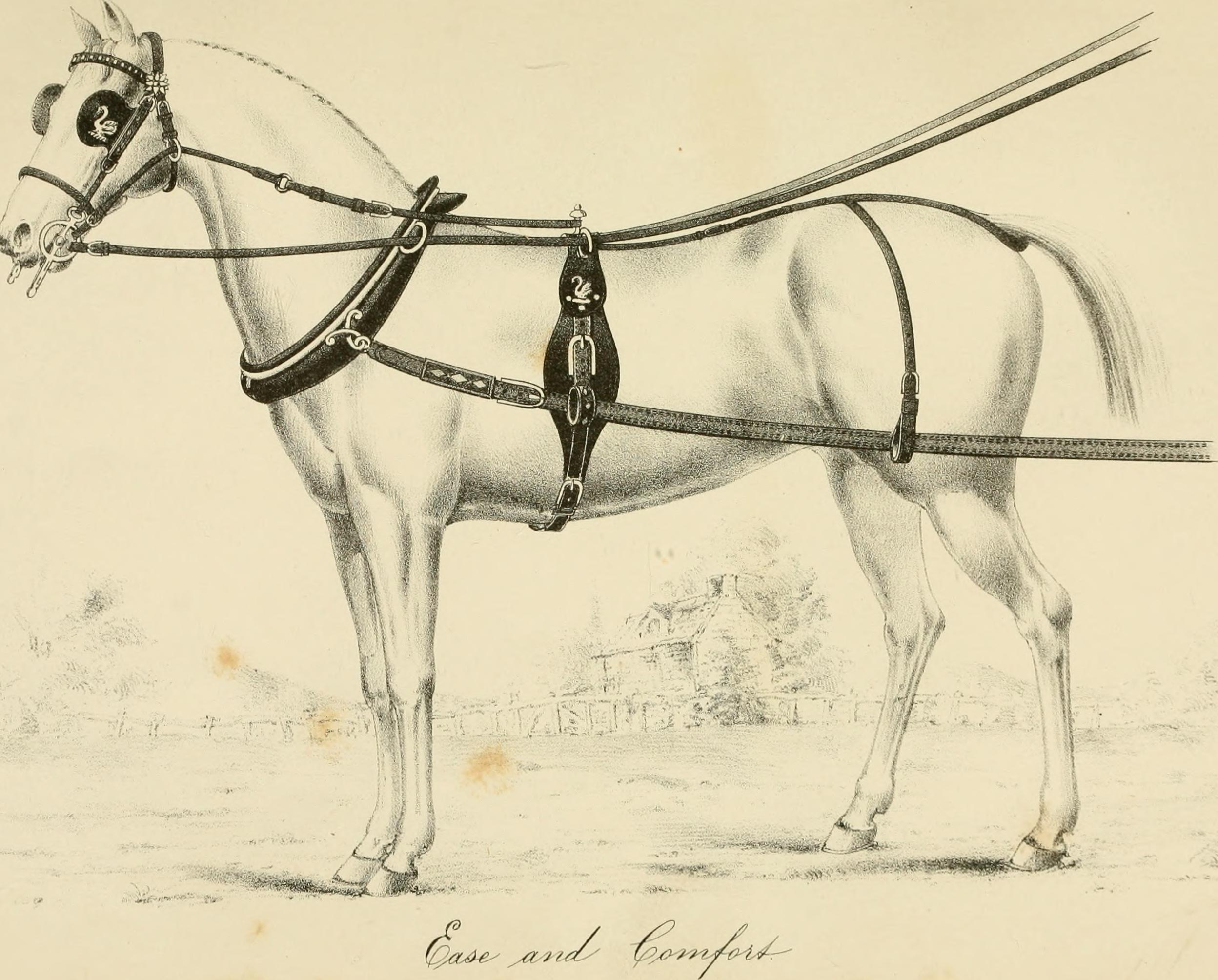
Harness

1. A type of tack placed upon a horse or other animal in order to hitch it to a cart, plow, wagon or other horse-drawn vehicle.
2. To harness a horse is to put the harness on the horse.
harness racing, trotting races
The sport of racing horses in harness, pulling a very light single-person cart called a sulky. The horses usually trot or pace.
hayloft, hay loft
A floored space above a barn or stable where hay is stored, often being fed through hatches in the floor directly into hay-racks in the animal enclosures below. The hayloft door is a high-level hatch (usually in a gable wall), through which hay could be loaded directly from a wagon.
head collar (Australasia and UK)
A device placed on the head of an equine for the primary purpose of leading or tying the animal; See also halter and headstall.
head shy, headshy
A horse which is reluctant to have its head touched or handled, making it difficult to groom and tack up.
headstall, head stall
1. The portion of a bridle that consists of the straps that go over the horse's head and under the throat, excluding the noseband, used to hold the bit in place.
2. An alternate name for a head collar (UK).
hinny, hinney
A sterile hybrid that is the offspring of a male horse and a female donkey. Generally considered less desirable than a mule, though has a similar appearance and characteristics. Bred less often than mules because the offspring are smaller than mules and female donkeys are less fertile with stallions than mares are with male donkeys. Also occasionally known as bardot or jennet.
hitch
1. The object attached to a vehicle to allow a trailer to be attached and pulled.
2. To fasten a harnessed horse to a carriage or other horse-drawn vehicle. (also: putting to).
3. To tie or tether a horse to a stationary object such as a post to keep it from wandering.
hitch and hop
A carriage driving term when one horse of a pair momentarily breaks its trotting stride to realign its gait to trot in synchronisation with the other horse creating a harmonised pair, in a 'hitch and hop' movement.
hobble
A strap or other device placed around the pastern of the leg to prevent a horse (or other livestock animal) from wandering far, usually by linking two or more legs together. A "half-hobble" attaches to only one foot, with the other end usually attached to a rope called a picket line.
hock
The tarsal joint of the equine hind leg, located midway between the horse's body and the ground. Anatomically corresponds to a human's ankle and heel, but in horses is located much farther from the ground.
horse
1. Wild Horse: Equus ferus.

a. Tarpan or Eurasian Wild Horse: Equus ferus ferus.
b. Domestic Horse: Equus ferus caballus.
c. Przewalski's Horse: Equus ferus przewalskii.

2. In some circumstances, may refer to members of that species that are taller than 14.2 hands high.
3. A male horse, particularly an uncastrated male horse.
horse blanket, blanket (US), rug (UK), sheet
A body covering made for horses that covers the animal's body from chest to rump, usually kept on the horse by buckles at the chest by buckles and by adjustable straps passing under the belly and sometimes around the hind legs. Heavier weight blankets assist in keeping the animal warm in cold weather, lighter weight designs are used in warm weather to deter insects and to keep the sun from bleaching out the horse's coat. Blankets may also have hoods or neck coverings added for additional protection of the animal.Compare to Saddle blanket, numnah.
horsecar
A tram pulled by a horse
horse-drawn
"Horse-drawn" indicates something that is pulled by horses. Horse-drawn vehicles include wheeled passenger or goods carriers such as carriages, coaches, wagons, and carts. Other things powered by horses include boats, rail cars, farm implements, and sleds.
horse passport
A document required in European Union countries for every equine animal, including a detailed description of the animal and a record of whether it is intended for human consumption. May be linked to a microchip implant.
horsepower (hp)
A unit of power, originally used to compare the power of mechanical devices to that of a draft horse. Roughly equivalent to the normal sustained power output of one horse – however the maximum power of a horse is much more than one horsepower. A metric horsepower equals approximately 735.5 watts, and an imperial horsepower (or imperial horsepower) equals approximately 745.7 watts.

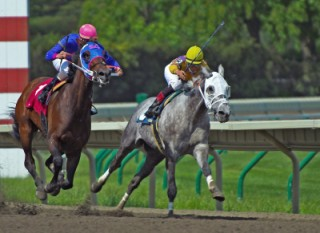
Horse racing

horse racing
The sport of racing horses, a major industry in many parts of the world. Racehorses are usually Thoroughbreds (or Arabs) ridden at the gallop, but other breeds are also raced. Horses or ponies may also be raced at the trot or pace, when they are usually in harness. See also harness racing.
horseshoe
A curved bar attached to the underside of the wall of the hoof, to prevent wear and provide grip. Usually made of steel and nailed to the hoof, but may be of aluminum or other materials, and may be glued on. Usually used on all four hooves, but sometimes only on the front, or not used at all (see barefoot).
horse show
An event with competitions where horses are judged or compete for points, ribbons, or prizes.
horsiculture (UK)
An informal term in UK land use planning, referring to land used intensively for keeping recreational horses, often with many small paddocks and numerous field shelters.
horse trailer (US), horse van, horse box (UK), horse float (Australasia)
A trailer or van designed to carry horses.
hostler (NAm), ostler (UK/Ir)
Archaic term for a horse groom. (See groom, above)
hot-blood, hot-blooded
Horses descended from oriental horse or eastern blood, such as the Arabian horse, Barb, Turkoman horse, and related breeds. Usually includes the Thoroughbred. See also cold-blood and warmblood.
hunt seat (US)
Classic form of English riding, particularly seen in hacking, trail riding, jumping.
hunter
1. Show hunter (US), hunter (US) or working hunter (US and UK): A type of horse and horse show competition judged on its movement, manners, and way of going, particularly over fences. A hunter should be graceful and keep a long frame on the flat and while jumping fences.
2. Field hunter (US), hunter (US, UKI): a horse used for fox hunting. Subdivided by weight: heavy hunter, light hunter etc.
3. Show hunter (British): a competition for horses that are shown on the flat, not to jump.

== I ==
in-hand
1. Leading, as opposed to riding, a horse.
2. An in-hand class is a type of horse show competition, where the horse is led, rather than ridden, and judged on its conformation and movement. See halter class.
3. In racing, a horse that is not running at top speed.
International Federation for Equestrian Sports
English translation of the French Fédération Équestre Internationale (FEI).
irons or stirrup irons
A type of stirrup made entirely of metal, seen on Australian stock saddles, English or racing saddles.

== J ==
jack
An uncastrated male donkey or ass.
jading (UK)
Deliberately causing a horse to balk (stop) by means of an unpleasant-smelling substance.
jennet
1. A small, gaited horse of the Middle Ages, developed originally in Spain, used as a riding animal. Also called a Spanish jennet.
2. A female donkey.
jenny
A female donkey. Occasionally called a jennet.
jerk line
A single line when driving multiple freight horses. The jerk line runs past all the horses to the lead horse's left bit ring. A single pull means to turn left; a series of light jerks means to turn right. In some cases, each [left] horse in line has its own jerk line.
jib (AU)
To refuse to go forwards, backwards or sideways as required by the driver or rider.
jockey
The rider of a horse in horse racing.
jog
A slow trot that is moderately collected, usually ridden without posting. Most often seen in western riding.
jump
1.

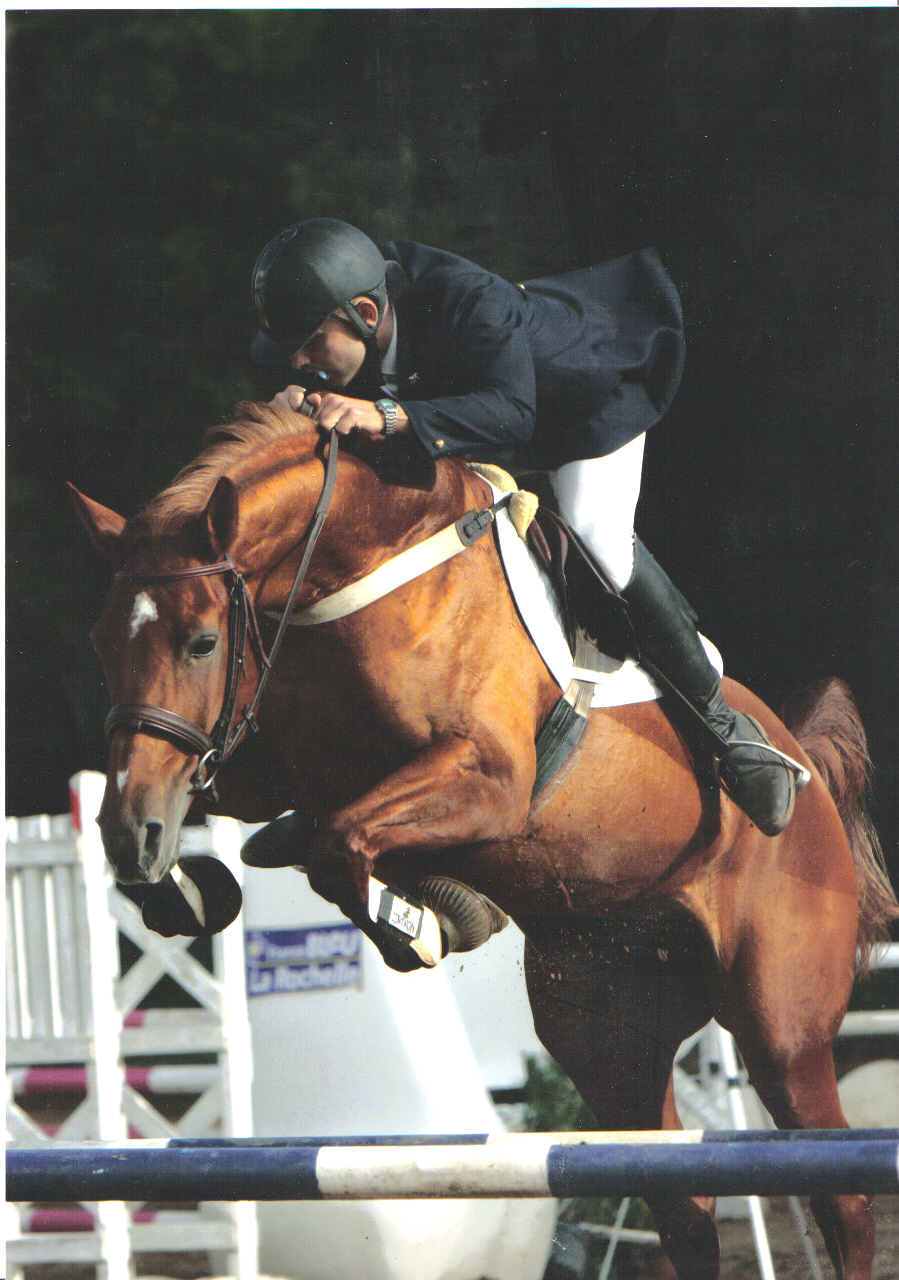
A horse jumping over an obstacle

Applied to horses, may refer to a horse jumping over an obstacle, or may refer to action where the horse simply leaps into the air, such as bucking, crowhopping, or pronking. Less often, applied to certain airs above the ground.
2. An obstacle, particularly one used in competition.
jumper
A horse that jumps, particularly in competition.

== K ==
kimblewick

A type of mild curb bit, named after the English town of Kimblewick.
knacker
A person who disposes of livestock animals unfit for human consumption, such as sick or injured horses.
knee
The joint of a horse's front leg between the cannon and the forearm. Anatomically equivalent to the human wrist.

== L ==
laminitis
Inflammation of the sensitive laminae of the hoof. Often linked to metabolic disturbances, often associated with obesity or ingestion of excess starches or sugars. Causes lameness and severe pain. Treatable if caught early, but in its most severe form, known as "founder", may require euthanasia of the affected animal.
lead
1. Lead (leg): the leading legs of the horse at the canter and gallop. The front and hind legs on one side of the horse appear to land in front of the other set of front and hind legs when the horse travels. On a curve, a horse is generally asked to lead with the inside legs, though there are exceptions to the general rule, such as the counter canter. See also lead change.
2. Lead (tack): a lead rope, lead shank or leading rein. A flat line or rope attached to a halter and used to lead the animal when the handler is on the ground.
lead change, change of leg
The act of a horse changing from one lead to the other. When performed at a canter or gallop, it is a "flying change". When the horse is dropped to a slower gait and then asked to canter again but on the opposite lead, it is a "simple change".
leader
Any of the horses in a driving team which are ahead of the shafts or pole. Can only pull the vehicle, not slow it. See also wheeler.
live foal guarantee
A guarantee that a bred mare will have a living foal from a breeding to a stallion. Usually offered by the stallion's owner and allows the mare to be rebred if for some reason the resulting foal is stillborn or is not living.
Liverpool bit
A type of adjustable curb bit used for horses in harness, allowing the horses in a team to be driven with the same rein tension.
livery yard, livery stable (UK), boarding stable (US)
An establishment where horses are housed for a fee. Horses may be kept stabled or on pasture. Services might include feeding, exercise and other care. See also full-board.
longeing (US), lungeing (UK, Australasia, US)
To work or train a horse at the end of a long rope or flat line (typically about 30 feet (9.1 m) in length), teaching it to obey voice commands and exhibit good ground manners, and to exercise it when not ridden (for reasons of youth, age, infirmity, trainer desire, etc.).
long-reining, long-lining, line driving, ground-driving
Driving a horse while walking behind or to the side of it, controlling the animal by use of very long reins. Used for training, both for riding and driving. For a riding horse, the stirrups are often used as makeshift terrets to keep the reins from trailing on the ground.
loose box (UK), box stall (US)
An enclosed area within a stable where a horse may be left untethered (loose). Minimum size is usually 10 or 12 feet (3.0 or 3.7 m) square up to about 14 feet (4.3 m) square.Contrast with tie stall, a smaller enclosure where the animal is kept tied or tethered. See also stall.
lope (US)
A form of the canter seen in western riding; a three beat gait, performed at a relatively slow speed.
loriner (UK)
A maker of metal parts for tack, harness, bridles, spurs, and other horse apparel.

== M ==
mare
A mature female horse, usually four years of age or older. Also denotes any female horse that has given birth, regardless of her age. Compare filly.
mare line
See tail-female.
markings
Generally refers to white markings on the horse's face, legs, and sometimes the occasional body spot on an otherwise solid-colored horse.
meat-money (UK)
The lowest price likely to be paid for an equine, equivalent to the value of an animal to be sold by the pound and slaughtered for horse meat. Called canner price in the USA.
martingale
A piece of tack that is used on horses to control head carriage, used for both riding and driving. See also false martingale.
mechanical hackamore
A type of bitless headgear for horses where the reins connect to shanks placed between a noseband and a curb chain.
mob (AU)
Australian term for a herd of horses.

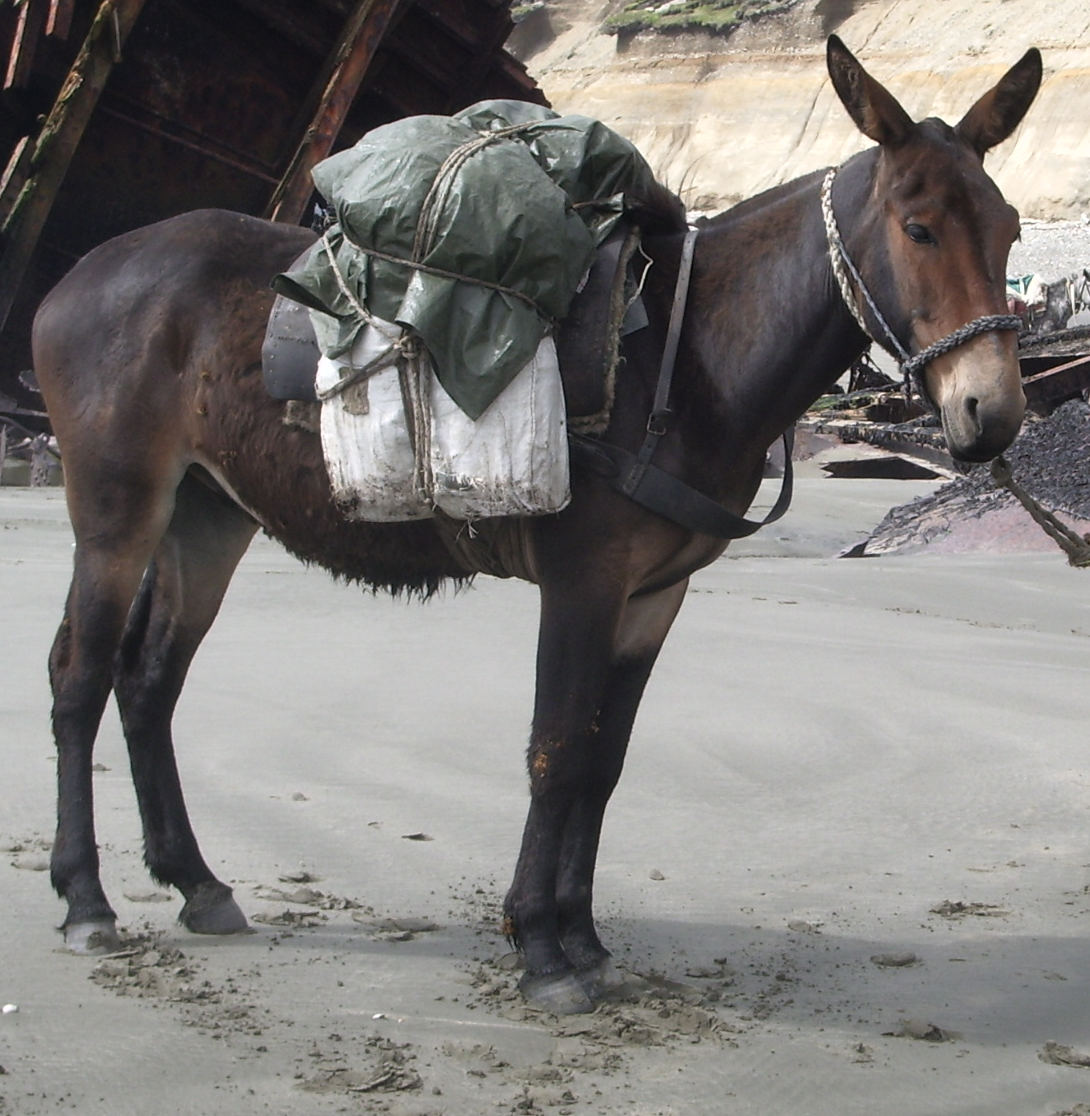
A mule

mule
The hybrid offspring of a male donkey and a horse mare. Almost always sterile. The hybrid with the reverse parentage (and somewhat different appearance and characteristics) is a hinny. Mules are noted for their sure-footedness.
muster (AU/NZ)
The assembling or roundup of livestock. See also drift and roundup.

== N ==
nappy, napping (UK)
When a horse is disobedient and refuses to go forward. See also balk and jib.
natural cover, live cover
The process of breeding horses through natural biological means without use of artificial insemination or other assisted reproductive technology. The only method of breeding allowed for the Thoroughbred horse breed.
near side
The left side of a horse. The traditional side on which all activities around a horse are done or start to be done.
neigh, whinny
A sound made by a horse. Generally a loud noise, described as a squeal followed by a nicker. Often is heard when a horse is looking for a companion, or to call out to unseen animals.
nicker, whicker
A soft noise made by horses, the horse makes a vibrating sound with its mouth closed using the vocal cords. Often used as a greeting, the softest version used by a mare communicating to her foal. Louder versions may be heard when a stallion is communicating with a mare.

A numnah under an English saddle

numnah (UK)
A saddle pad used beneath the saddle to protect the horse's back, often shaped to fit the saddle rather than being rectangular. May be fairly thin, or well padded, and may be made of sheepskin.

== O ==
off side
The right-hand side of a horse.
omnibus
Large vehicle transporting many people.
on the bit
A horse who is flexed at the poll, moving forward well, holding the bit without fuss, and is responsive to the rider.
ostler

out of
Describes the relationship of a horse to its dam, in the context of its pedigree. A foal is by its sire and out of or from its dam.
outlaw
A horse that is vicious or cannot be handled by humans.

== P ==
The pace

pace
1. A two-beat, lateral gait where the front and hind legs on the same side move forward at the same time. Difficult to ride, but the fastest of the intermediate gaits, particularly seen in harness racing and the "flying pace" of the Icelandic horse.
2. In horse racing, may refer to the speed of the leaders of a given race,i.e. "setting the pace" or "off the pace".
3. The speed of a horse or, as a verb, to regulate the speed of a horse, particularly over distance.
4. A group of asses, also known as a passe.
paddock
1. A fenced enclosure where horses are kept.
2. In racing, the location where the racehorses are mounted before a race and unsaddled after a race.
pair
Two horses harnessed side-by-side. Often the same animals will always be worked the same way around. See team and tandem.
parrot mouth
A congenital malformation of the upper jaw where the incisor teeth protrude beyond the lower jaw. Sometimes known as overshot.
pastern
The segment of the leg between the fetlock and the coronary band.Anatomically, two short bones, the proximal phalanx and the middle phalanx.
pedigree
1. The known and documented lineage of an animal.
2. The written pedigree chart outlining the lineage of an animal.
performance class
A category of horse show classes where horses are exhibited in harness or under saddle and judging is based on how they perform the tasks asked of them. May also refer to equitation classes, where the skill of the rider is judged. Contrast to a halter class which is judged solely on the horse's conformation. Compare Halter, "in hand"
phenotype
The outward appearance of an animal, in contrast to genotype, the genetic inheritance of an animal.
pigroot or pigjump (UK and Australasia)
A form of bucking where the horse plants its forelegs and kicks out with the rear.
pinhooking
The practice of buying young horses with the specific intention of reselling them for a profit. Most often used in the context of buying Thoroughbred weanlings and yearlings.
plug
A common horse or broken down horse of no particular value.
points, point coloration
The tail, edges of the ears, mane, and lower legs of a horse. Used in determining the color of a horse.
points of a horse
Collective term in horse anatomy for the external parts of a horse, such as crest, withers, shoulder, cannon, etc.
pointing
Resting a foreleg; indicating soreness in that leg or foot.
pole
A single rigid bar extending from the front of a horse-drawn vehicle, positioned between a pair of horses, and harnessed to them. Allows the horses to steer and slow the vehicle. Compare shafts.
poling
Poling is the practice (usually illegal on horse show grounds) of deliberately hitting the legs of a show jumper while it is in the air over a fence, said to make it fold up its legs and jump higher.
poll
Anatomically, the highest part of a horse's head, between the ears. In riding, commonly refers to the point just behind the ears, "poll joint".
pony
1. In common use, a member of the species Equus ferus caballus of a horse breed that typically matures shorter than 14.2 hands (58 inches, 147 cm). Individual animals of breeds that typically mature over this height may still be called "horses" even if under the cutoff height. In some parts of the world, the cutoff is at 14 hands instead of 14.2.
2. Biologically, may be used to define small horses that retain a pony phenotype of relatively short height heavy coat, thick mane and tail, proportionally short legs, and heavy build regardless of actual mature height.
3. For competition purposes, depending on organizational rules and local tradition, may also be used for an adult horse of any breed of 14.2, 14.1, or 14 hands or less at the time of competition. The FEI, which uses metric measurement, defines the official cutoff point at 148 centimetres (58.27 in) (just over 14.2 h) without shoes and 149 centimetres (58.66 in) (just over 14.2½ h) with shoes.
4. Leading one horse while riding another.
5. A horse used in the sport of polo.
poor doer
See hard keeper.
posting
Also called rising to the trot. To rise up out of the saddle and then gently sit back down in rhythm with the horse's motion while it is trotting. Posting the trot is generally more comfortable for both rider and horse. See also diagonal.
produce
The offspring of a mare. See also get.
pulling
Trimming the mane or tail by pulling out the longer hairs.
purebred
An animal with documented parentage recognized by a breed registry as being descended in all lines from recognized foundation bloodstock and free of admixture of breeding from lines outside those of the breed in question. Not to be confused with Thoroughbred, which is a specific breed of horse with very strict standards for purebred status.
purse
Prize money in a competition, horse show class, or race.
putting to
, hitching
Attaching a vehicle to a harnessed horse.

== Q ==
quirt
Short-handled, flexible, weighted whip, of braided leather or rawhide. Used by some western-style riders.

== R ==
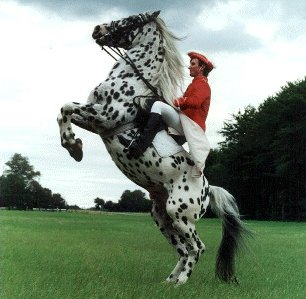
A rearing horse

rearing
When a horse rises up on its hind legs. If performed while being handled by humans, is usually considered a severe, dangerous disobedience. Occasionally, horses are trained to rear on command for uses such as film or circus work. Rearing may occur while an animal is loose, being ridden, or while being handled by a human from the ground.
registration papers, registration certificate, papers, pedigree papers
Documentation provided by a breed registry that verifies the breeding and ownership of an animal. Usually includes a pedigree chart and an outline illustration indicating white markings. Some organizations may include a photograph of the animal.
rein
Item of horse tack, attached as a pair to each side of a bit in the horse's mouth, used to direct or guide a horse for riding or driving.
ridgling, rig
A male horse with one or more undescended testicles (a cryptorchid), or one which is incompletely castrated (deliberately or accidentally). If both testicles are not descended, the horse may appear to be a gelding, but will still behave like a stallion.
ring sour (US)
A horse that exhibits competition burnout through undesired behavioral problems, including a disinterest in work, reluctance to move forward, pinned back ears, a twisting or wringing tail, or overall disobedience in the ring.
rising [to the trot]
Another term for posting.
roller
See surcingle.
roundup
The gathering of horses or other livestock in the American West. See also muster and drift.
rug (UK, Australasia)
See horse blanket.

== S ==
saddle
1. A device placed on the back of a horse or other equine, where the rider sits, designed to support and stabilize a rider. Comes in two main varieties, a stock saddle (western or Australian designs), and flatter types, known as the English saddle in the United States, which are used for jumping, dressage and racing.
2. A part of a driving harness placed on the back, forming an attachment point for several other harness parts, taking the weight of the shafts or pole.
saddle blanket, saddle pad (US)
1. Padding placed between the saddle and a horse's back. Sometimes used only to keep a saddle clean from horse sweat.
2. In western riding: a saddle blanket is a rectangular wool, felt or synthetic blanket placed under a western saddle; a saddle pad provides more padding than a blanket and is often a rectangle of fleece-covered foam.
3. In English riding: A saddle pad is placed under the saddle and may be shaped fully or partially to complement the outline of the saddle. Not all English saddles require padding. See also numnah.
saddle seat
1. A form of English riding popularized in the United States for riding gaited horses and other breeds where high, flashy, action is encouraged, notably the American Saddlebred, Morgan horse, and Arabian.
2. The style of saddle used for this discipline, also known as a park saddle, lane fox, or cutback. Is designed to set the rider farther back on the horse. Not intended for jumping.
sand roll
A loose box or yard covered with deep sand, which is used by horses to roll in after exercise.
semi-feral
Domesticated horses or ponies allowed to roam freely, but owned by individuals and rounded up from time to time. Examples include New Forest, Dartmoor and Exmoor ponies in their native locations, stock horses on many ranches in the American west, and some modern Iberian horses in Spain and Portugal. Herds often consist only of mares (with or without suckling foals), but stallions may be turned out in the mating season, with weanlings (especially colts) removed for sale in the autumn. The term may also refer to "bachelor herds" of young colts or geldings that are not old enough to be placed under saddle, or retired geldings too old to ride. See feral horse.
shafts
A pair of rigid bars extending from the front of a horse-drawn vehicle, attached to each side of a single horse. Allows the animal to steer the vehicle, and in the case of a two-wheeled vehicle, to hold it level. Used for a single animal, for the rearmost of several animals in tandem, or sometimes to act as poles between three horses abreast (a troika). Compare pole.
show
1. Short for horse show.
2. In US horse racing, the horse that comes in third place in a race. Also a bet that a horse will finish third or better.
show jumping
Also called stadium jumping; a competition that goes as high as the Olympic level, where the horse is judged on the number of obstacles it clears on the course in a given round and the speed at which it completes the course. When a course is not timed, or in the event of a tie, the height of obstacles is raised in each successive round, most notably in puissance competition, until there is a winner.
shying
When a horse jumps in fright, usually at a sudden movement or an unfamiliar object.
side reins
Auxiliary reins used for training or longeing. The reins run from the bit to a surcingle, girth, or saddle. Used to modify head carriage or encourage a young horse to have contact with a bit.
sidesaddle
A saddle designed for women where both legs are on the near side of the horse, rather than sitting with legs astride.
sire
The father of a horse.
sire line
A sire line is the term given to the bloodlines and male descendants from a single stallion and are commonly discussed within the racehorse industry. Sire line descent charts or trees are visual representations of the male descendant line, including showing branches of any other important sire lines of their descendants. Term is related to tail-male.
smooth mouth
Older horses who have worn the indentations or "cups" from their incisors, which usually occurs by about the age of eight. See also Horse teeth.

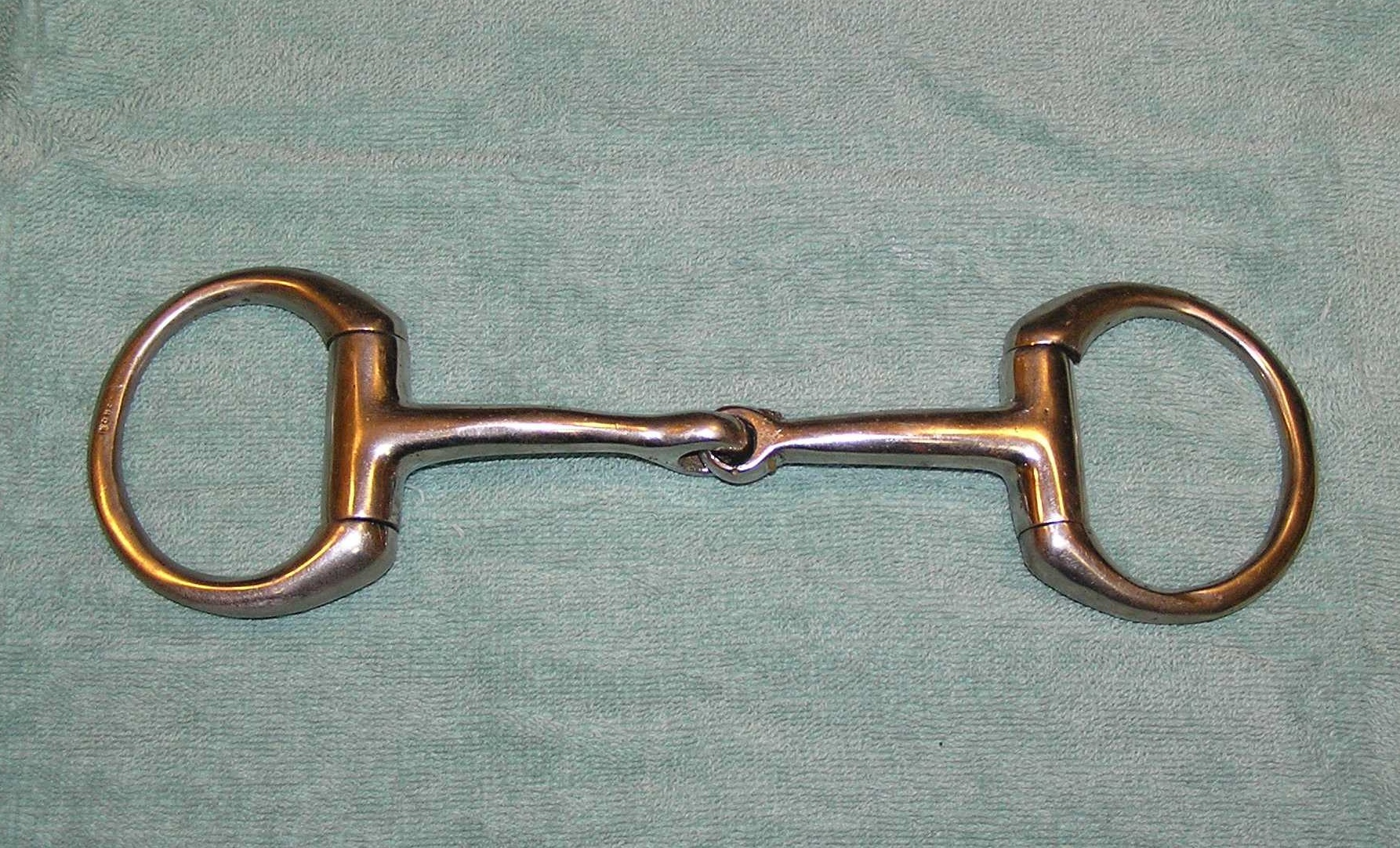
A snaffle bit with a jointed mouthpiece and "eggbutt" style bit rings

snaffle bit
A type of bit that applies direct pressure to the horse's mouth, i.e. a bit without leverage. Generally considered the mildest type of pressure, though severity can vary depending on the type of bit mouthpiece used. The most common style of snaffle bit has a jointed mouthpiece, but the term refers to a direct pressure bit with any type of mouthpiece, solid or jointed. Term sometimes is incorrectly used to refer to a curb bit with a jointed mouthpiece.
snort
A loud, sharp sound emitted when a horse holds its head high and forces the breath violently through the nostrils with the mouth shut. The snort lasts about one second..
sound
Technical terminology used to describe a healthy horse.
sour
A horse that exhibits unpleasant, sulky behavior when being worked. Usually correlated to overtraining or overwork. See also ring sour
splint
1. Ossification of the second and fourth metacarpal or metatarsal bones, which often form after trauma to the area. Often an unsoundness when newly injured, may ossify into blemishes with no effect on soundness, depending on location.
2. Splint bones, the second and fourth metacarpal or metatarsal bones, thought to be vestiges of the toes possessed by prehistoric equines.
sport horse
General term for a type of horse bred or trained for use in the international and Olympic equestrian disciplines of eventing, dressage, show jumping. In some cases may also include hunters and horses used in combined driving.
stable
1. A building in which horses are kept (also sometimes other livestock).
2. In UK usage, the enclosed space for a single horse within a larger building. See also stall.
3. A group of horses owned by one individual or group.
stable hand (US), stable lad/lass (UK)
A person employed to look after horses in a stable. ("Lad" and "lass" in this context do not imply youth). May include skilled horse grooms as well as people who clean stalls and perform other semi-skilled labor.
stable vice
Any of a number of repetitive or nervous behaviors seen most often in horses kept in confinement. Usually attributed to boredom and insufficient exercise, though temperament may also play a role. Stable vices include cribbing, weaving, wood chewing, wall-kicking and similar behaviors.
stagecoach
A large coach pulled by horses used in former times as public transport. A team of four or more horses would be used, being changed at regular intervals–"stages"–for a fresh team.
stall (US), stable (UK)
An enclosure within a stable in which an individual horse is kept. Can mean a loose box where the horse is loose and can turn around, and tie stall where the horse is tied facing in one direction.
stallion
A mature, uncastrated male horse, usually four years old and older, although sometimes refers to a horse three years of age or older. Other terms include entire, stud, stud horse, full, full horse, stone horse, stock horse, or bull. Compare colt, gelding.
stirrup
Paired small light frames or rings for receiving the foot of a rider, attached to the saddle by a strap, called a stirrup leather. Used to aid in mounting and as a support while riding. In UK usage and for English riding in some US regions, the term "stirrup" includes both the metal frame, or iron, and the stirrup leather, the strap used to suspend the iron from the saddle. In western riding, the term "stirrup" refers only to the frame, which on a western saddle is often made of wood covered with leather. See also irons.
stock horse
1. A horse used to herd and manage livestock on a ranch or station.
2. Generic term encompassing the horse breeds found in the American west that were developed for handling cattle.
3. The Australian Stock Horse, a specific horse breed.
4. Any horse used for various competitions that are based and judged on cattle handling or agility skills such as reining, cutting, campdrafting or similar events.
stock saddle
1. Several designs of a heavier style of saddle with a deep, secure seat, usually with flared pommels and a high cantle. Designed to help keep the rider seated when a horse makes rapid turns or stops, such as when working livestock.
2. An Australian stock saddle seen more often in the Southern Hemisphere.
3. A western saddle, seen more often in the United States.
stride
The distance from the imprint of a forefoot until the same foot hits the ground again.
string
The group of race horses being trained by an individual horse trainer. Sometimes used to refer to any group of horses trained or used by a single entity for a particular purpose, such as a string of polo ponies, a "show string" of horse show entries, or a pack string.
stringhalt
A nervous disorder in horses, causing a jerking movement, a higher-than-natural gait, of one or both hind legs, as if stepping over an invisible object.
stud
1. An establishment where pedigreed horses are bred.
2. At stud, a stallion being kept for breeding.
3. (US) Informal and technically incorrect term for a stallion.
stud book
1. (Also breed registry) a list of horses of a particular breed whose parents are known. An open stud book allows parents of different breeds, as long as the horse conforms to the breed standard or meets other criteria, and is often used when establishing new breeds. A closed stud book requires both parents to be in the book, with lineage traceable to the foundation bloodstock. The Thoroughbred breed is an example of a closed stud book. Many warmblood breeds such as the Oldenburger have an open stud book with animals approved for registry via a studbook selection process.
2. A list of stallions of a particular breed "standing at stud", that is, actively being bred.
3. (UK) Another term for the General Stud Book, the stud book for Thoroughbreds in the United Kingdom and Ireland.
substance
Assessment of the overall muscularity of a horse, width and depth of body and quality of bone.
suckling
A young foal that is nursing, not yet weaned from its mother.
sulky
A lightweight, two-wheeled cart for one person pulled by a single horse (or sometimes a pair). In earlier times used as a fast, showy form of transport, but now usually limited to harness racing, when it is often made extremely lightly, with bicycle-style wheels.
surcingle
1. Surcingle (NAm, UK/Ir), roller (UK/Ir, Au/NZ). A piece of training equipment which goes around the barrel of the horse. Usually padded at the top, and buckles around the horse. Often has rings placed at various locations for attachment of reins, a crupper and/or an overcheck. Specialized designs also used in equestrian vaulting.
2. A long unpadded strap that passes around the barrel of a horse. One design is placed over a saddle and is fastened with a buckle, used on racing, polo and Australian stock saddles. Other designs are used to hold on certain styles of horse blankets.

== T ==
tack
All the equipment that horses wear, such as saddles, bridles, harnesses, halters, and other horse care equipment.
tack room
A store where tack is kept.
tail-female, mare line, dam line, bottom line
The single line of mares, from the dam to maternal granddam, maternal great-granddam and so on. Usually shown on the bottom side of a pedigree chart. Corresponds in biology to mtDNA.
tail-male
The line of direct ancestral sires in a pedigree. Paternal line; relates to Y chromosome inheritance. Term is related to sire line.

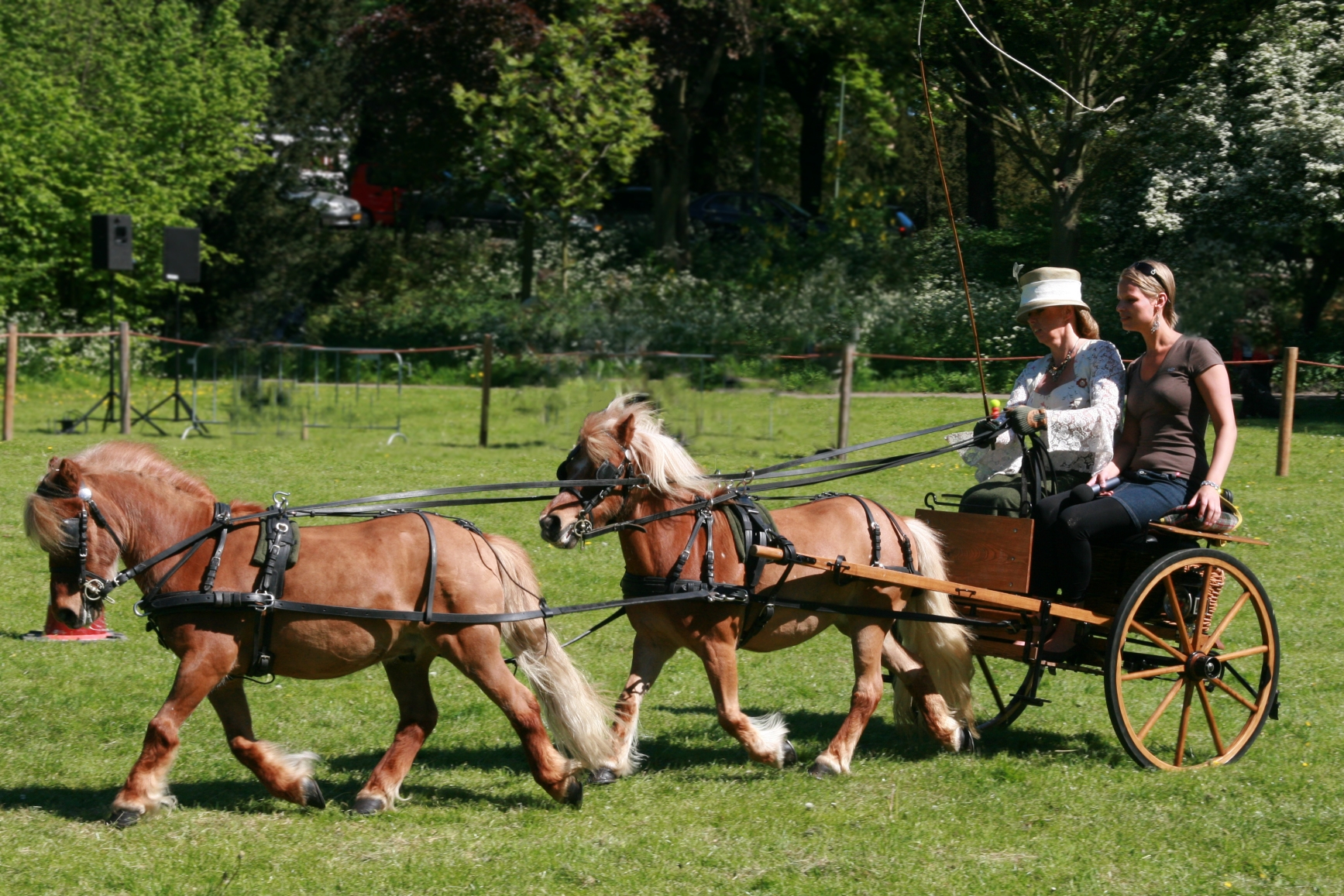
Ponies in a tandem hitch

tandem
A harnessing arrangement with two or more animals in single file, the rearmost (the wheeler) in shafts.
team
Several animals pulling a vehicle. Arranged in various configurations, most commonly as a pair (two side by side), in tandem (two or more in single file), a four (two pairs) or a six. More rarely other arrangements such as three or more abreast, a troika (three abreast with shafts between), a "pickax" (three abreast with a pair of wheelers behind) or a "unicorn" (a single animal in front of a pair of wheelers).
teamster
Old term for person who drove a team of horses, usually for freight.
Thoroughbred
When used as a proper noun, refers to a specific breed of horse, best known as a race horse. Occasionally used as a non-proper noun to mean purebred.
three-quarter brother/sister
Horses who share one sire, and the same maternal grandsire (damsire); in other words, horses that share three grandparents.
tie stall (US), stall (UK)
A small, rectangular enclosure within a stable, approximately 6 feet (1.8 m) wide by 8 to 10 feet (2.4 to 3.0 m) long, where an animal is kept tied up. See also stall.
topline
1. The area on a horse that runs from the poll to the dock.
2. On a pedigree chart, the paternal side of the ancestry, which is given on the top of the chart.
transition
The change from one gait to another.
trap, pony trap
A light two-wheeled vehicle.
tree
The underlying solid structure or frame of a saddle, which is covered with leather.
troika
1. A traditional Russian driving combination of three horses abreast pulling a sleigh.
2. Slang for any three-horse team harnessed abreast.
trot
A diagonal, two-beat, intermediate-speed gait.
trotting race
Another term for harness race.
twitch
A tool used to restrain and calm a horse by twisting a cord or chain around its upper lip.
typey
Slang for a horse that conforms to its breed standards, or type.

== U ==
unshod

unsound
A horse with significant lameness or other health problems.

== V ==
veterinarian

Doctor of veterinary medicine, an individual who is trained to provide medical care to horses and other animals. Specialists who work with horses are known as equine veterinarians. Professional acronyms: DVM, VMD, MRCVS.
vice
A habit making the horse difficult to work or keep, such as biting, kicking or bucking. Includes (but is not limited to) stable vices.

== W ==
wagon, waggon (UK)
A four-wheeled vehicle pulled by one or more horses. Usually used for carrying loads.
walk
A four-beat gait, the slowest of the natural horse gaits.
warmblood
A descriptive word for many middle-weight horse types and breeds, most originally developed in Europe by the crossbreeding of draft or heavy harness horses to light horse breeds such as Thoroughbreds or Arabians. "Warm" refers to its origin as a cross of a cold-blood, and a hot-blood—it does not relate to body temperature.
weanling
A foal that has been weaned from its mother, but is less than one year old.
weave, weaving (US)
A habit, considered a stable vice, developed by some horses kept for long periods in a stall, in which the horse repetitively sways side to side, shifting weight and moving its head and neck back and forth. See also boxwalking.
western riding
1. A style of riding characterized by use of a western saddle and a bridle without a noseband.
2. Western riding (horse show): A competition seen as some horse shows where a horse in western equipment is required to perform a pattern that incorporates elements of reining, trail and western pleasure.

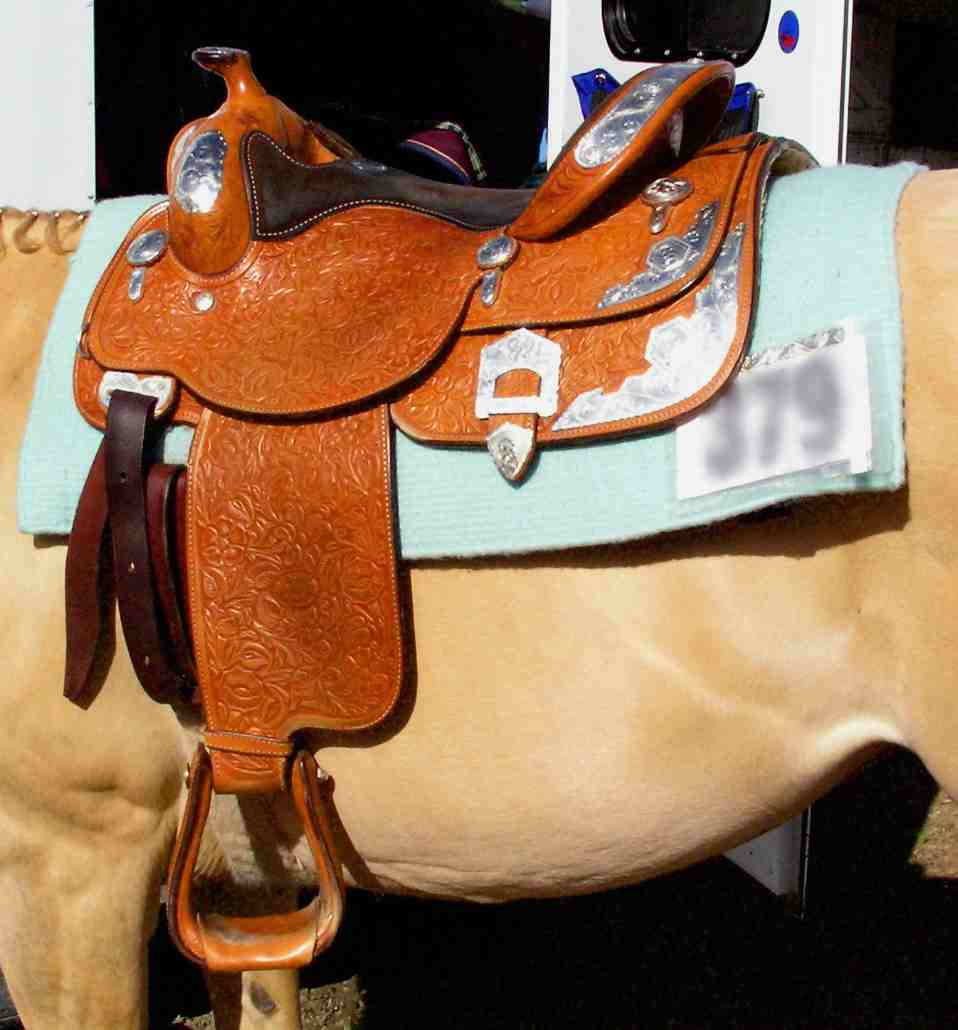
A western saddle

western saddle
Style of saddle used for western riding. See also stock saddle.
wheeler
One of the pair of horses closest to a horse-drawn vehicle (next to the wheels). The only horses in a team able to slow the vehicle, by pulling back on the pole. Also the rearmost of a team in tandem. See leader.
whicker
See nicker.
whinny or whinney
See neigh.
whorl
A spiral arrangement of hairs, usually on a horse's neck. Their location is one means of horse identification.
wild horse
Horses with no domesticated ancestors. Currently the only wild horse in the world is the Przewalski's horse. All other free-roaming horses today are [[#feral horse|feral horse]]s, descended from domesticated ancestors, though technically, the modern domestic horse, Equus ferus caballus, is a subspecies of Equus ferus the ancestral wild horse.
win
In horse racing, the horse that comes in first in a given race. Also a bet that a horse will come in first.

== X ==
Xenophon
Ancient Greek cavalry officer, historian and political philosopher who wrote a manual, On Horsemanship (Ἱππαρχικὸς ἢ περὶ ἱππικῆς) describing humane methods for the training of horses, circa 350 BC. Sometimes called the "father of classical horsemanship".

== Y ==
yearling
A horse that is between 12 and 24 months of age.
yellow horse
Slang for a palomino in the Western US.

== Z ==
zebroid or zebra mule
Hybrid offspring of a zebra crossed on another equine, term includes the zorse, zony and zedonk.

== See also ==
For additional terminology, see also:

- Glossary of carriage and driving terminology
- Equine anatomy (includes definitions and illustration of the points of a horse)
- Equine coat color (lists all coat colors)
- Equine conformation (includes terms that describe conformation flaws)
- Horse breeding (explains relevant concepts)
- List of horse breeds (includes horse breeds and types)
- Horse racing:
  - Glossary of Australian and New Zealand punting
  - Glossary of North American horse racing
- Equipment:
  - Bridle (includes a list of bridle parts)
  - Horse tack (horse equipment)
  - Horse harness (includes a list of harness parts)
  - Horse grooming (includes list of tools)
  - Saddle (includes a list of saddle parts)
