= Plug Plug =

Peruvian band

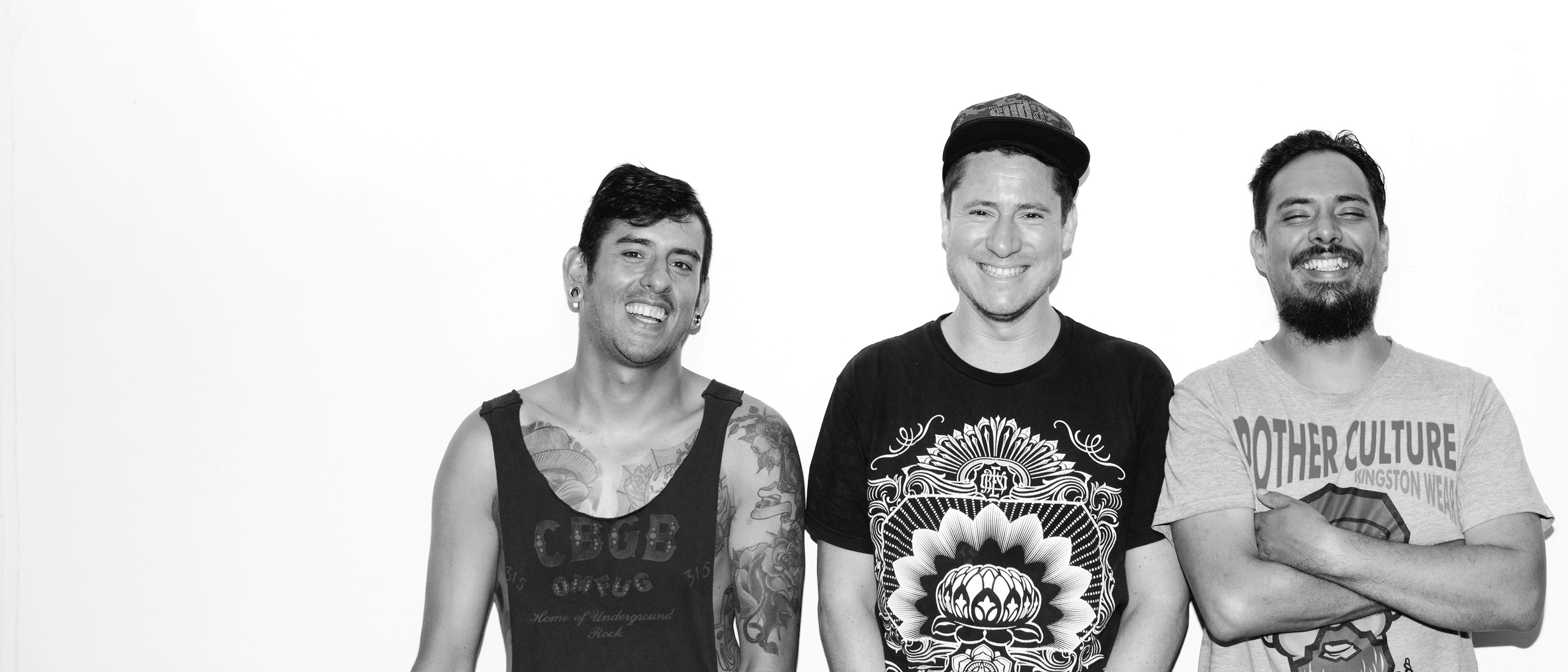

Background information
- Origin: Lima, Peru
- Genres: Indie rock, post-punk, math rock, post hardcore, música peruana
- Years active: 2007–present
- Label: equinodermo
- Members: Garzo; Camilo Riveros; Sandro Labenita
- Website: losplugplug.com

Plug Plug, is an eclectic band, based on genres such as post punk, post hardcore and Peruvian music, formed in Lima, Peru.

== History ==
It was formed in 2007 by Garzo (Singer and guitar), Sandro Labenita (drums) and Camilo Riveros (Bass) all three of them members of well-known bands in their musical circuit. The band progressed as they released albums during 2008 and 2010 as well as several performances during this period. They entered into a difficult phase by the end of 2010, after their lead singer, Garzo, went to live abroad, right after the Internet release of their third album Moo Mua Moo Cow Crazy Love which was well received by the international press but generated uncertainty among their fan base, leading to little news of their upcoming album and rare and occasional live performances during the following years. In January, 2014, they surprised the Peruvian press, announcing the physical release of their third album, Moo Mua Moo Cow Crazy Love and an upcoming fourth album by the end 2014.

== Musical style ==
Plug Plug has been compared to Modest Mouse, Fugazi and their preview band members' projects.

== Discography ==
- Trinitron (album) (2008)
- Equinomoda para las Aves que dejaron el Nido (album) (2009)
- Moo Mua Moo Cow Crazy Love (album) (2010)
- Humanicomio Terraqueo (album) (2020)
