= Feedbag =

Container for horse fodder

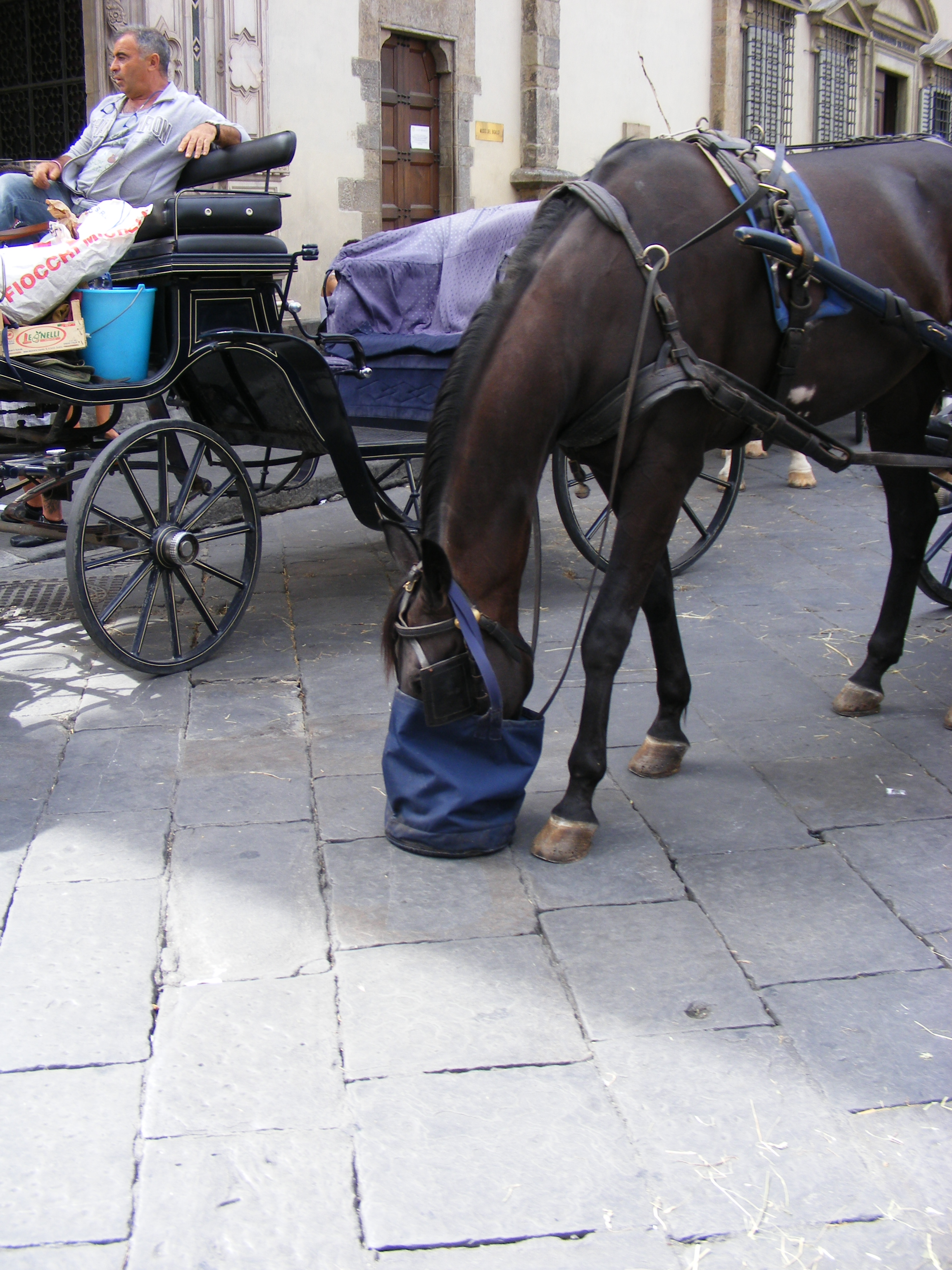
A horse eating from a feedbag in Florence, Italy

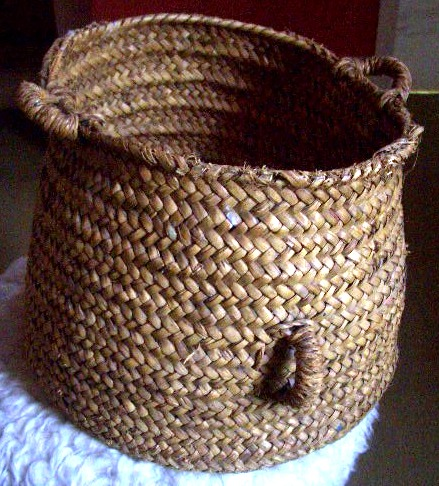
An early 1930s horse's nose bag, made of reeds, from the island of Ibiza in the Mediterranean. Dimensions: height 26 cm; base diameter 36 cm; top diameter 28 cm.

A feedbag, feed bag, feeding bag, nosebag, or morral, is a bag, filled with fodder, and attached to the head of a horse, enabling it to eat. The main advantages are that only a small amount of the feed is wasted, and it prevents one animal consuming the ration of another.

It can be made of leather, reeds, but more commonly is a thick fabric or light canvas. Some modern designs are made of Cordura or other durable nylon, with a solid bottom and mesh sides for ventilation.

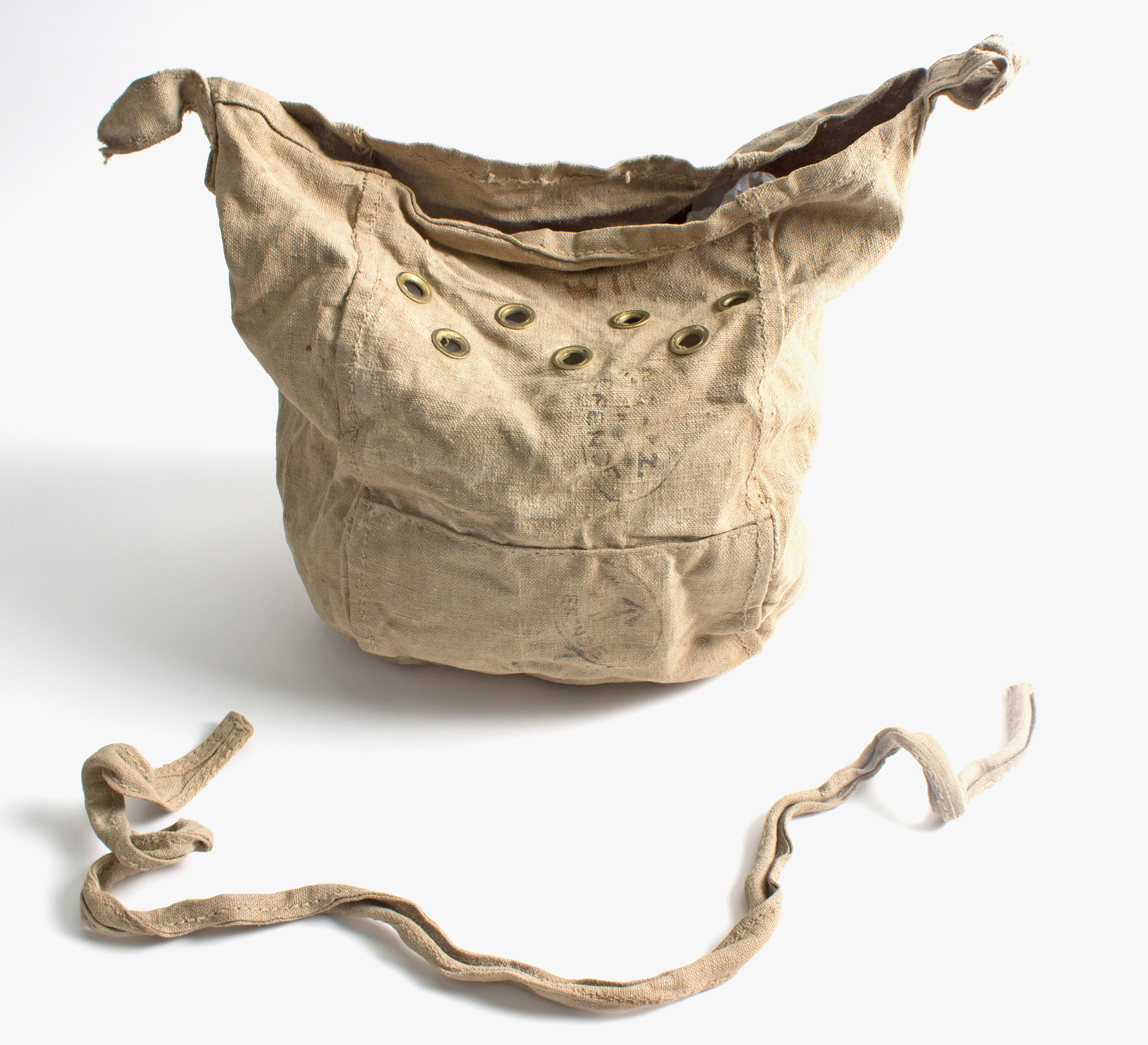
World War One New Zealand army-issued feedbag

To access the portion of the feed near the bottom of the bag, the horse needs to be able to touch its head to the ground, allowing it to push its nose into the end of the bag.

In popular US culture, the feedbag is used in the expression "strap on the old feedbag", meaning to "dine". It suggests that the diner will pay little attention to etiquette, and will dine heartily. The term is also found in numerous restaurant names.

== See also ==
- Glossary of equestrian terms
