= Addon =

Addon (Hebrew: אַדּוֹן, etymology unknown) was one of the persons named in the Neh. 7:61 who could not "shew their father's house" on the return from captivity. This, with similar instances (ver. 63), indicates the importance the Jews attached to their genealogies.
