= Vladimir Plugin =

- Владимир Александрович Плугин
- Born: 30 July 1937; Gus-Khrustalny, Russian Soviet Federative Socialist Republic
- Died: 12 June 2003 (aged 65); Moscow
- Education: Moscow State University
- Occupations: historian, art historian
- Employer: Moscow State University

Vladimir Alexandrovich Plugin (Russian: Владимир Александрович Плугин; 30 July 1937 – 6 December 2003) was a Russian historian, art historian and university professor. He worked in the fields of the history of Russia, source criticism, art history, social and political history, war history, history of the army and navy. He specialized in Old Russian Chronicles, Russian icons (specifically Andrei Rublev's). He penned Rublev's biography titled The Master of the Holy Trinity: Andrei Rublev's Works and Days (Russian: Мастер Святой Троицы: Труды и дни Андрея Рублева).

Plugin studied at the Moscow State University and graduated from the Faculty of History, where he studied under Viktor Lazarev and Mikhail Belyavsky. He taught at the Moscow State University since 1968.

== Works ==
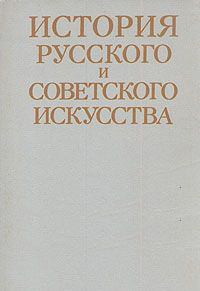
The cover of The History of Russian and Soviet Art, 1989.

- Eschatology as a Subject in the Old Church Slavonic Social Thought (Russian: Эсхатологическая тема в древнерусской общественной мысли), 1971
- The Worldview of Andrei Rublev (Russian: Мировоззрение Андрея Рублёва), 1974
- Sergius of Radonezh — Dmitry Donskoy — Andrei Rublev (Russian: Сергий Радонежский — Дмитрий Донской — Андрей Рублёв), 1989
- Alekhan, or a Person with a Scar: A Biography of Alexei Orlov-Chesmensky (Russian: Алехан, или Человек со шрамом: Жизнеописание графа Алексея Орлова-Чесменского), 1996
- The Master of the Holy Trinity: Andrei Rublev's Works and Days (Russian: Мастер Святой Троицы: Труды и дни Андрея Рублева), 2001
- The History of Russian and Soviet Art (Russian: История русского и советского искусства), 1989
