= Saddle blanket =

Blanket beneath the saddle to protect the horse's back

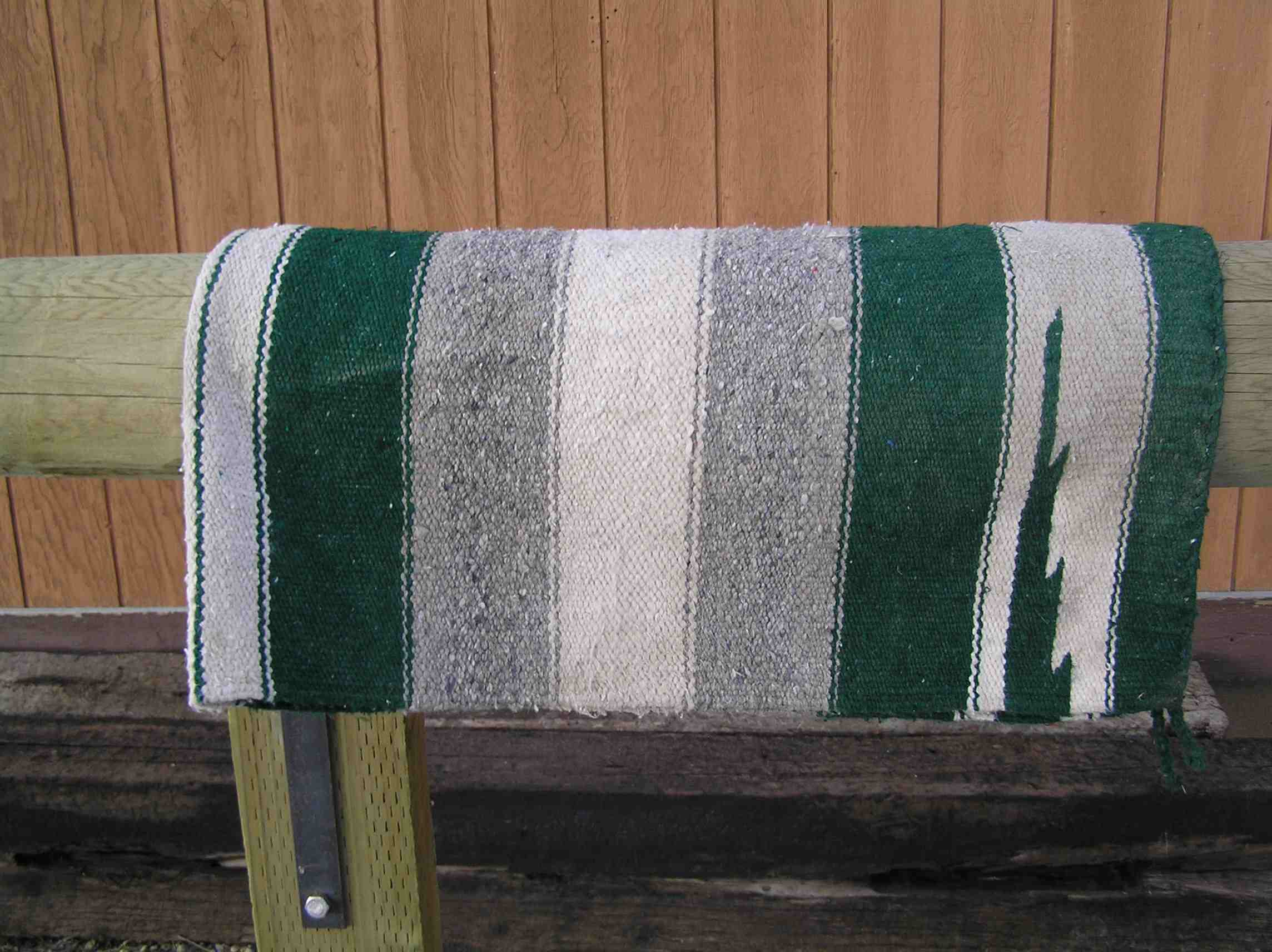
A traditionally styled western saddle blanket

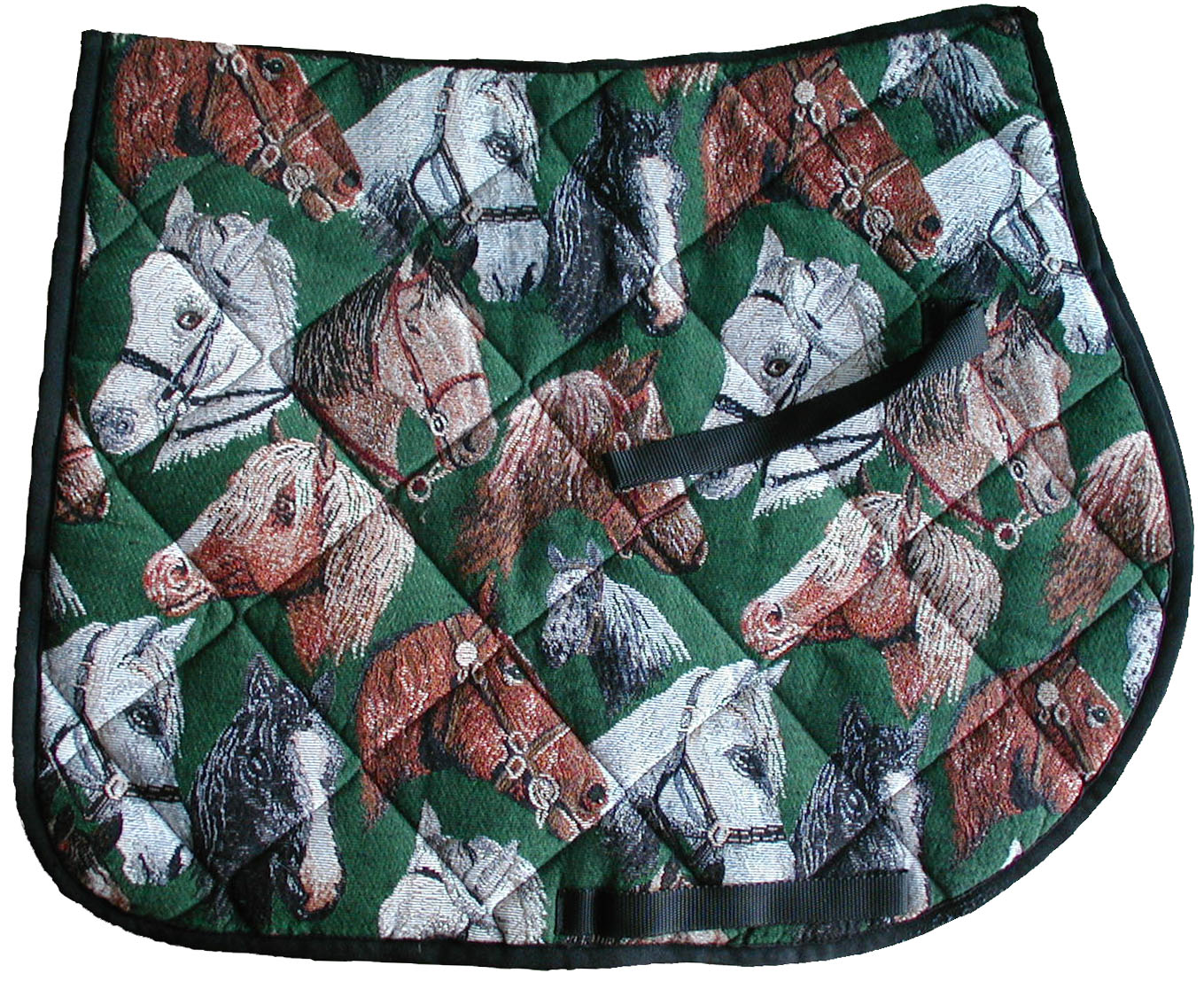
A modern saddle pad of a shabrack-type design

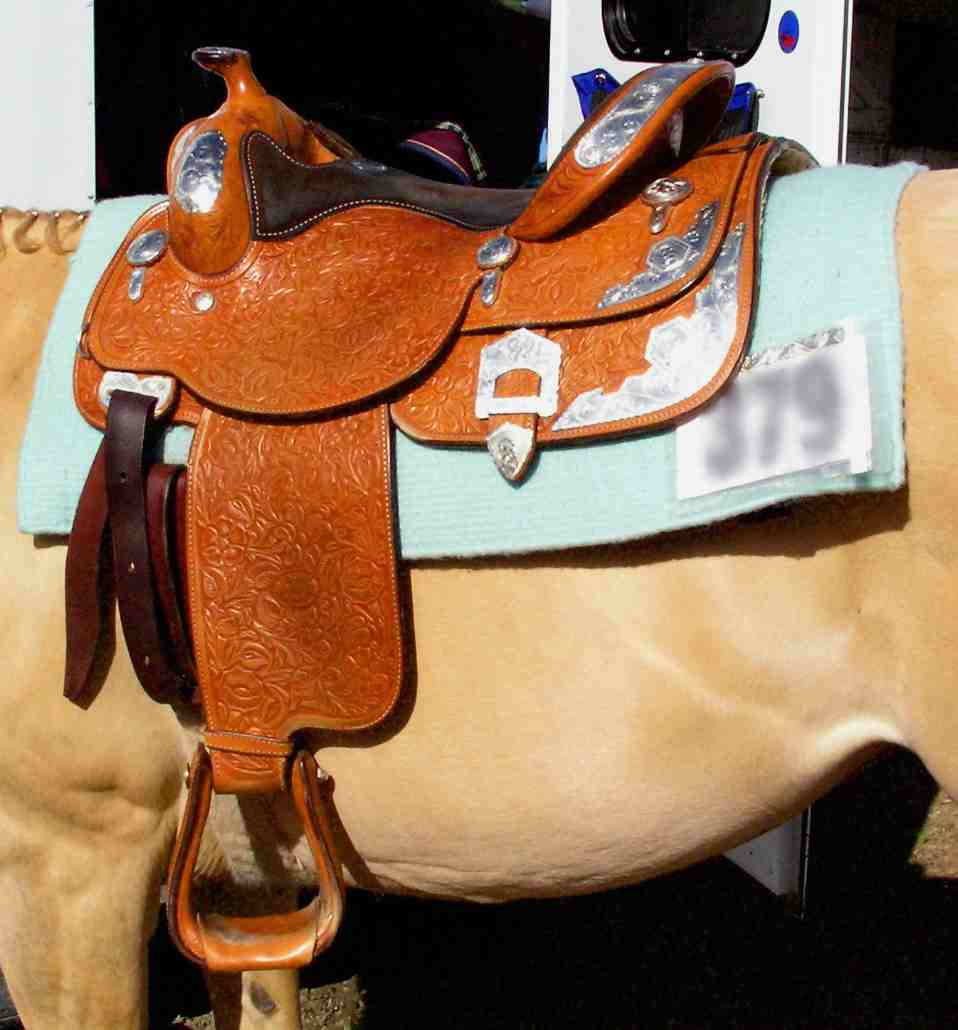
A western saddle placed over a saddle blanket.

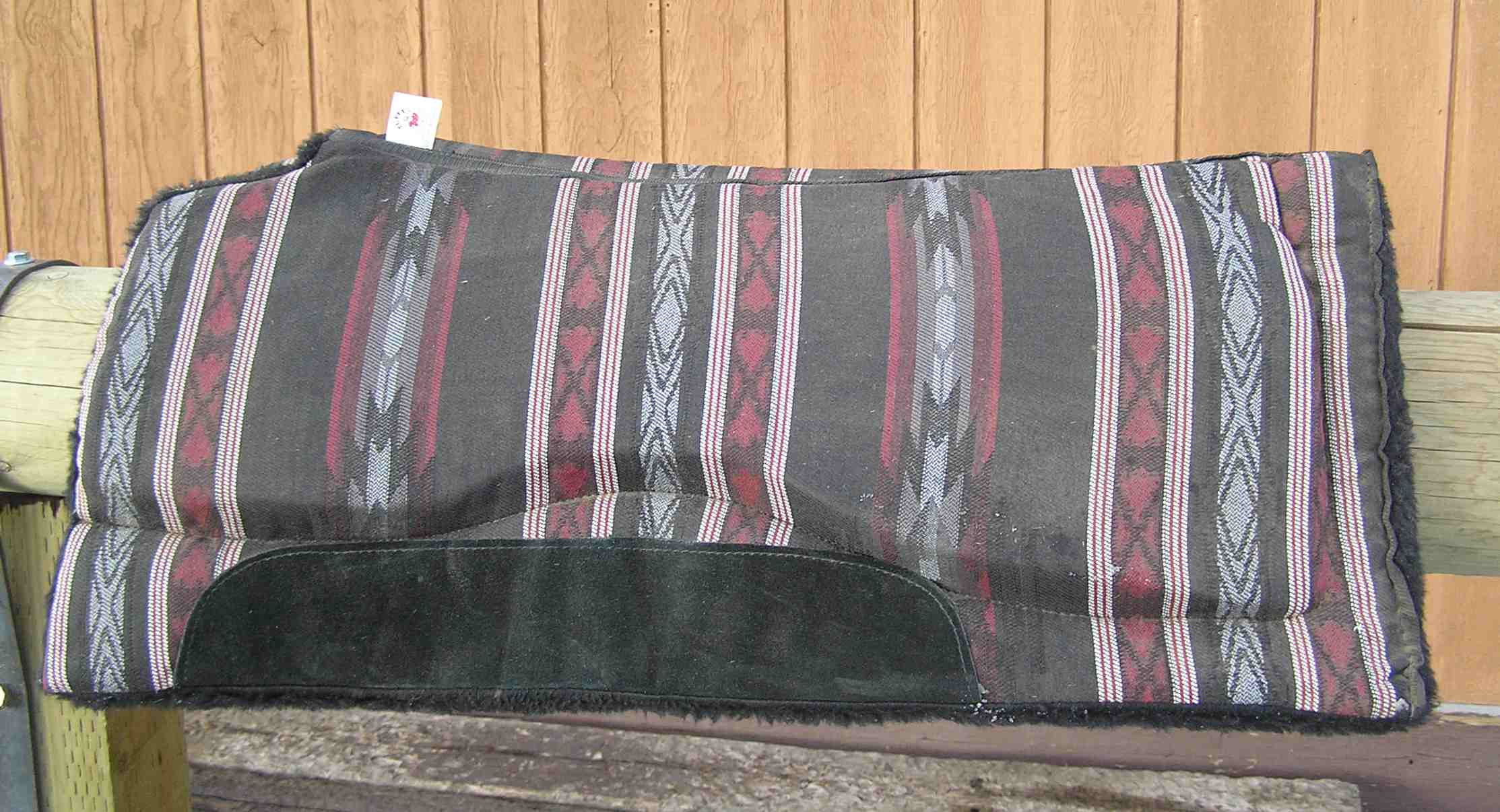
A modern western saddle pad, with blanket design on top, fleece underneath, and felt or foam padding on the inside

The terms saddle blanket, saddle pad (or numnah), and saddle cloth refer to blankets, pads or fabrics inserted under a saddle. These are usually used to absorb sweat, cushion the saddle, and protect the horse's back. There are lighter types of saddle cloth, such as the shabrack, used primarily for decorative purposes, often placed over the top of a more utilitarian pad.

Saddle blankets have been used for many centuries with all types of saddles. Some are a single thickness, others are made to be folded and used with a double thickness. Although a pad or blanket cannot take the place of a properly fitted saddle, pads with shims or blankets with a special design can partially compensate for minor fitting problems.

Half pads are small, contoured pads used for temporary saddle fit adjustments, such as compensating for muscle wastage or weight gain. They fill hollow gaps while a horse's shape is changing, but once the horse is correctly muscled, the saddle should be re-fitted and the pad removed. Some riders will use a half pad for extra cushioning, or to prevent the saddle from slipping.

The most blanket-like style is associated with the American-style western saddle. It is usually made of wool, cotton, or synthetic fabrics with similar characteristics. When fitted under the saddle, they are approximately 35 inches (0.89 m) square, although designs vary to fit horses of different sizes.

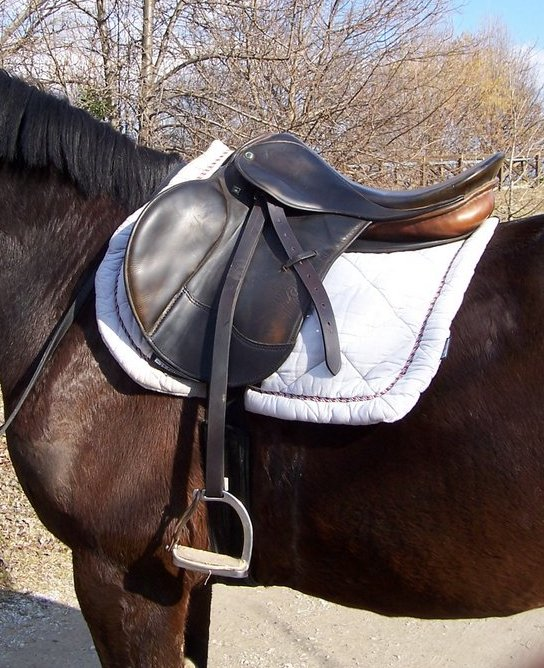
A modern style English square pad.

A saddle pad (US) or numnah (UK) is thicker, usually with layers of felt, foam or other modern material sandwiched between a tough outer cover on top and a soft cover on the side in contact with the horse. The best designs absorb shock and minimize fatigue for the horse's back muscles. Saddle pads of various styles or shapes are used with any type of saddle. Sheepskin numnahs that are shaped to fit around a saddle are popular in some disciplines.

The term "saddle cloth" has two meanings. In Australian English, a saddle cloth is usually a square pad worn under the saddle. In the United States, the term refers to a very thin, lightweight blanket placed over a pad or heavier blanket for purely decorative or identification purposes, such as the square cloths used under the saddles of race horses.

== Designs for stock saddles ==
Both blankets and pads are used with western saddles, the Australian Stock Saddle and other saddle designs with a solid tree that covers many square inches of a horse's back. The standard stock pad is square or slightly rectangular, and is designed to show under the saddle, providing both protection and style. These pads come in many colors and designs, and at horse shows may be color-coordinated to the rider's attire.

== Designs for English riding ==
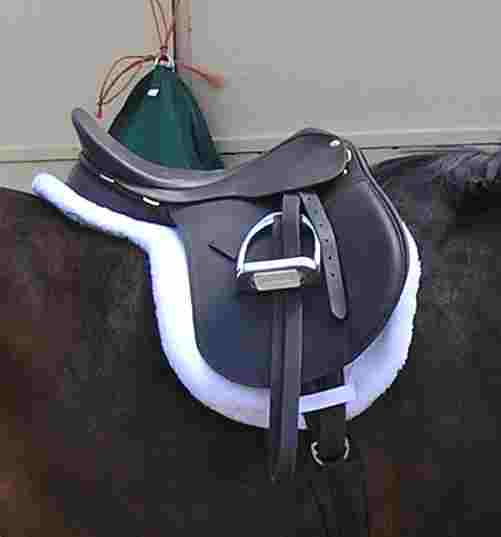
A traditional English saddle pad is cut to conform to the shape of the saddle.

English saddles typically use a shaped pad, called a "numnah" in British English. The original purpose of the English saddle pad was simply to protect the saddle from dirt and sweat, as the panels of the English saddle provided the necessary padding and protection for the horse. It was a simple pad, either a neutral shade designed to be nearly invisible under the saddle, or, more recently, white, and shaped to fit the outline of the saddle. Today, English style pads are also used to alter the balance of a saddle and to compensate for fit problems. In addition, square pads, called saddlecloths in the UK and Australia, have become a popular style for eventing, show jumping and dressage, in part because of the ability to add insignia to the corners. They are also popular with children and casual riders because they are available in a wide range of bright colors.

There are additional new types of English saddle pads such as the "riser" pad, which is thicker in the back than the front. Other pads are made with an opening to allow extra room for the withers of the horse, some are shaped to compensate for lordosis or swayback, and many modern "space age" materials are used, such as gel or memory foam to absorb shock, and modern synthetic materials with wicking properties to absorb moisture.

== Other designs ==
A hybrid design that is a cross between a saddle blanket and a horse blanket, called a quarter sheet, is a larger blanket placed under the saddle but which covers the horse from shoulder to hip while riding. Quarter sheets are sometimes used in cold weather to keep a horse's muscles loosened up when warming up for competition, or on horses that may have to stand around when under saddle and run the risk of stiffening up if their muscles get chilled.

== History ==
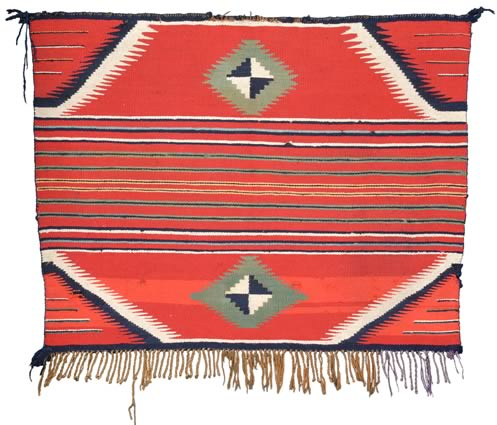
Navajo single saddle blanket, circa 1870

When the horse was first domesticated, the saddle blanket was the first and only piece of equipment placed on a horse's back, attached with a strap or rope, used primarily to protect the rider. Over time, the blanket developed into a pad, and later the pad or blanket became a buffer and support for a saddle.
