= Australian stock saddle =

Type of saddle

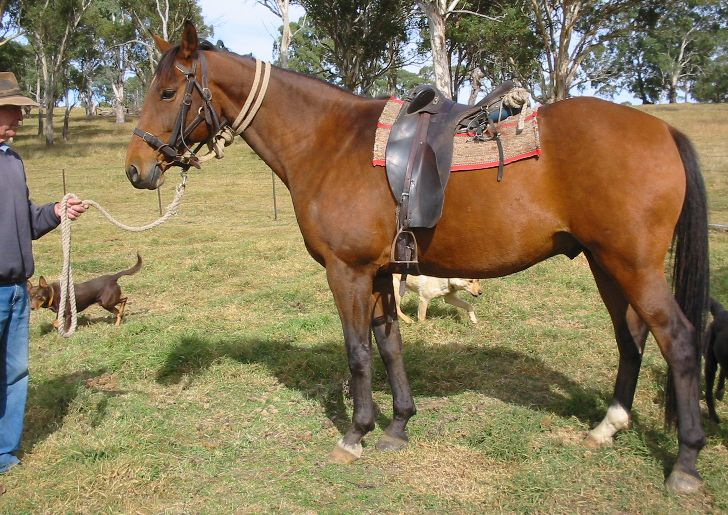
A horse wearing a traditional Australian stock saddle

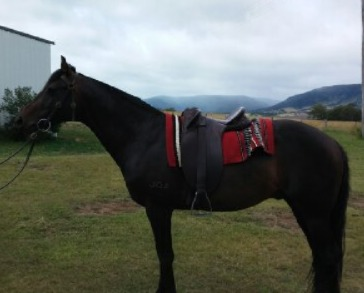
Australian Stock Saddle on Australian Stock Horse

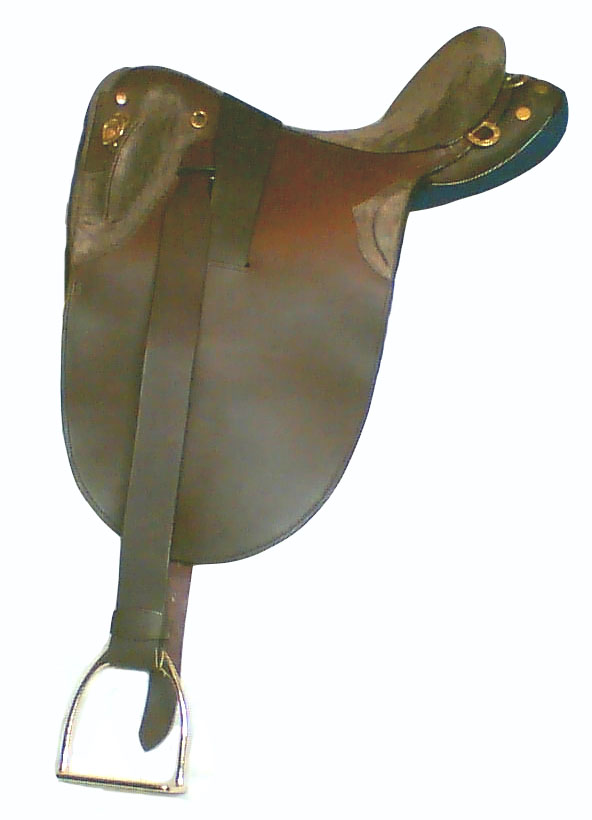
Traditional design Australian stock saddle

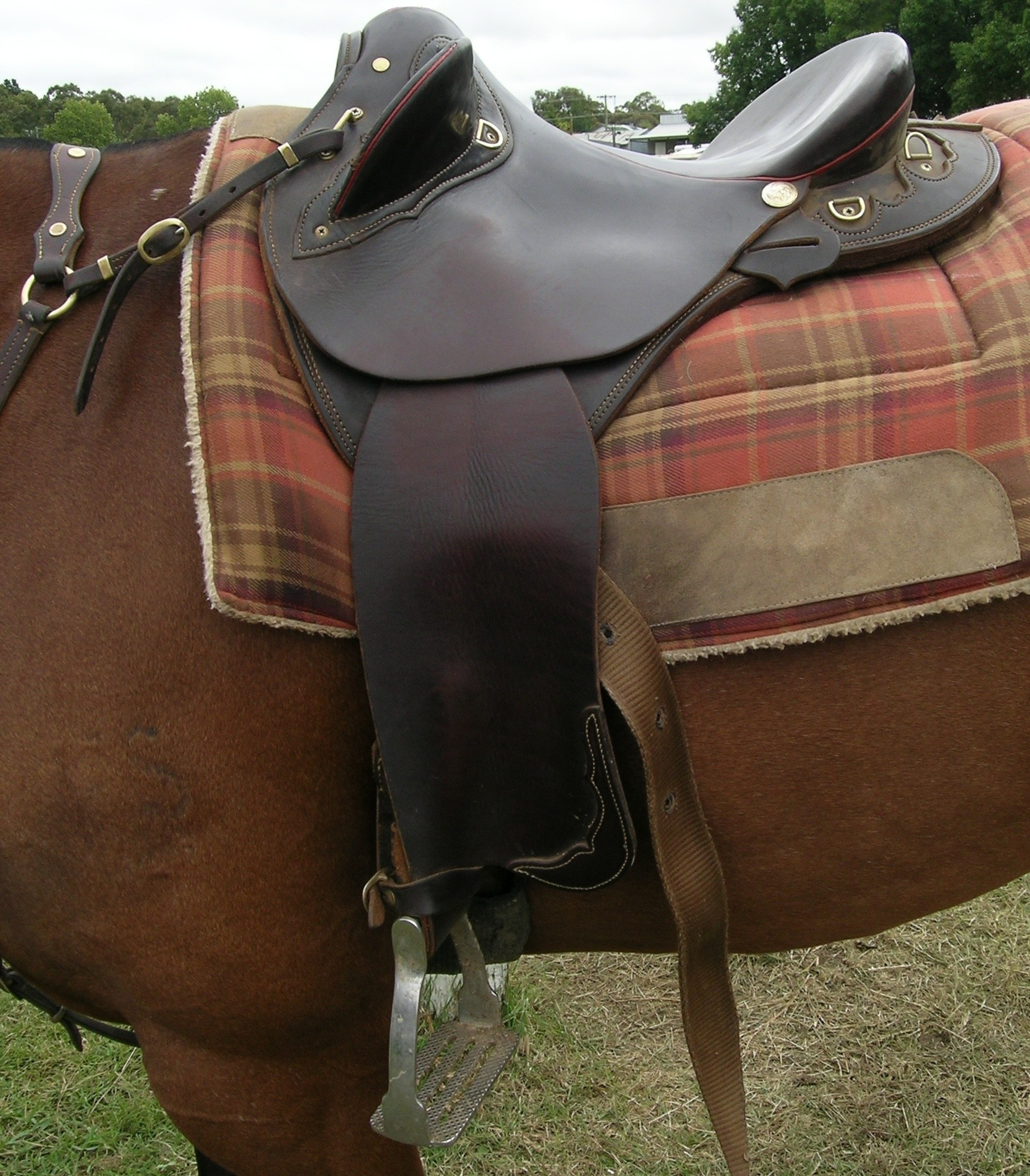
Half breed saddle with modern four bar irons

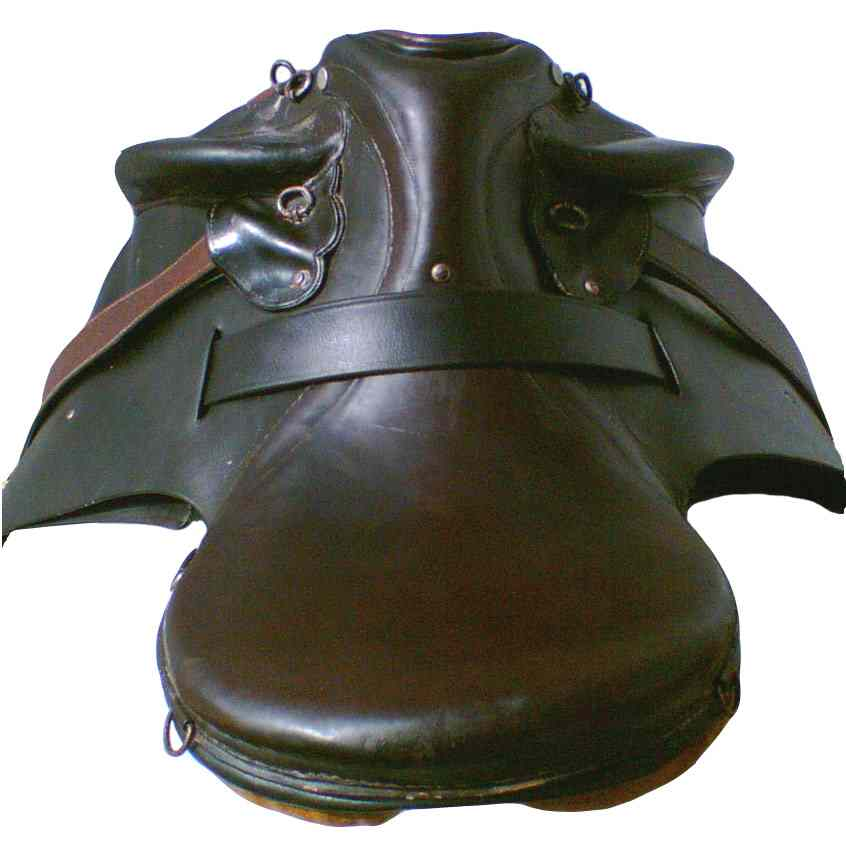
Top view

The Australian stock saddle is a saddle in popular use all over the world for activities that require long hours in the saddle and a secure seat. The saddle is suitable for cattle work, starting young horses, everyday pleasure riding, trail riding, endurance riding, polocrosse and is also used in Australian campdrafting competitions and stockman challenges.

The traditional Australian stock saddle was designed for security and comfort in the saddle no matter how harsh the conditions. While having stylistic roots from the English saddle in the design of the seat, panels, fenders, and stirrups, it has a much deeper seat, higher cantle, and knee pads in the front to create a very secure saddle for riders who ride in rough conditions or spend long hours on a horse.

The saddle is kept on with a girth attached to billets under the flaps, similar to those on a dressage saddle. A surcingle passing over the seat of the saddle is also used to provide additional safety. The rear of the saddle is sometimes secured by a crupper. A breastcollar is sometimes added. A saddle blanket or numnah is used under the saddle to absorb sweat and to protect the back of the horse.

== History ==
The stock saddle evolved from the "park" style saddle similar to the modern English showing saddle, with a flat seat and short flaps. However, this style of saddle did not suit the rugged Australian terrain and did little protect the rider’s legs from sweat. As early as 1833, only 45 years after the flag was raised in Australia, a saddler named John Jones was advertising English gentlemen's saddles along with Stock and Bush saddles for the colony. The difference being of the gentlemen's saddle and the stock saddle was that Jones was placing soft stuffed rolls sewn to the outside of the flap to prevent the lower leg getting injured through the rough bush of Australia while chasing cattle. It also gave the rider a sense of security rather than a straight small flap that was common in the English 'Park Saddle'. In c1863 William Mitchell Jnr., Wagga Wagga, developed a revolutionary design that had lifted the now more firmly packed knee pad up higher, and shortened the frying pan seat. This saddle became the 'must have' with stockmen of the day. It was reported that clients by-passed the Melbourne saddlers to secure a "Wagga Saddle" from Mitchell such was its popularity. A saddle maker named Jack Wieneke in 1898 was sought to ride a refractory horse. He had developed a design that was popular for a number of years, especially after he had ridden that particular outlaw to a standstill. The saddle design was called the Outlaws Master and was set to send Wieneke on a path of lifetime entrepreneurial saddlery skills that still have the public today, mentioning his name. His Outlaws Master, plus his many other designs with the 6" knee pads and 4" thigh pads over time became too extreme and lost favour to more conservative styles. The man who was considered to be the catalyst for the current popular design of today was Albert 'Bertie' Cox, Miriam Vale Queensland. In the 1920s he came up with the "broken neck" poley. This refers to the way the seat webbings were strained, creating a flatter seat and he raised the kneepads closer to the top of the pommel. This design made provision for the rider to sit more forward under the pads, allowing for better balance during fast cattle work, and also gave a better grip to the rider on a bucking horse.

During the early days of buckjumping in Australian rodeos, riders rode in a modified stock saddle using a crupper instead of the "flank cinch" used in the USA. Ladies' stock saddles were traditionally made with a pigskin seat and with longer, pigskin covered knee and thigh pads.

== Current design ==
Modern styles range from traditional models through to a newer "half breed" that incorporates the independent swinging fender and stirrup style of the western saddle with the traditional Australian tree and seat style. There are also "cross breed" saddles that combine other western saddle elements, such as a saddle horn or a western cantle design, with traditional Australian elements, such as the pommel swells and deep seat.

== Comparison with other styles ==
The Australian saddle combines some features of both English and Western saddles. The Australian saddle allows riders to be able to move with the horse over difficult terrain. The added “knee pads” help to keep the rider in the saddle, as do the high cantle and pommel. The stirrup position on the Australian saddle is a little more forward than in a western saddle and the seat positions the legs in front of the body. This makes the saddle comfortable for long hours of riding and for riding in tough terrain. One of the issues with the Australian stock saddle is the stirrup leathers, as the leathers lie on the outside of the flap and against the leg. If not wide enough, the leg can get pinched. Some new designs, such as the "swinging fender", that incorporates the western-style stirrup leather, have attempted to address this issue. Some saddles, particularly some designs sold in the United States also add a western-style saddle horn, though this is not a traditional element of the Australian saddle.
