= Center of balance (horse) =

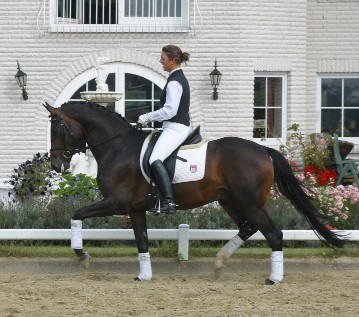
The upright position of the dressage rider is balanced over a highly collected horse

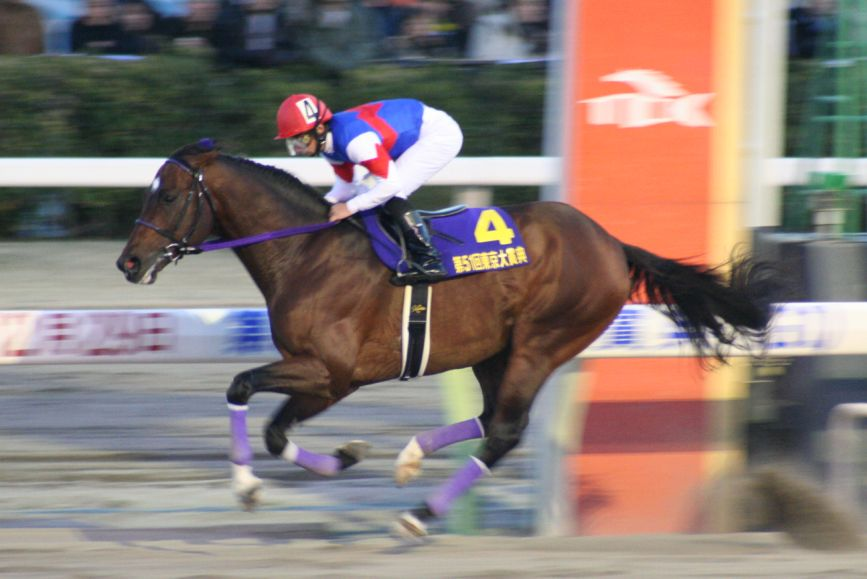
A forward position allows a race horse jockey to stay over the galloping horse's center of gravity so the horse can reach the maximum possible speed

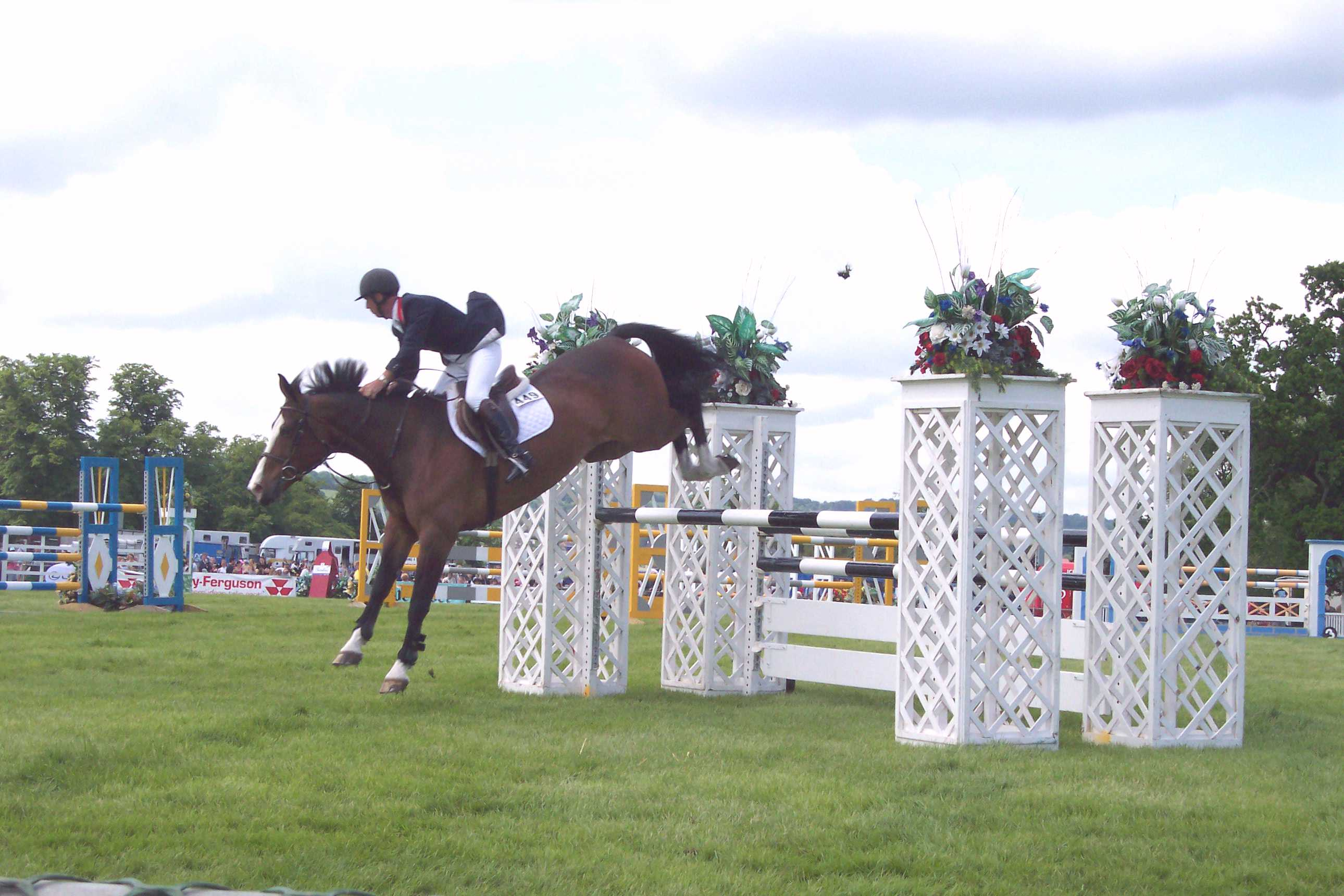
A show jumping rider has to stay balanced over a horse that is constantly changing position

In horsemanship, the center of balance of a horse is a position on the horse's back which correlates closely to the center of gravity of the horse itself. The term may also refer to the horse's center of gravity.

For the best performance by the horse, as well as for better balance, the rider must be positioned over the center of balance of the horse. The location of the horse's center of balance depends on a combination of speed and degree of collection. For a standing or quietly walking horse, it is slightly behind the heart girth and below the withers. If a horse is moving at a trot or canter, the center of balance shifts slightly forward, and it moves even more forward when the horse is galloping or jumping. If a horse is highly collected, the center of balance will be further back, regardless of gait, than if the horse is in an extended frame. For movements such as a rein back or the levade, the center of balance of the horse and rider may be further back than at a standstill, due to the shift of weight and balance to the hindquarters of the horse

Accordingly, a saddle designed for a specific discipline will attempt to place a rider naturally at the most suitable position for the anticipated activity of the horse. For example, a "close contact" style of English saddle, designed for show jumping, places the rider's seat further forward than does a dressage style English saddle.
