= English saddle =

Style of saddle

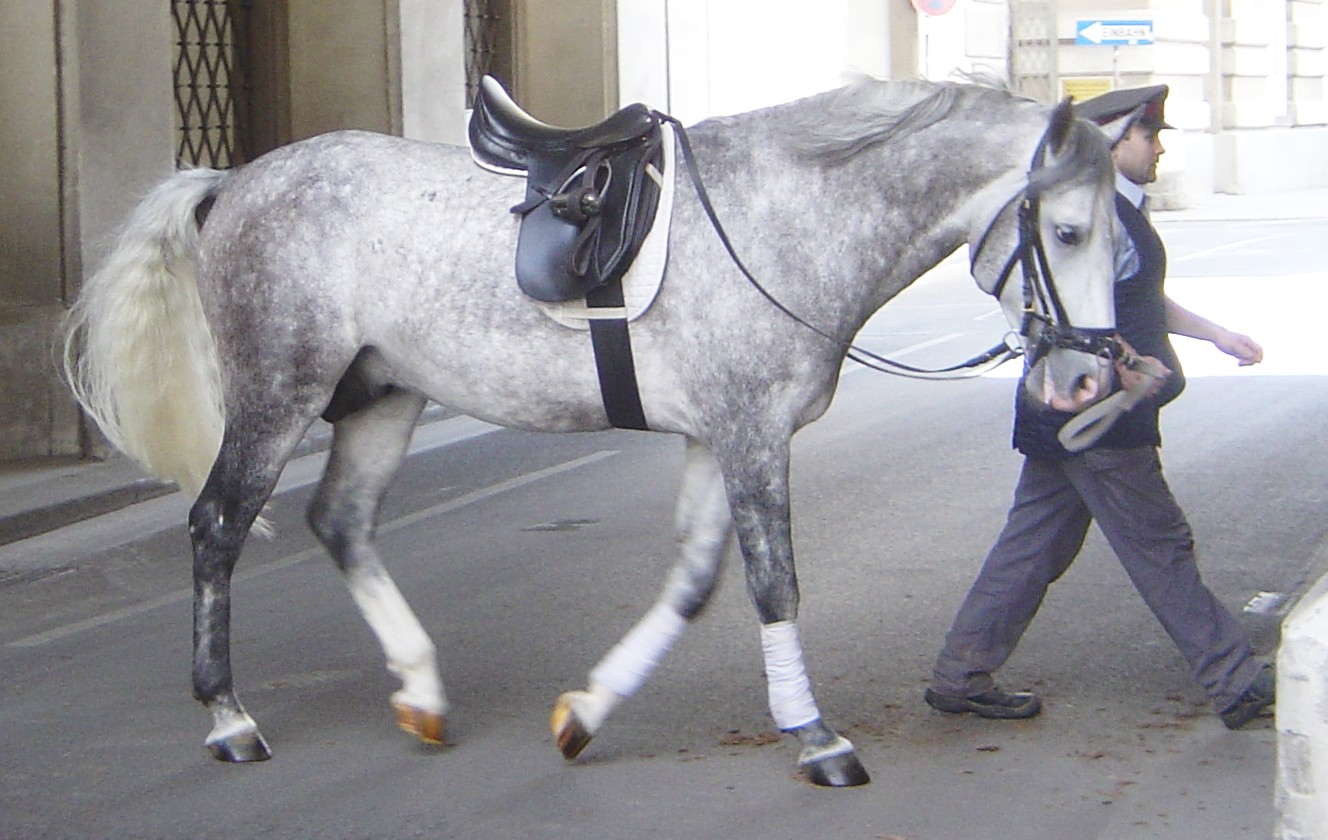
A Lipizzan horse wearing a type of English saddle known as a dressage saddle.

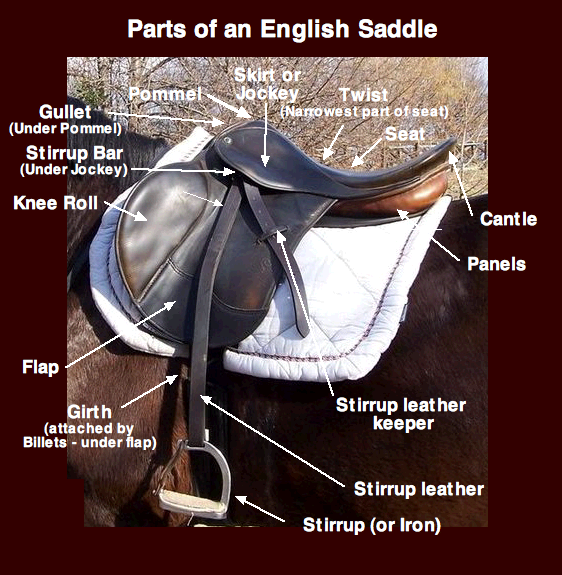
Parts of an English Saddle (All-Purpose style)

English saddles are saddles used to ride horses in English riding disciplines throughout the world. The discipline is not limited to England, the United Kingdom in general or other English-speaking countries. This style of saddle is used in all of the Olympic and International Federation for Equestrian Sports (FEI) equestrian disciplines, except for the newly approved FEI events of equestrian vaulting and reining. Most designs were specifically developed to allow the horse freedom of movement, whether jumping, running, or moving quickly across rugged, broken country with fences. Unlike the western saddle or Australian Stock Saddle, there is no horn or other design elements that stick out above the main tree of the saddle.

== Construction ==
The English saddle is based on a solid tree, over which webbing, leather and padding materials are added. Traditionally, the tree of an English saddle is built of laminated layers of high quality wood, reinforced with steel underneath the front arch, and around the rear underside of the tree from quarter to quarter. The sides of the tree that run horizontally along the horse's back are known as bars. Many modern trees are made with spring steel running from front to rear between the bars. These trees are somewhat flexible and are known as "spring trees," with the degree of flexibility varying from saddle to saddle. More recently, saddle manufacturers are using various materials to replace wood and create a synthetic molded tree (some still using spring steel and a steel gullet plate). Synthetic materials vary widely in quality. Polyurethane trees are often very well-made, but some very cheap saddles are made with fiberglass trees that are not so durable.

Leather is added on all sides of the tree to create the seat, flaps and panels. Cowhide is usually used, though pigskin and other leathers are also seen. The panels on the underside of the saddle traditionally are stuffed with wool flock, which is still preferred and used on the highest quality saddles. Synthetic materials, including foam and fiberfill materials, are used on more moderately priced saddles, and one company currently sells a design that uses airtight sealed panels that are inflated with air.

== Parts of the English saddle ==
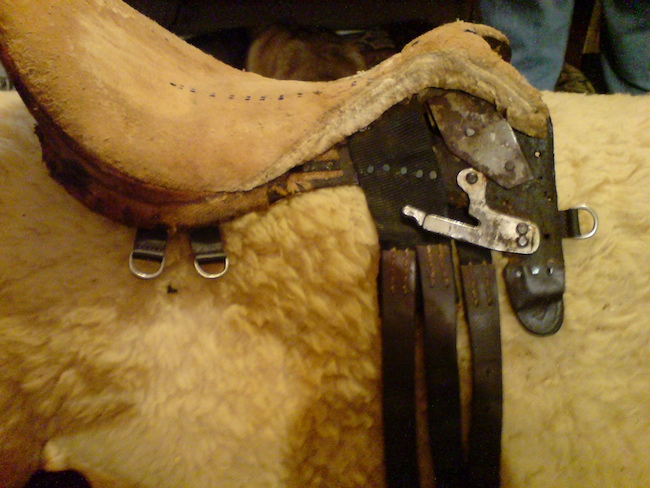
A saddle with most leather removed, showing tree and seat padding

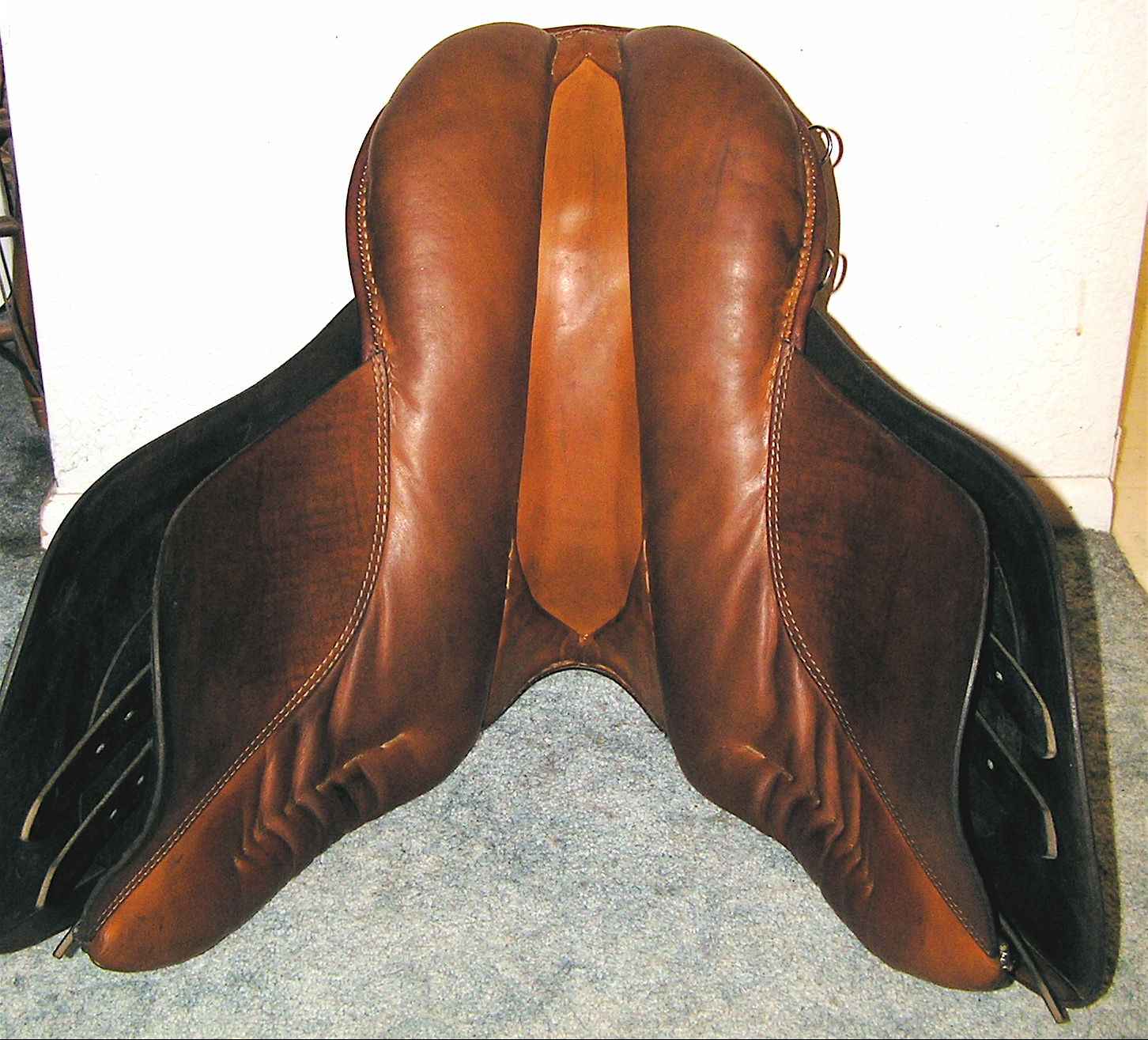
Underside of a Dressage saddle, showing panels, gullet, sweat flaps and tips of the billets

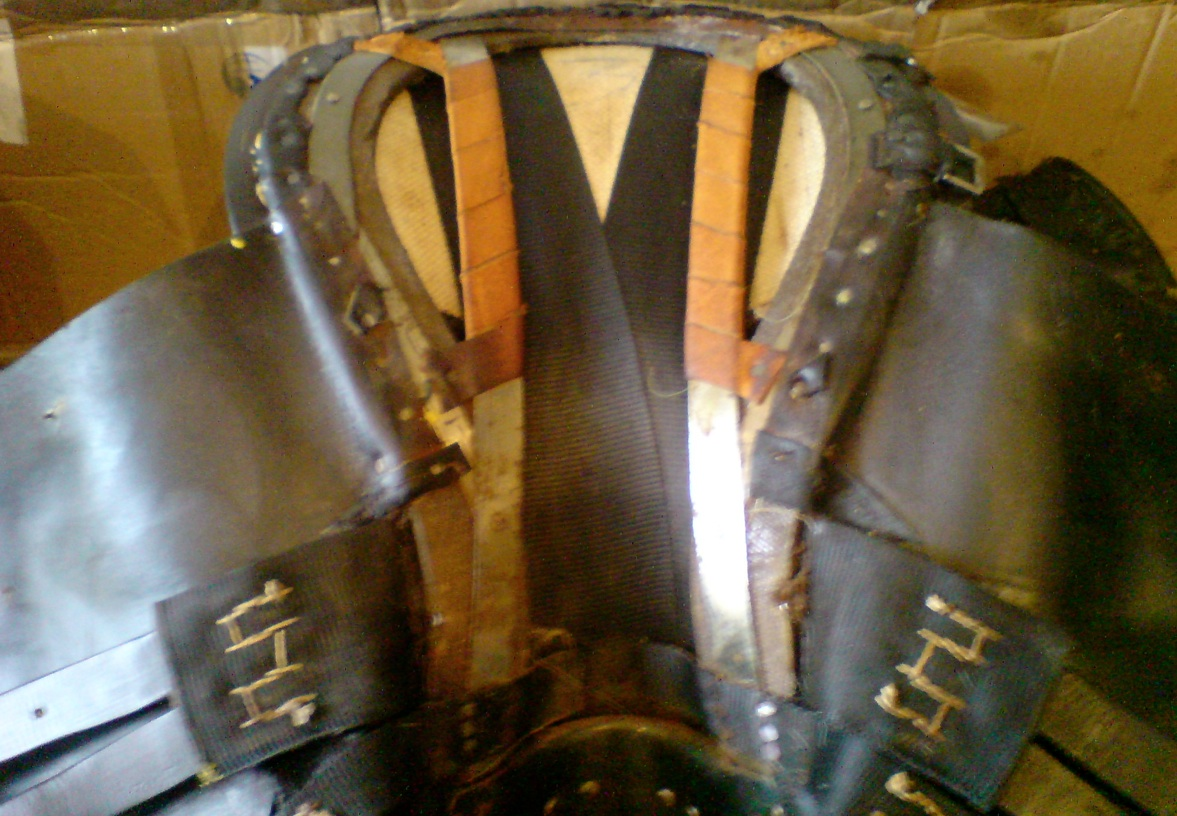
Stripped-down saddle, showing spring tree structure that underlies the panels

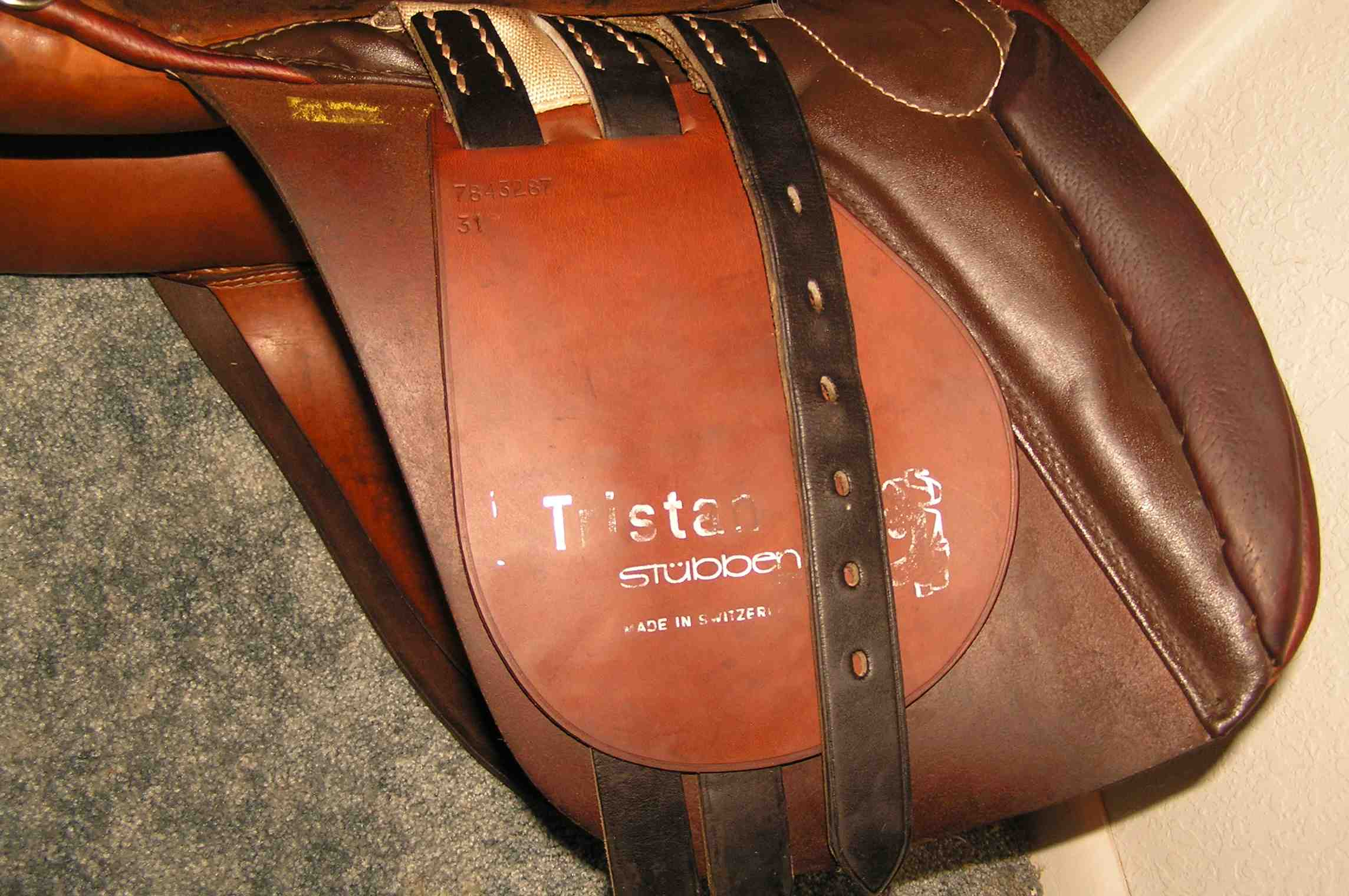
Billets, sweat flap, buckle guard, and knee rolls. These are under the flap of the saddle

- Tree: the base on which the rest of the saddle is built, usually based on wood or a wood-like synthetic material, with metal elements added, such as the stirrup bar and, in some cases, the gullet. It is eventually covered in leather or synthetic material as the saddle is built.
- Panels: the part of an English saddle which provides cushioning between the horse's back and the saddle, and allows adjustment in fitting the saddle to the horse. Also important in keeping the saddle balanced for the rider. Often stuffed with wool or foam flocking, or maintained by sealed air pockets. The panels under the cantle are called the "rear panels." Those at the front of the saddle are called the "front panels." However, the rear and front panels are one continuous unit, which can be seen if the saddle is flipped over. The saddle has two panels total, one on each side of the horse's spine.
- Gullet: The space between the bars of the saddle which provides clearance for the horse's spine so the saddle does not place pressure on it. The gullet width of the saddle is dictated by the front arch of the tree. In some models, the angle (and thus the width) of the front arch can be adjusted on an individual saddle by use of interchangeable elements. Though imprecise terminology, the gap between the stuffed panels is colloquially referred to as the gullet.
- Seat: the dip in the saddle where the rider's seatbones rest, it is the lowest part of the saddle's topline. The deeper the seat, the more security is provided for the rider.
- Pommel: the front of the saddle, which is raised higher than the seat both to provide security for the rider and to give the horse's withers clearance.
- Cantle: the back of the saddle, which is raised higher than the seat to give security.
- Waist or Twist: the part of the saddle between the seat and the pommel, on which the rider's pelvic bone rests. The width of the waist has a great effect on rider's comfort, especially for women riders.
- Skirt or Jockey: piece of leather that goes over the stirrup bar, to help prevent the rider's leg from rubbing on the buckle of the stirrup leather (which is adjusted so it is right against the stirrup bar). It also helps to keep the buckle of the stirrup leather from unbuckling and sliding down. The skirt is small to allow easy access to the stirrup leather.
- Saddle flap: The large piece of leather on the exterior of an English saddle that goes between the rider's leg and the billets and girth buckles. The shape and length of the saddle flap is directly related to the intended use of the saddle, as it must mirror the rider's leg position.
- Sweat flap: The large piece of leather on the underside of the saddle that goes between the billets and the horse. It helps to protect the rest of the saddle from the sweat of the horse, and the horse's skin from being pinched by the girth straps and buckles. In monoflap saddles it is lightweight and sewn to the saddle flap, with extended girth points enabling the girth to be buckled below the flap.
- Billets or points: Straps which are secured over the saddle tree on stout webbing and hang down, to which the girth is buckled. They have several holes in them to adjust the tightness of the girth. There are generally three billets, allowing a spare in the event one billet is torn or frayed. Some saddles have very long billets to buckle the girth below the saddle flap to reduce the bulk underneath the rider's leg, allowing for closer contact with the horse. The foremost point is usually attached to a narrow web, and the rear two to a wider web.
- Girth Buckle guard: the billets are threaded through the Girth buckle guard, which protects the saddle flap from getting worn away by the buckles of the girth. These are not always present on saddles with long billets, which are intended to be buckled below the saddle flap.
- Knee roll: the padded part at the front of the English saddle's panel and sweat flap, helping to give the rider more leg support. It may be very wide and thick, very thin (a pencil-roll), or not present at all. Additional padding on the outside flap of the saddle is sometimes added for extra grip.
- Thigh roll: the padded part at the rear of the panel's sweat flap, which lies behind the rider's thigh and can give extra stability in the saddle. Very common in dressage saddles but much less so in jumping saddles as it may interfere with freedom of movement of the rider's leg.
- Calf block: padding that falls behind the rider's lower leg, helps to keep it in place and stabilize the rider. It is only seen on a few saddle models.
- Stirrup: part of the saddle in which the rider's feet rest, provides support and leverage to the rider.
  - Stirrup Bar: part of the tree of the saddle which allows stirrups to be attached. It is made of strong metal and riveted to the tree. The stirrup bar is often kept in the "open" position, so that, should the rider fall and start to be dragged, the stirrup leather can release off the saddle, freeing the rider. There are only a few instances in which the bar should be kept in the "closed" position, and some stirrup bar designs cannot be closed.
  - Iron: The metal part of a stirrup, in which the foot of the rider rests. It provides support and leverage. It is usually made of stainless steel, not iron.
  - Leather: The part of the stirrup which attached the stirrup iron to the stirrup bar of the saddle. It can be adjusted to change the lengths of stirrups. Leathers is correct plural usage.
- Stirrup leather keeper: keeper sewn onto the saddle flap, through which the extra stirrup leather is passed. Keeps it neatly out of the way so it doesn't get under the rider's leg. Some saddles simply have a slot cut into the saddle flat, through which the leather is passed.
- D-ring or Staple: a metal ring with rounded or squared corners on the front of an English saddle, to which certain pieces of equipment, such as breastplates, can be attached. May be of stand-up or centrally hinged design. Some are stitched into leather and can be pulled out of the saddle when under stress. Some are fixed through the front arch of the tree for greater strength.

== History of the English saddle ==
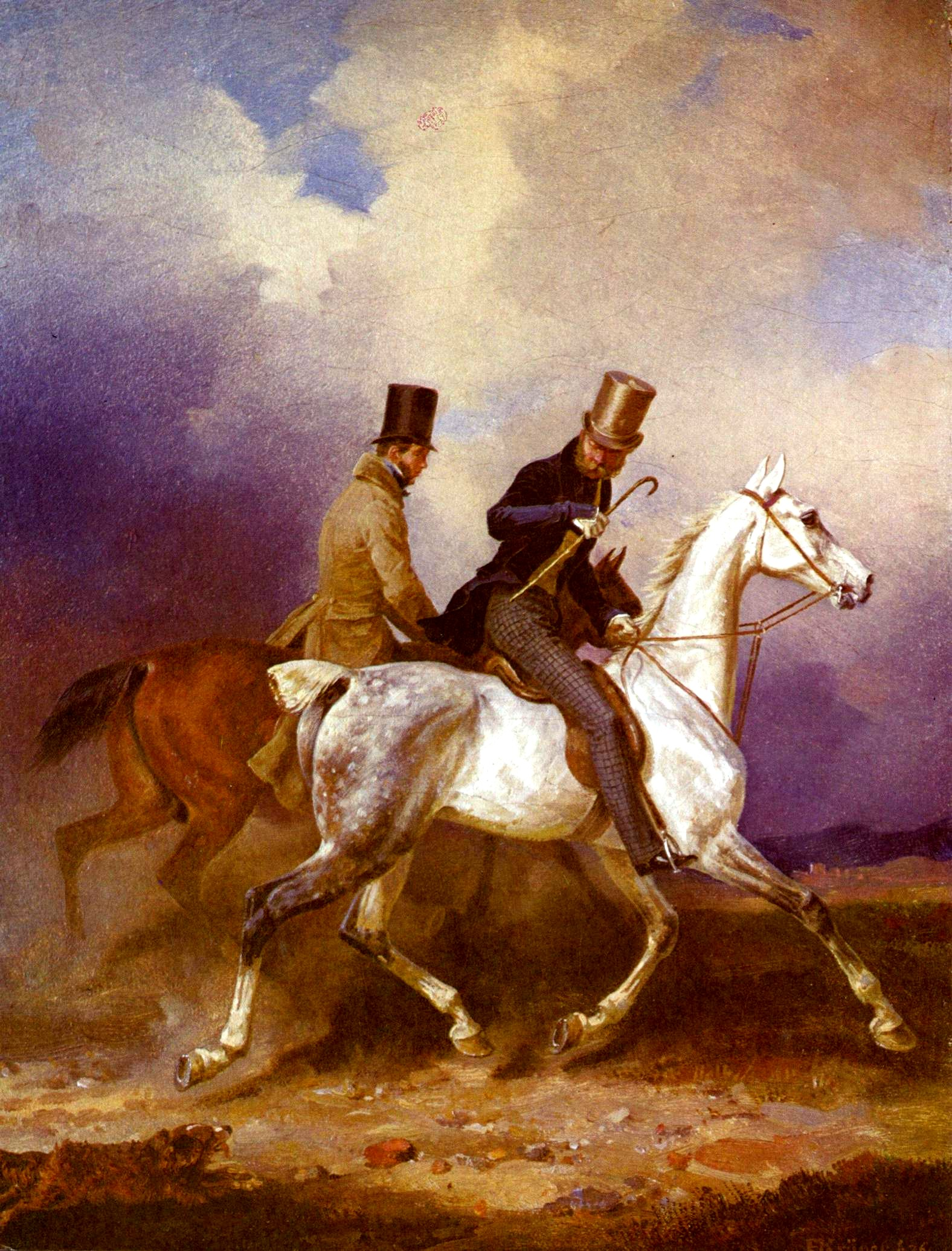
The traditional hunting saddle, with a low pommel and cantle, and no padding. Note the long stirrup and the rider's seat, his feet pushed forward, which was the common position of the time.

During the 18th century, most riders in Europe used high-pommel and cantle saddles, with a wooden frame for classical dressage. This saddle was based on a model used for bull fighting, cattle work, long-distance travel, and mounted combat, as its high pommel and cantle helped to provide the rider with support. This saddle is still used today, most notably by the Spanish Riding School, and also in Iberia and eastern Europe.

In England, foxhunting grew in popularity (as the usual quarry of deer had dwindled following the English Civil War, when they were hunted for food). This required a new type of riding, as horse and rider now had to tackle fences, hedges, ditches, and banks straight on if they wished to keep up with the hounds and witness the kill. The old saddle was cumbersome while hunting. Its cantle would get in the way of the riders as they tried to lean back over the fence (a practice that was common until Caprilli developed the "forward seat"), and the high pommel created pain as the rider went over jumps. The resulting saddle developed for foxhunting had a very low pommel and cantle with a flat seat, and no padding under the leg, therefore providing the rider with little, if any, support. The stirrup bars were protruding, and placed more forward than modern saddles, which made it nearly impossible for the rider to keep his legs underneath his body. However, the usual practice was to ride with longer stirrups, and the feet pushed out in front, so this was not a problem.

The English hunting saddle is the predecessor of all English-type riding saddles. As the sports of show jumping and eventing became more popular, saddle shape changed. Caprilli, Santini, and Toptani developed the "forward seat," in which the rider uses shorter stirrups and keeps his legs under him as he rode in two-point, with his seat bones hovering above the saddle. The shorter stirrup required a more forward flap, to match the greater knee angle of the rider. The protruding stirrup bars were uncomfortable in this new position, so they were recessed. The waist of the saddle was also made narrower. Additionally, padding was placed under the knee rolls, for extra security.

== Differences from Stock saddles ==
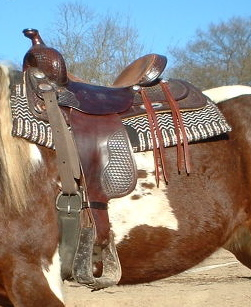
A western saddle. Note the lack of panels and addition of prominent pommels and cantle, the difference in stirrups, and the traditional horn.

The term English saddle encompasses several types, including those used for show jumping and hunt seat, dressage, Saddle seat, horse racing and polo. To non-horsemen, the major distinguishing feature of an English saddle is its lack of a horn. However, some Western saddles, such as those used to ride rough stock in rodeos and certain types of western-influenced saddles used in endurance riding, lack a horn as well. These saddles can still be classified as western-influenced, however, due to the deep seat, high cantle, prominent pommels, wide fenders (stirrup leathers) and large, leather-covered stirrups. In addition, saddles used for working cattle in nations other than the United States, such as the Australian Stock Saddle and the Charro Saddles of South America, often share stock saddle features such as a deep seat and extra leather to protect horse and rider, but lack a horn.

The other major characteristic which defines an English saddle is that it has panels: these are a pair of pads attached to the underside of the seat and filled with wool, foam, or air. Although some modern saddlers have developed alternative models, the English saddle is usually constructed on a framework known as a tree. The tree is made of wood, spring steel, or composite, and it supports the rider on a sling of webbing between the firm pommel (front of the saddle) and cantle (back of the saddle). On either side of the tree, a steel hook known as the "stirrup bar" is affixed. It is upon this hook that the rider hangs the stirrup leather, which is a very strong leather or nylon loop supporting the stirrup. More very strong leather or nylon straps known as billets (or girth points/straps - UK) are attached to stout webbing which is tacked across the top of the tree, to which will eventually buckle the girth--the beltlike strap which holds the saddle onto the horse.

The tree and its various parts are upholstered with a covering made of leather, nylon or microfiber and shaped to form the seat above and the panels below.

In addition to the seat and panels, English saddles feature leather flaps on either side; the underside flap is called the sweat flap, and the upper flap is called the saddle flap (or, simply and appropriately, the "flap"). The flaps sit between the rider's leg and the horse's side and protects the horse from being pinched by the stirrup leather or girth, and the rider's leg from being chafed by the girth buckles. On some saddles it is also specially padded to protect or support the rider's knee.

== Styles of English saddles ==
The differences between the styles of English saddle are small but significant. The most important distinctions are the location and therefore the balance of the seat, and the flap length and shape. A saddle used for a discipline where the rider sits more upright with a longer leg, such as in dressage, has a flap that is longer to accommodate the leg, and less inclined forward (as the knee does not need to go forward). The seat will also be closer to the withers, to keep the rider's center of gravity in the correct spot. However, in disciplines where the rider needs shorter stirrups for better balance and security, such as in the jumping disciplines, the saddle flap is moved proportionately forward and shortened, and the seat is moved further back. A jumping saddle will have a shorter and more forward flap than a dressage saddle, with the seat slightly more towards the cantle. If the flap was not inclined forward, the rider’s knee would hang over the flap, and the flap would constantly push the leg out of position (usually backward), so that the rider would become unstable and interfere with his horse. If the seat was not moved rearward, the rider would be forced ahead of the saddle over a fence. A racing saddle, where jockeys ride with incredibly short stirrups, will have an extremely forward and short saddle flap (almost more horizontal than vertical), and the seat will be extended well back from the pommel to keep the rider’s center of gravity correctly situated.

Supportive padding in the seat, size and shape of knee rolls and the use of additional blocks behind the leg is also considered when developing a saddle. While a polo saddle is constructed with a minimum of padding so as to allow the polo player great freedom to twist and reach for his shot, a saddle used for jumping or eventing may have more padding to help give the rider support over fences. Another development is the monoflap saddle, in which both the sweat flap and saddle flap are made of lighter weight leather, stitched together around the edges leaving only a passage point for the girth straps, thus reducing the thickness of leather between the rider and the horse, and giving a closer feel, while still protecting the horse's skin from straps.

=== All-Purpose or Eventing saddle ===
All-purpose or eventing saddle, crossing a deeper seat and long flap with a more forward flap placement.

The "all-purpose" or "eventing" saddle (also sometimes called a "general purpose" saddle) was developed to allow riders to use one saddle both over fences and on the flat. This type of saddle has a deep seat with a long, but somewhat forward flap. The flaps usually have padding under the leg, for support while jumping. The design is intended to be a compromise between the flatter "close contact" jumping saddle with a forward flap, and deep-seated dressage saddle with a long, straight flap.

This style of saddle is most commonly seen in amateur-owner or lower-level junior competition. The less-expensive "all-purpose" models are often marketed as beginner's saddles. More expensive models are usually labeled "eventing" saddles. Manufacturers insist that there is a significant design difference between an eventing saddle and an all-purpose saddle. However, while eventing saddles usually do have better balance and higher quality materials and workmanship, a fundamental design difference is otherwise difficult to discern. Many manufacturers create two models, one with a slightly straighter dressage-oriented flap that still allows a rider to jump low fences, and another with a more forward flap that allows a rider to jump somewhat more challenging fences, but still permit a deep seat for flat work. One company manufactures a design with a flap that can be adjusted to be straighter or more forward, as the rider prefers.

Due to the deep, secure-feeling seat, the design is also used by some people when starting young, unpredictable horses, and is quite popular for trail riding, endurance riding, and casual hacking. Many top-level endurance riders find this design superior to an "endurance" style saddle for distance competition because it allows them to get off the horse's back and move quickly over rough or mountainous terrain, yet provides greater security to the rider. On the other hand, this compromise design also means that an advanced rider may find the saddle limits his or her ability to obtain a correct position at higher levels of competition, either in show jumping or dressage. For this reason, some English riding instructors and coaches do not particularly encourage their riders to use these saddles.

Quality and balance are very critical factors to consider when purchasing an all-purpose saddle. Many cheap models are designed with a too-forward cut flap that is not properly aligned with the seat, which prevents the rider from getting into a correct position on the flat and sometimes gives the rider the uncomfortable sensation of feeling like they are constantly sliding backwards. Also, when the stirrups are adjusted correctly for jumping, the rider's knees are not always placed properly in relation to the flap. Some models also are too high in the cantle, which can hit a rider in the buttocks and push the seat too far forward when jumping all but the smallest fences.

=== The Jumping saddle ===
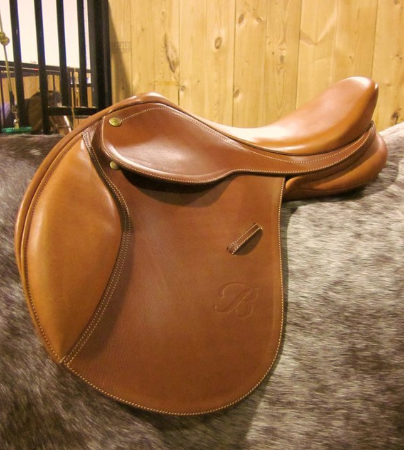
Jumping or "close contact" saddle, with more forward flap and design placing rider closer to horse

The jumping saddle, sometimes called a "forward seat" or "close contact" saddle, is designed for show jumping, hunt seat equitation, foxhunting, and the show jumping and cross-country phases of eventing. Its most distinctive feature is a forward-cut flap that allows for a shorter stirrup length (although not as short as racing stirrups). The flap often has supportive padded knee rolls, especially for show jumping and cross-country, less so for equitation. The balance of the seat is further back and comparatively flat, with the cantle and pommel low so that they do not interfere with the rider's jumping position (and variations known as "two-point position" or "half-seat").

Like the All-Purpose saddle, the jumping saddle usually has three short billets. However, other styles (such as monoflap jumping saddles) have longer billets that mirror the dressage saddle, so that the rider no longer has to ride with extra bulk under the leg.

It is important that the rider's leg fit appropriately into the flap of the jumping saddle when the stirrups are shortened. If the knee is too far forward or back, the rider's balance will be incorrect and the saddle becomes a hindrance rather than an advantage while jumping obstacles.

=== Dressage saddle ===
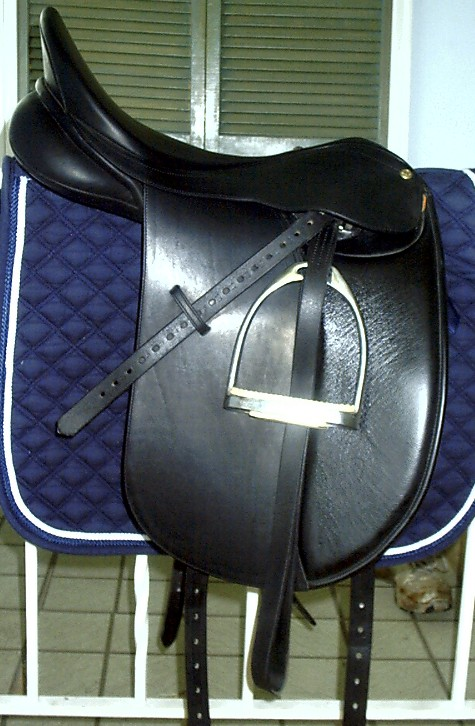
Dressage saddle, showing a long, straight flap.

Dressage saddles have a very straight-cut flap, much longer than a jumping saddle, which accommodates the longer leg position of a dressage rider, who works only on the flat and does not need to jump fences. The pommel is a bit higher and the deepest point of the saddle's seat more forward, all to allow for this longer leg position.

The seat is usually much deeper in a dressage saddle than a jumping saddle, and allows the rider to sit comfortably and relax to best influence the horse. The stuffing of the panels is often kept to a minimum in a dressage saddle, to allow a closer feel with the horse. It often has a wider bearing surface than a jumping saddle.

Some designs feature an exaggerated amount of padding in front of the knee, much more than in a jumping saddle, said to assist the rider in keeping the knee down and thigh back. However, there is usually little padding behind the calf, as the rider needs to be able to freely move the lower leg to give aids to the horse.

The billets of most dressage saddles are very long, to allow the girth to be buckled near the horse's elbow rather than underneath the rider's leg (which would get in the way of giving effecting leg aids). However, some dressage saddles come with shorter billets.

=== The Saddle seat saddle ===
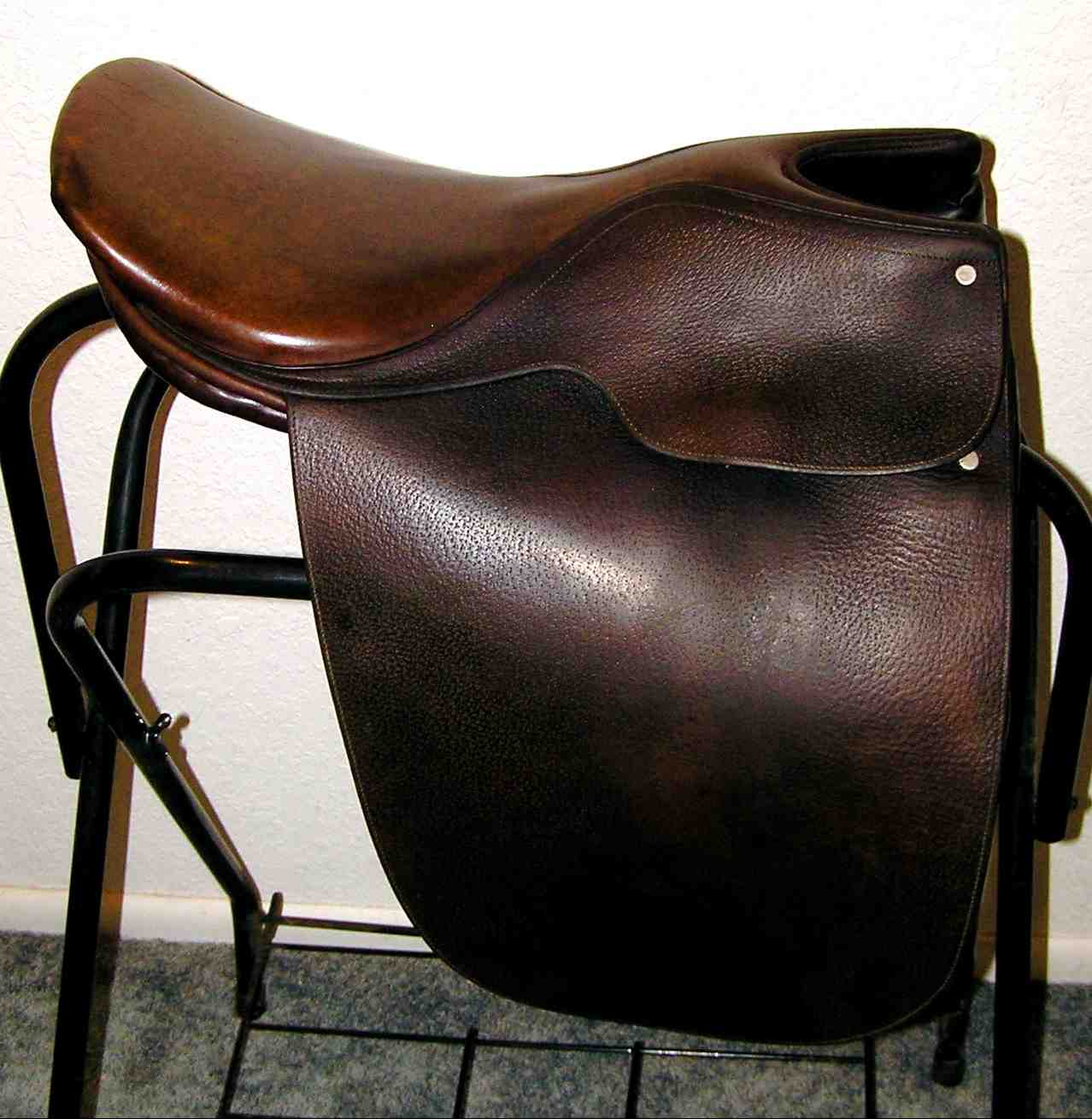
A "Saddle seat" style English saddle

The saddle seat saddle, also sometimes called a "Park," "Lane Fox" or "cutback," is a variation on the English show saddle. It is seen most often in the USA and Canada, but also on occasion in South Africa and other parts of the world. It is used most often on the high-action and gaited horses of the Americas. Gaited breeds using this saddle include the American Saddlebred, Tennessee Walking Horse, and Missouri Foxtrotter. Non-gaited but action-oriented breeds such as the Morgan and the Arabian, are commonly shown in saddle seat style, though these breeds also have hunt seat divisions.

The seat of this saddle is longer and flatter than that of a forward seat or dressage saddle. The seat places the rider's center of balance farther back on the horse than in other English riding disciplines, though correct saddle seat equitation still demands that the rider's legs and feet be balanced under the horse. The pommel is always cut back to allow greater freedom of the front legs and shoulder, as well as to accommodate the higher set neck and higher withers typical of the saddle seat breeds. The flap is wide front-to-back, with no blocks or rolls beneath, and ends closer to the cantle than any other English saddle so that the rider's leg (whose thigh is further back than in other styles because the seat is also farther back) is protected. Riders use very long stirrups, usually at least as long as those of dressage riders.

The saddle seat was developed from two sources. The first was a flatter European saddle developed to sit the rider further back to show off the high front leg action of flashy horses, often seen quite literally during Sunday rides in city parks. (See English Show Saddle, below.) The second source was the plantation saddle developed in the southern United States that allowed riders to sit back comfortably on a gaited horse as they covered large areas of land on a daily basis.

=== Endurance saddle ===
The Endurance saddle, originally based on a military or police saddle, is used for the long-distance competition of endurance riding. Its major task is to provide the horse and rider with the comfort and balance needed to cover long distances over rough terrain, sometimes for multiple days. For the rider, the seat is often quilted or padded, and the stirrups are designed with a wide foot tread to reduce fatigue. For the horse, the panels of the saddle are extended to provide a larger area of contact with the back, thus reducing fatigue linked to the pounds per square inch of saddle contact. The saddle has many dee rings along the pommel and cantle that allow the rider to attach various items.

Modern endurance saddle manufacturers have been innovative in methods to lighten weight and provide additional comfort for the horse, and several of these techniques have gone on to influence other saddle types. The panels are stuffed with different types of material, all designed to spread pressure evenly and disperse sweat. Most endurance saddles may have extended panels (called "fans" or "blazers"), which increase bearing area. Others may have "floating" panels, which are particularly useful since endurance riders often ride with their seat out of the saddle (releasing pressure from the back, but increasing the amount felt on the stirrup bars where they attach near the point of the tree).

There is also an endurance saddle design based on the western saddle that is a bit larger and heavier, but is designed with similar goals.

=== English showing saddle ===
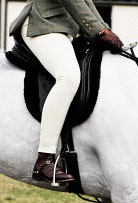
A modern English showing saddle with a dressage-like straight-cut flap, designed to show off the horse's shoulder

This saddle is used in the United Kingdom, Australia, and elsewhere, for showing on the flat or over low fences, and is a direct descendant of the English hunting saddle. The show saddle is designed to show off the horse's conformation, most notably the shoulder, and is therefore a minimal saddle with a close fit and straight-cut flap. The seat is very flat, and there are no knee or thigh rolls, so the saddle offers little support to the rider. Like the American Saddle Seat saddle, the English showing saddle has a stirrup bar set farther forward and a cutback pommel that falls behind rather than over the withers, though the seat is less flat and the rider's center of balance is closer to that of a dressage saddle. Many show horses are also presented in fatter condition than in more athletic disciplines, so the billets are placed to help keep the saddle properly placed on a rounder animal, with the foremost billet on show pony saddles frequently being attached directly to the point of the front arch of the tree; this is known as a "forward point".

The traditional position of the old style show rider was to ride with the feet placed forward, and the seat pushed back, which was once thought to encourage more action and to make the horse look as if it has a longer front end. Modern competitors are starting a trend to a more classical position, with the leg placed underneath their body and their hips over their heel, a position more forgiving on the horse's back that encourages better movement. The traditional English showing saddle is not used by these riders, and instead a more modern dressage-like saddle is used, with a more vertically cut flap. There sometimes is slight padding in these saddles, providing extra support, and the horses themselves are often shown in leaner, more athletic condition.

The American-style Saddle Seat position, set behind the horse's center of balance, somewhat resembles the old-style show position, though the modern rider remains balanced over the stirrups.

=== Sidesaddle ===
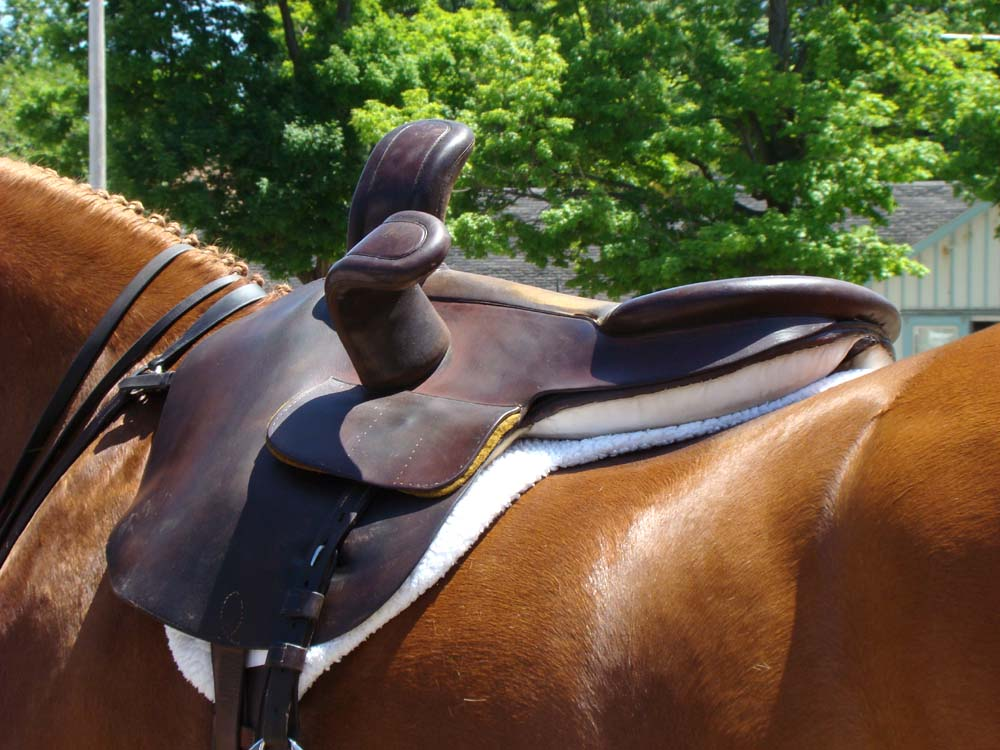
Sidesaddle, with 2 pommels.

The sidesaddle was used by women from approximately the 14th through 19th centuries, when a combination of long skirts and social mores discouraged women from riding astride. Today the saddle is still widely used for specialty purposes in shows, parades, and other exhibitions. It has use for practical purposes by some riders who have injuries that make it difficult to ride astride. A smaller number of riders feel that sidesaddle riding is a skill and riding art worth preserving and thus continue to practice the style, working to achieve greater skill and refinement.

Sidesaddles may be used in almost every discipline, including show jumping. In the USA, the four main divisions in modern horse shows are Western, Hunt seat, Saddle seat (the two English divisions use the same basic style of saddle but different bridles and rider appointments), and "historical," which may depict any culture or period, but must be fully researched and correctly utilized.

Although sidesaddles are still manufactured today, it is a small niche market, and a new sidesaddle is quite expensive. Thus most riders who wish to ride sidesaddle are often found hunting for older saddles at antique shops, estate sales, and in dusty barn lofts. It is difficult to find a sidesaddle that not only fits the rider and horse but also is in good condition.

The sidesaddle has only one stirrup leather, and two pommels: the fixed pommel (sometimes called a "horn" or "head") and the "leaping horn" or "leaping head". Although there are some sidesaddles that lack a leaping horn, they are not considered safe by modern standards. Both pommels allow the rider to stay in place, even when jumping. In fact, it may be difficult for the rider to be thrown free should the horse fall. The vast majority of sidesaddles are designed so riders sit with both legs on the near (left) side of the horse, though occasionally a sidesaddle is found that is reversed and allows the rider to sit with their legs to the off (right) side. In spite of having both legs to the side of the horse, properly positioned riders sit on the horse facing forward, with their spine centered in the saddle perpendicular to that of the horse, with weight balanced equally on both buttocks.

The seat must be wide enough to accommodate the rider's offside thigh as well as buttocks. A sidesaddle is comparatively flat from front to rear. Many have a small curved pommel and a long, raised cantle on the off side to support the offside thigh and to help riders keep their spine squared on the horse's back. On some designs, the seat of the sidesaddle is angled away from the side on which the legs lie to help the weight of the rider remain centered over the horse's back. The near-side flap is commonly cut forward to keep the rider's right leg and foot from touching the horse's left shoulder. The girthing of an English sidesaddle is usually a three-buckle system, with a usual full-length girth and an additional balancing girth. The stirrup of a sidesaddle is much shorter than in a conventional saddle, so that the rider's knee is placed close to the leaping horn, and it buckles midway down the leather rather than close to the tree.

=== Racing saddle ===
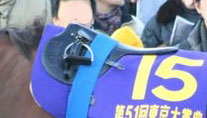
Racing saddle.

The flat racing saddle is designed to not interfere with a running horse and to be as lightweight as possible (including the stirrup irons). The racing saddle has a very long seat without a dip to it, combined with extremely forward flaps that accommodate the very short stirrups and extreme forward seat used by jockeys. It also has a flat pommel and cantle so nothing interferes with the rider. Flat-racing saddles are built on a half-tree to reduce weight; because the rider spends most of the time up over the horse's withers, there is no need for the protection to the horse's spine that a full tree provides. The stirrups, instead of being looped over stirrup bars, are generally looped directly over the wooden bars of the half tree to prevent the loss of a stirrup during a race and to reduce bulk. This saddle provides very little security, placing the rider in a position that allows a horse the freedom of movement needed to achieve maximum speed, but at the cost of giving the rider less leverage to control the horse, and less protection for the horse's back from a sitting rider. Therefore, racing saddles are not suited for general equestrian riding.

Most flat racing saddles weigh less than 1½ pounds; the lightest saddles weigh as little as 8 ounces. They generally have only one billet to attach the girth, and so an overgirth is usually added to keep it secure. Saddles used in steeplechases are generally slightly heavier and more substantial, usually being built on a full tree. Exercise saddles are usually larger and heavier, with a more prominent pommel and cantle to provide more security to the rider. Though these features add pounds, weight does not matter as it would in a race.

=== Polo saddle ===
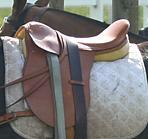
Polo saddle

The polo saddle is designed specifically for the mounted game. It has a relatively flat seat and the saddle flaps are long and fairly straight to accommodate the longer leg position, although more forward than the dressage saddle.

One of the defining features of the polo saddle is that there is very little or no padding under the leg, allowing the rider to have maximum freedom of movement. If the saddle had thigh or calf blocks, the leg would not be allowed to swing forward or back as needed.

== Fitting the English saddle ==
There are many factors to consider when fitting a saddle, and a professional saddle maker may be consulted to fit a saddle properly to a horse's back. Incorrectly fitting saddles cause pressure points, which may result in bruising, soreness, and behavior problems under saddle. The saddle must also fit the rider, as security on the horse can be compromised when a saddle is the wrong size.

=== Correct saddle placement ===
Before fitting the saddle, it must be positioned correctly on the horse's back.

The points of the saddle tree at the front arch should give a full three-fingers width of clearance behind the shoulder blade when the horse is standing straight, or a hand's width with the foreleg fully extended. This can be done by having someone on the ground pull each of the horse's forelegs as far forward as possible, holding the leg at the knee, while another person checks the shoulder blade.

The rider's weight should be carried on the muscles that are over the horse's ribs (from behind the shoulder blades to the last rib). The last rib of the horse should be found, and the saddle should not come behind it.

Many riders put their saddles too far forward, especially those that use jumping saddles. A properly fitting saddle will "find its own place" when put on over the withers, and then slid back until it will not easily slide further. Even a well-fitting saddle will cause discomfort to the horse and position problems for the rider if it is placed too far forward, creating problems that include:

- Interference with the horse's shoulder blades as it extends the forelegs, folds the legs over fences, or when the leading leg in canter or gallop is in the most rearward position (the top of the shoulder blade can move a full one and a half inches backwards from the standing position during canter and gallop). This also is damaging to the saddle, as it causes the tree to twist.
- Incorrect angle of the seat. When the saddle is too far forward the pommel rises up, tilting the cantle down and moving the seat back, so it is impossible for the rider to maintain a correct balanced position. This not only makes it extremely difficult for the rider to stay balanced, as they are constantly trying to scramble "uphill," but also places the majority of weight close to the cantle, and hence on the horse's loins.
- Harmful pressure areas because the tree points are more likely to dig into the withers. This causes extreme discomfort for the horse, and can produce bald spots and sores.
- Improper positioning of the girth too far forward, which can result in rubbing behind the elbows and lead to girth sores.
- The stirrup bars are placed forward of the natural drop of the stirrups, causing pressure from the rider's feet to push them to go too far forward, resulting in a "chair seat" position, so that correct balance is very difficult.

Saddles that are placed too far back (a common error made by inexperienced riders first learning to saddle a horse), or saddles with a tree that is too long (for example, a horse-sized saddle placed on a pony) also cause problems for horse and rider, including:

- High risk the saddle will slip sideways. The horse's barrel becomes wider and rounder the farther back it goes, and the withers also become lower before blending into the back altogether, leaving nothing to prevent the saddle from sliding.
- Pressure on the horse's loins, which is not only uncomfortable for the animal, but may cause damage to the spinal column, particularly the lumbar vertebrae, which are not supported by the ribs.
- Pinching and pain in the loins and hips.
- Lack of balance by the rider in the saddle, as the rider will be perpetually behind the motion of the horse.
- Misbehavior by the horse due to discomfort.
- The pommel of the saddle will drop downwards, making the rider 'slide downhill' in the saddle and increasing the risk of a fall over the shoulder.

=== Fitting the horse ===
A saddle must be measured for width, length, and front arch height (clearance over the withers). In ideal circumstances, the saddle is tried on the horse prior to purchase, or is purchased with a return option if it does not fit. When saddle shopping, or if having a saddle custom-made, one method of sizing the horse is known as a "wither tracing." To create this, an artist's flexicurve or a piece of coat hanger wire is placed up over the withers about two inches behind the horse's shoulder blade, then shaped to fit across the withers. The shape is then traced onto heavy paper or cardboard. An average horse can be fitted with just this measurement by comparing the angle of the wither tracing to the angle of the piping at the front arch of the saddle. However, horses with an unusual shape are measured in three locations, the second measurement approximately two inches behind the first one, and the last measurement nine inches behind the withers. Often for accurate measurements, a professional saddle fitter may need to be consulted.

==== Tree width ====
The tree width, which dictates the width of the saddle and height of the gullet, is one of the most important factors when fitting the saddle, and can be tested easily by looking at the sweat pattern on the animal's back after work. A tree that is too narrow is more of a threat than one too wide, as it pushes the points of the saddle tree into the horse's back. This will often result in a hollowing if it persists for long periods of time. The sweat pattern will have even sweating along the panels, except for the points of the tree, which will cause round dry spots in the area of sweat, as a result from the pressure.

A saddle that is slightly too wide will not be as much of a problem. However, a saddle that is much too wide will not have adequate wither clearance, especially on a high-withered horse, causing pressure in this area. Too much pressure in the short term can lead to rubs and saddle sores, long-term problems may include damage to the thoracic vertebrae that make up the withers.

==== Panels ====
The panels need even pressure. The bearing surface of the panels should be as large and even as possible, within the confines of the saddle design. Poor flocking (stuffing) or pressure points from the saddle tree will decrease the bearing area. Uneven fit increases the pounds per square inch in a given area of the back, which can lead to soreness or even injury.

Distribution of flocking can be tested by running the hands down the panels while applying slight pressure. If the panels are stuffed unevenly (one panel higher than the other, or stuffing that is hard and lumpy rather than smooth), the saddle will have pressure points and could cause soreness. A saddle fitter can check to make sure see if the panels are correctly stuffed for the horse. The front panels should have pressure evenly distributed down their front, which can be tested by saddling the horse, tightening the girth, running the hands down the front panels to feel for even pressure. The back panels should not rise off the horse's back when it is ridden.

==== Height of the gullet ====
The saddle should provide adequate clearance for the spine and withers. With the horse's heaviest rider sitting on the saddle, there should be at least three fingers width between the pommel and the withers, and when girthed up with a thin pad or no pad, it should be possible to look down the gullet and see light at the other end. The gap between the panels should also be about three inches wide all the way down, pommel to cantle, though heavily built animals may need four or more inches of width here to avoid pressure on the ligament over the spine.

=== Fitting the rider ===
Saddle properly fitted to rider

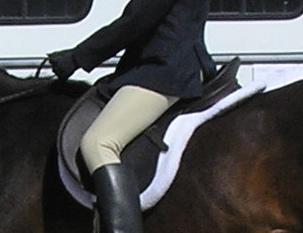
Saddle too large for rider

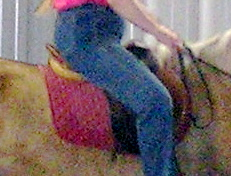
Saddle too small for rider

The fit of the saddle to the rider is also critical, as a poorly fitting or badly designed saddle will disrupt the rider's balance by either pushing the rider backwards, behind the horse's center of balance, or lead to incorrect form as a way to compensate for a lack of balance in the saddle. Just as an athlete cannot perform their best if they have shoes that do not fit, even excellent riders have a difficult time riding well in a poorly balanced or ill-fitting saddle. Therefore, it is best to find a model that is comfortable and allows the rider to easily maintain the correct position.

All English saddles are measured from the nailhead below the pommel to the center of the cantle. In the USA, English saddles, other than saddle seat styles, are manufactured in standard sizes for adult riders ranging from 16½ to 18 inches. Standard Saddle Seat sizes range from 19 inches to 21 inches. Most styles also manufacture proportionately smaller saddles for children. However, seat measurement is not a hard and fast way to determine if a saddle will fit a given rider. No two saddles are identical; there can be 1/4" variation between saddles of different brands with the same size designation. Length of thigh often plays a greater role in selecting a proper seat size than does rider weight or hip width. As a rough rule of thumb, sizes 16½ and below (19" for Saddle Seat) are generally for youth riders and smaller women. 17 and 17½ inch saddles are usually suitable for adult women of average size, with the 17 inch seat more suitable for shorter riders and the 17½ for those with a longer thigh (20" and 21" for Saddle Seat). 18 inch saddles are the most common size for adult men and larger women. (21" for Saddle Seat, with larger custom sizes sometimes available). Saddles are also manufactured with different flap lengths to accommodate riders of different sizes.

Factors in saddle fit for a rider include the following:

- Pommel/Cantle height: the cantle should be slightly higher than the pommel, so the seat is not too far back (which would tip the rider backward and force the lower legs forward).
- Seat: the lowest part of the seat should also be the narrowest part of the saddle, the waist or twist, in order to balance the rider over the horse. When the rider is centered in the saddle, the length of the seat should allow about one hand's width both behind the rider's seat and in front of the pelvis. A saddle that is too small is uncomfortable to ride in and does not allow the rider the security provided by sitting deep in the saddle. A saddle that is too big does not provide any support for the rider and allows the seat to slide around too much. However, flap size and length of the rider's thigh bone also influence the length of seat needed.
- Twist or Waist: the narrowest part of the saddle needs to fit the rider's pelvic structure so that the seat bones properly support the rider. This varies by age, weight and gender. If either too wide or too narrow, considerable discomfort may result. Some saddle twists are designed more for the pelvic structure of men than for women and thus may be uncomfortable for the other gender.
- Saddle flap: with the stirrups at the appropriate riding length (which will differ according to experience and riding discipline), the knee should not come too far behind the flap (so the flaps do not provide any support), or too far in front (which will force the lower leg back and severely disrupt the balance of the rider.
- Position of the stirrup bars: The bars must be properly balanced under the saddle so that the rider is not put off balance when rising in the stirrups (such as when posting or jumping) Riders also should check that the stirrup bars are properly recessed and do not stick out in such a way that the buckles of the stirrup leathers will cause bruising or rubs on their legs. Finally, particularly with used saddles, the rider must verify that the safety release mechanism works properly to release a stirrup leather in the event a rider falls and is tangled in the stirrups.

=== Consequences of poor fit ===
Long term, poor saddle fit may cause multiple back problems for the horse. It is possible for the horse's topline muscles to deteriorate, or for the horse to develop the wrong muscles. The muscles of the back just rear of the withers may atrophy, causing hollows right behind the shoulders, giving the withers the appearance of being higher and sharper. Horses may also lose muscle tone from traveling with a hollowed back, leading to increased risk of lordosis ("swayback"), kissing spines, or pinched nerves. For riders, spending long hours in a poorly fitting saddle may result in lower back pain as a consequence of incorrect pelvic angle. Saddles that are too small may also cause discomfort if the rider's seat is pushed into contact with the pommel.

Evidence of a saddle with a poor fit include:

- Sore back or "cold" back
- Hollowing of the back, raising the head, and tensing the jaw against the bit while under saddle
- General stiffness or one-sidedness, shown by a reluctance to take one lead over the other at the canter or reluctance to turn in one or both directions
- Shortness of stride
- Unwillingness to work, including "napping" or "balking" (refusal to go forward), Bucking, rearing, bolting, or overall sour attitude
- Uneven wear on the hooves
- Reluctance to be saddled, exhibited by fidgeting, tooth grinding, biting or kicking).
- Intermittent or unexplained lameness
- Uneven sweat or dirt pattern under the saddle after a workout, particularly dry spots in an area that should normally be sweaty. For example, two dry spots just behind the withers on either side of the back are indicative of either excess pressure causing reduced circulation. Dry spots in the center of the back may indicate "bridging" of the saddle - no contact with the back in a location where the saddle should be in contact. Riding with a white cloth under the saddle is used as a diagnostic tool to make uneven patterns more visible.
- Rub marks under the saddle. The hair may become sweaty, but shouldn't be roughed up to the point it lays sideways or backwards to its direction of growth. Roughened hair may indicate either rubbing and instability due to poor fit, or it may be due to improper saddle placement (particularly putting the saddle on too far back and pushing it forward, pulling the hair the wrong direction).
- In extreme cases, open sores or patches of white hairs (from death of cells due to abnormal pressure) sometimes called "saddle marks."

== Places of manufacture ==
English saddles are made in many places around the world. A traditional manufacturing centre is in Walsall, England. Other countries that produce fine English saddles are Ireland, France, Germany, Australia, Italy, Switzerland, Canada and the United States. Argentina produces many English saddles, particularly for the polo market, as well as a large number of brands that are in the mid-range of prices for other disciplines. The least expensive saddles are usually manufactured in India and can vary tremendously in quality of both workmanship and leather.
