= Swayback =

Abnormal spinal alignment

Swayback, also known clinically as lordosis, refers to abnormally bent postures in the backs of humans and of quadrupeds, especially horses. Extreme lordosis can cause physical damage to the spinal cord and associated ligaments and tendons which can lead to severe pain. In horses, moderate lordosis does not generally impact an animal's usefulness and does not necessarily cause lameness.

== Humans ==
Swayback posture in humans is characterised by the posterior displacement of the rib cage in comparison to the pelvis. It looks like a hyperextension of the lower back, but this is not necessarily the case. Most swayback cases exhibit a posteriorly tilted pelvis; the lumbar region is usually flat (too flexed) and not hyperlordotic (too extended).

== Horses ==
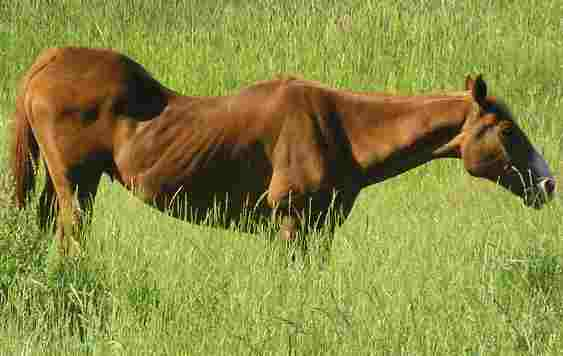
A severely swaybacked horse

Usually called "swayback", soft back, or low back, an excessive downward bend in the back is an undesirable conformation trait. Swayback is caused in part from a loss of muscle tone in both the back and abdominal muscles, plus a weakening and stretching of the ligaments. As in humans, it may be influenced by bearing young; it is sometimes seen in a broodmare that has had multiple foals. However, it is also common in older horses whose age leads to loss of muscle tone and stretched ligaments. It also occurs due to overuse or injury to the muscles and ligaments from excess work or loads, or from premature work placed upon an immature animal. Equines with too long a back are more prone to the condition than those with a short back, but as a longer back is also linked to smoother gaits, the trait is sometimes encouraged by selective breeding. It has been found to have a hereditary basis in the American Saddlebred breed, transmitted via a recessive gene. Research into the genetics underlying the condition has several values beyond just the Saddlebred breed as it may "serve as a model for investigating congenital skeletal deformities in horses and other species."

== Small ruminants ==
In small ruminants (sheep, goats, deer), swayback is the common term for the enzootic ataxia, a disease in young animals due to copper deficiency in fetal and early postnatal development.

== See also ==
- Spinal posture
- Scoliosis
