= Equine massage =

Practice of massage on horses

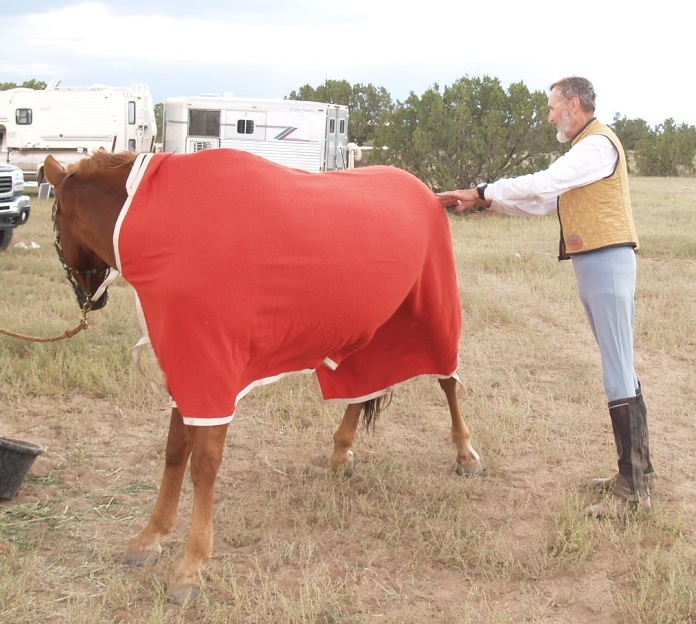
An endurance race horse receiving a post-race massage

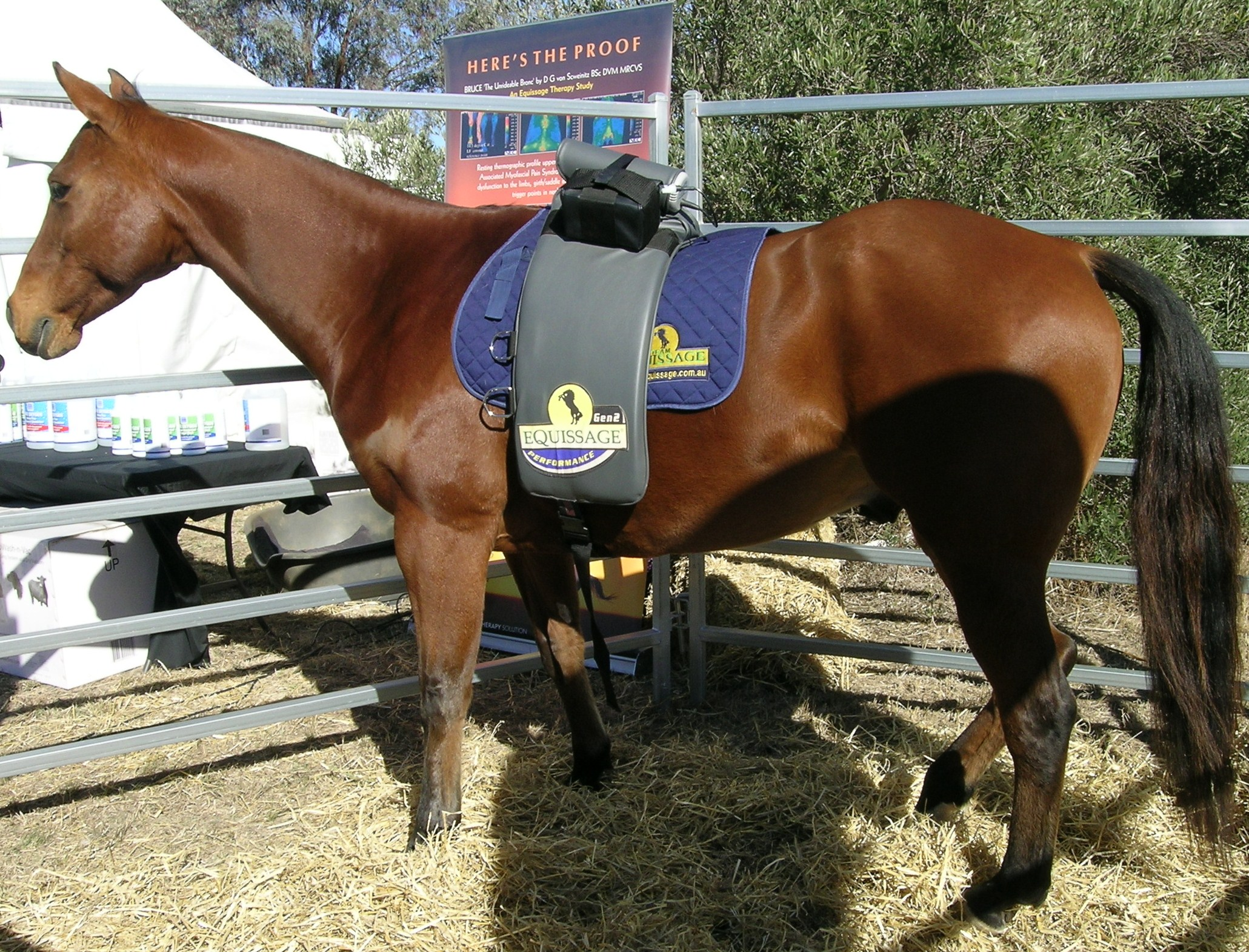
Equine massage back pack

Equine massage is the practice of massage on horses. Beginning in the early 1990s, it has been a growing field of equine therapy, used for both day-to-day riding and post-trauma rehabilitation. Proponents list a number of positive effects, including the improvement of movement and the reduction of pain and stress responses.

== Practice ==
Hands-on therapies, including massage, acupressure, and joint mobilization, were some of the fastest growing equine therapy categories in the early 1990s.

Equine massage uses the hands, fingers, and elbows of the therapist, and other tools, including tennis balls and vibrating tools. During the massage, the soft tissue is manipulated with the goal of loosening tight muscles, joints, tendons, scar tissue, and edema; increasing blood flow and lymphatic activity; and reducing stress. Equine massage is used in exercise warm-up and after injury or for surgery rehabilitation.

== Scientific study ==
Massage in horses uses many techniques first used for human massage, and it is becoming more common in both competitive equestrian disciplines and pleasure riding. Proponents say that equine massage improves movement and reduces pain and stress responses. Massage affects the muscular system at the cellular and fascial levels, as well as physiologic systems. Preliminary research demonstrates possible benefits in exercise recovery, but additional rigorous research is needed to further examine these possibilities.

== Regulation, training, and associations ==
In the United States, the legal requirements vary by state and are determined by each state's veterinary board. Presently, some states require veterinary supervision, while others do not. Many schools offer certification programs in the areas of animal and companion massage. The National Board of Certification for Animal Acupressure and Massage offers certification for practitioners. The International Association of Animal Massage and Bodywork is another association of animal massage and bodywork practitioners, including equine massage therapists.
