= Back (horse) =

In horse anatomy

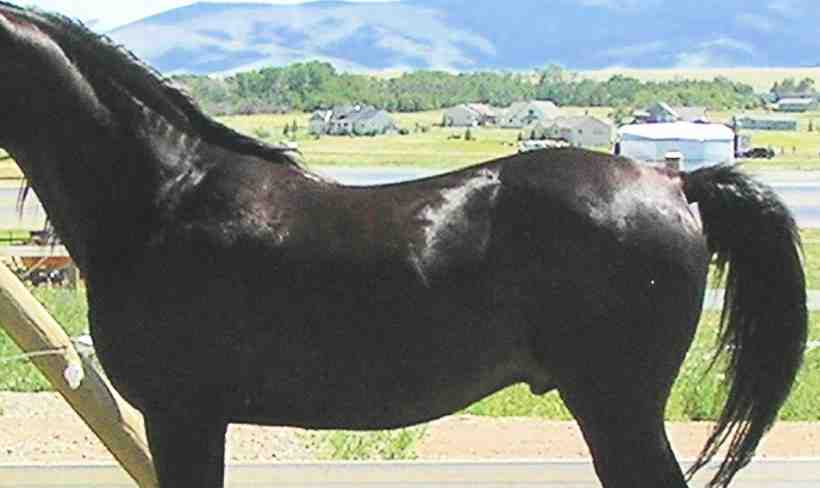
A horse's back

The back is the area of horse anatomy where the saddle goes, and in popular usage extends to include the loin or lumbar region behind the thoracic vertebrae that also is crucial to a horse's weight-carrying ability. These two sections of the vertebral column beginning at the withers, the start of the thoracic vertebrae, and extend to the last lumbar vertebra. Because horses are ridden by humans, the strength and structure of the horse's back is critical to the animal's usefulness.

The thoracic vertebrae are the true "back" vertebral structures of the skeleton, providing the underlying support of the saddle, and the lumbar vertebrae of the loin provide the coupling that joins the back to the hindquarters. Integral to the back structure is the rib cage, which also provides support to the horse and rider. A complex design of bone, muscle, tendons and ligaments all work together to allow a horse to support the weight of a rider.

== Anatomy of the back ==
The structure of the back varies from horse to horse and varies a great deal by breed, age and condition of the animal.

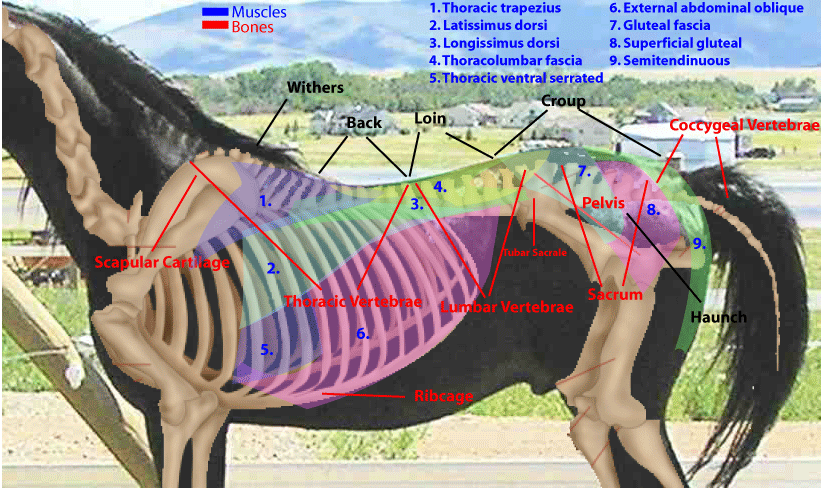
Anatomy of a horse's back

== Skeleton ==
A horse has an average total of 18 thoracic vertebrae, with five located in the withers. Each thoracic vertebra is also associated with a rib. A horse also has, typically, six lumbar vertebrae. Some breeds, such as the Arabian, will sometimes, but not always, have five lumbar vertebrae and 17 thoracic vertebrae. There appears to be little correlation between back length and number of vertebrae, as many horses with short backs do have the typical number of vertebrae. The length of each vertebra in the lumbar region seems to have the greater influence on the strength of the horse's back.

== Muscles and ligaments ==
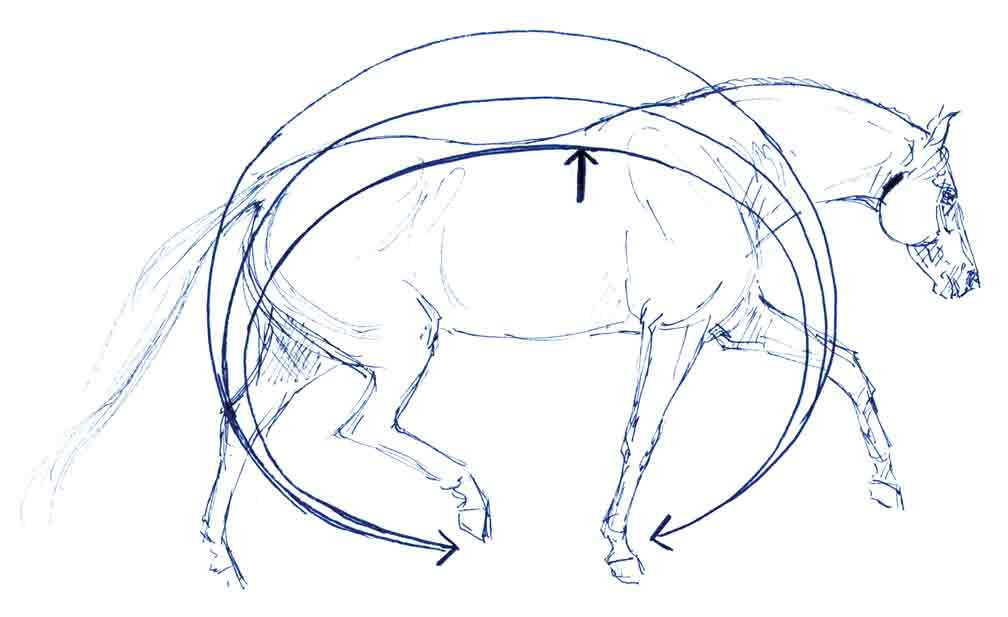
A complex interplay of bone and muscle, supported by powerful tendons and ligaments allows a horse to "round" under the saddle and best support the weight of a rider

The horse has no collarbone. Hence the entire torso is attached to the shoulders by powerful muscles, tendons, and ligaments. The spine of a horse's back is supported by muscles, three ligaments, and abdominal muscles. The Spinalis Dorsi originates on the fourth cervical vertebra and inserts beneath the thoracic section of the Trapezius. The Longissimus dorsi originates from the last four cervical vertebrae, and courses along the spine, inserting eventually into the ilium and sacrum. This muscle contracts the spine and also raises and supports the head and neck, and is the main muscle used for rearing, kicking, jumping, and turning. It is the longest and strongest muscle in the body, and is the muscle the rider sits on. The Intercostal muscles begin at the spaces between the ribs and aid in breathing. The external and internal abdominal obliques are attached to the ribs and pelvic bones, and support the internal organs. The Supraspinous ligament is a continuation of the nuchal ligament, which begins at the poll and inserts on the withers. The supraspinous ligament attaches to the tops of the remaining thoracic and lumbar vertebrae. These two ligaments in combination provide a link throughout the topline of the horse, aiding in the elastic movement of the body.

== Back conformation ==
The depth of a horse's topline may vary, from sway-backed to roach-backed.

Horses' back shape can vary greatly from horse to horse. The upper curvature of a horse's withers, back, and loin is called the "topline." The line of the belly from elbow to flank is the "under line" or "bottom line." In terms of the back, both are important; a long underline with a relatively short topline is ideal. The underline is where the abdominal muscles are, which, like in humans, can provide tremendous support to the back when well-conditioned. The topline will vary in length and in curvature, with some relationship between the two. When being ridden, a horse's back may either be stiff or relaxed as it moves, depending on the tension and strength of ligaments, muscles or tendons; and is also influenced by training and physical level of condition. The length of the back may affect smoothness of gait, ability to collect and move with agility, limits how much weight the horse can carry, and can impact if a horse might be capable of being laterally gaited. The height of the withers also varies and affects freedom of shoulder movement, length of stride, and is a major area of concern in proper saddle fitting.

A horse's back and ribcage in cross section is often described as "deep" or "narrow" (sometimes "shallow"), depending on the width of the ribs and the depth of the heartgirth. It can be a "pear" shape, an "apple" or inverted "U" shape, may be wide or narrow, short or long, or combinations of these characteristics. Wider but shorter ribs and loins will usually be stronger than long and narrow ribs and loins. If the ribs "fall off" of the back sharply, the back will be narrow, whereas if the ribs are well sprung, the back will be wide.

The average horse can carry up to approximately 25% of its body weight, but body build and, particularly, back structure, may allow it to carry somewhat more or less. Physical condition also plays a role. A horse that is in good physical condition, with well-developed abdominal and back muscles, will be able to carry more weight for a longer time than one that is not in shape.

There are two primary flaws in back conformation, a "too-straight" or "roach" back and its opposite, a too low or "swayback" (lordosis). Horses may also have "well-sprung" ribs or be too narrow, called "slab-sided." A horse may also have very high bony withers, which is not generally a flaw, though they can make a saddle hard to fit. Too low withers, called "mutton withers," can make it difficult to keep a saddle on without rolling or slipping, and may be correlated to a shorter stride.

A roach back is less common, but is characterized by a back that has insufficient curvature. Such animals will have difficulty with flexion and are often rough-gaited. Conformational defects such as straight shoulders often are correlated with a roach back.

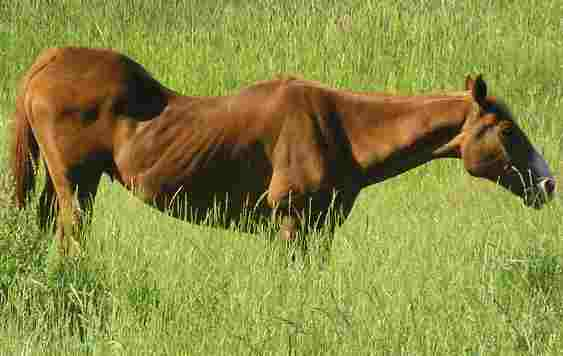
This older horse has a significant swayback

When the span of the back dips excessively in the center, a condition known as lordosis, it is called swaybacked (other names include saddle-backed, hollow-backed, low in the back, "soft" in the back, or down in the back). It is a common back condition, particularly in older horses, and in general an undesirable conformation trait. Swayback is caused in part from a loss of muscle tone in both the back and abdominal muscles, plus a weakening and stretching of the ligaments. As in humans, it may be influenced by bearing young; it is sometimes seen in a broodmare that has had multiple foals. However, it is common in older horses whose age leads to loss of muscle tone and stretched ligaments. It also occurs due to overuse or injury to the muscles and ligaments from excess work or loads, or from premature work placed upon an immature animal. Less often, a long-backed horse that is in poor condition may develop a sway at a younger age simply due to lack of exercise, particularly if kept in a stall or small pen for long periods without turnout. Equines with too long a back are more prone to the condition than those with a short back, but as a longer back is also linked to smoother gaits, the trait is sometimes encouraged by selective breeding. It has been found to have a hereditary basis in the American Saddlebred breed, transmitted via a recessive mode of inheritance. Research into the genetics underlying the condition has several values beyond just the Saddlebred breed as it may "serve as a model for investigating congenital skeletal deformities in horses and other species."

A low back may make a horse more prone to a stiff head and neck carriage and usually causes stiffness in the back and difficulty collecting. A horse with a long back and loin, while often considered a trait associated with smooth gaits, is prone to developing a swayback sooner than average. A swayback often makes it harder for the horse to collect, particularly for dressage and any event that involves jumping. A swayed back is a predisposing cause of "kissing spines." A sway back can also be linked to back soreness to a horse's saddle because most saddles will "bridge," putting the rider's weight only on the front and the back of the saddle, creating abnormal pressure points, especially over the shoulders and loins. A heavy rider may also put additional strain on already weakened ligaments and muscles. A swaybacked horse is less able to achieve rapid impulsion; which may cause problems in such sports such as horse racing, rodeo and polo. However, with a properly fitting saddle that does not bridge, a swaybacked horse still can be used as a pleasure horse and as a horse for teaching students.

=== Length of back ===
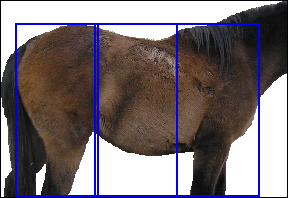
This yearling has a very short back, noted by the overlapping blue rectangles, and is also a bit roach-backed. It has short coupling and will be a sturdy animal, but could be rough-gaited

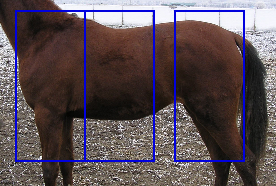
This yearling horse is a bit long in the back, as shown by the identically sized blue rectangles. its back will be more likely to sway as it gets older, but will probably be very smooth-gaited

Ideally, the length of a horse's back from the peak of the withers to the point of the hip should be 1/3 of the horse's overall body length (from the point of the shoulder to the point of the buttock, excluding head and neck). A horse's back is called "long" if the length exceeds 1/3 and "short" if less than 1/3. Long backs are more often seen in "gaited" horses, such as Saddlebreds or Tennessee Walkers. They are sometimes, but not always, associated with long, weak loins. The advantage to a long back is that it is flexible, making the movement of the back flatter, quieter, and makes a smoother ride. Even horses that are not gaited often have a smoother trot and long strides, making them comfortable to ride. On the other hand, it makes it harder for the horse to lift or "round" the back to develop speed or engage the hindquarters for high levels of collection. It takes longer to develop the muscles in a long back, and they are more prone to muscular strain and swayback as they age.

A moderately short back is generally a desirable trait and can be seen in any breed, though it is more common in American Quarter Horses, Arabians, and Morgans. The advantage to a short back is that the horse is quick, agile and strong, able to change direction with ease. A horse with this conformation is less likely to have back pain associated with the weight of the rider, especially if well-muscled. A short back is usually associated with being "short coupled," that is, short in the loin, making a horse of this conformation ideal for such agility sports as polo, roping, cutting, and reining. However, a short back can be less flexible if too short, and even ideally-conformed horses with short backs can have "springy" gaits that may cause difficulties for inexperienced riders. A too-short back can lead to spinal arthritis if the horse has difficulty bending.

== Fitting saddles to the back ==
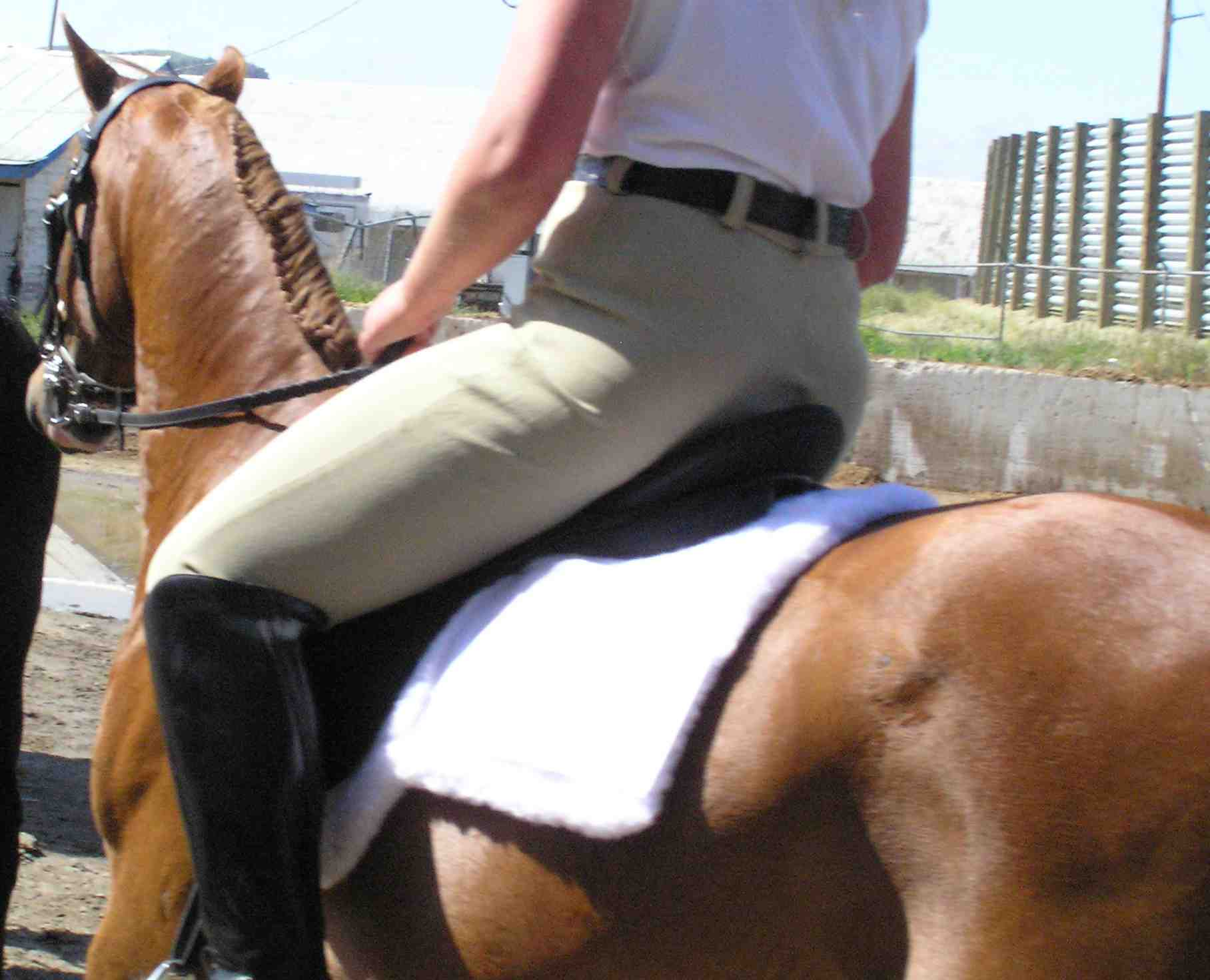
The length, width and shape of a horse's back all play a role in proper saddle fit.

Each horse is different regarding saddle fit, though minor problems can be compensated for with saddle blankets or pads. As a horse's muscles change with age or conditioning, one saddle may not fit during its entire life, and no saddle fits all horses. A properly fitted saddle should have enough height in the gullet to clear the withers of the horse and not be so wide as to press on the spine, but not be so narrow as to pinch the back and shoulders of the horse. It must not be so long in the tree that it interferes with the horse's hips, though a too-short tree may also create abnormal pressure points, particularly when it is too small for the rider as well. Professional saddlers and saddle-fitters may be able to make small adjustments in better-quality saddles to help them better fit an individual horse, but the underlying structure of the saddle tree cannot be changed and must have an adequate fit from the outset.

== Back pain ==
=== Causes ===
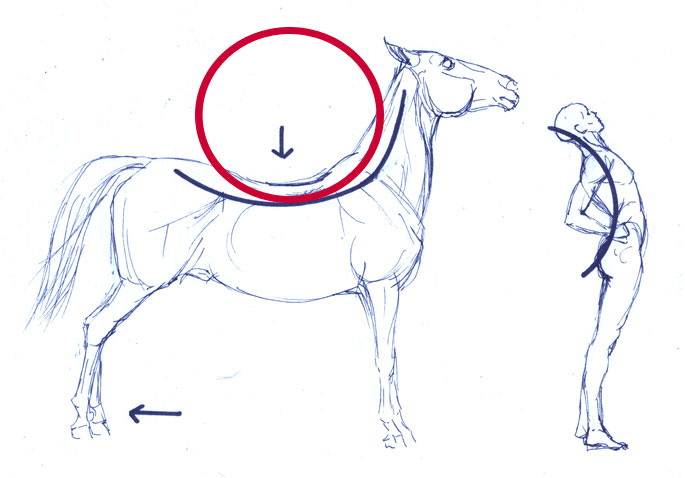
Back pain in a horse may be related to movement in an unnatural and stressed position, not unlike those that cause back pain in humans.

Back pain in a horse may be caused for a variety of reasons. Saddle fit, poor riding technique, lack of conditioning, overwork, accidents, or lameness can all contribute to back pain. A saddle that is not fitted properly on the horse may lead to immediate, acute pain, or chronic, long-term damage. A saddle of ill fit will repeatedly bruise, pinch, or rub the underlying soft tissue or spinal processes. A horse that is not athletically fit may also experience back pain. Abrupt changes in work, footing, or terrain can make even a fit horse suffer soreness. Accidents, missteps, or awkward jumps all lend themselves to strain. Compensating for any type of limb, joint, or hoof injury can make a horse put extra stress on its back, which can lead to back problems in addition to lameness if not treated promptly. A rider with a poor seat can put abnormal pressure directly on a horse's back, or may indirectly cause back pain in other ways: An ill-fitting bit and bridle or bad hands, resulting in mouth pain, can cause secondary back pain as the horse lifts its neck and stresses its back to avoid the pressure to the mouth.

=== Diagnosis ===
A veterinarian or experienced horse owner can palpate the back of a horse to pinpoint sources of pain and from there assess the most likely cause. Radiographs (X-Rays) can be used to diagnose potential problems with cracked vertebrae, some forms of arthritis, impinging dorsal spinous processes (kissing spines), and other skeletal problems, although with large, heavily muscled animals this diagnostic modality is limited. Certain types of soft tissue injury can be assessed with other modern diagnostic imaging techniques, such as ultrasound. In addition, Scintigraphy is often very useful in localising either bony or soft tissue disorders.

For mild problems, it is sometimes useful to ride the horse in a different saddle or without a saddle to see if the problem goes away, but usually a veterinarian or saddle fitter can determine if an ill-fitting saddle is the problem in fairly short order. Failure to obtain a reliable veterinary opinion can lead to further damage if the horse is worked while in pain.

=== Treatment ===
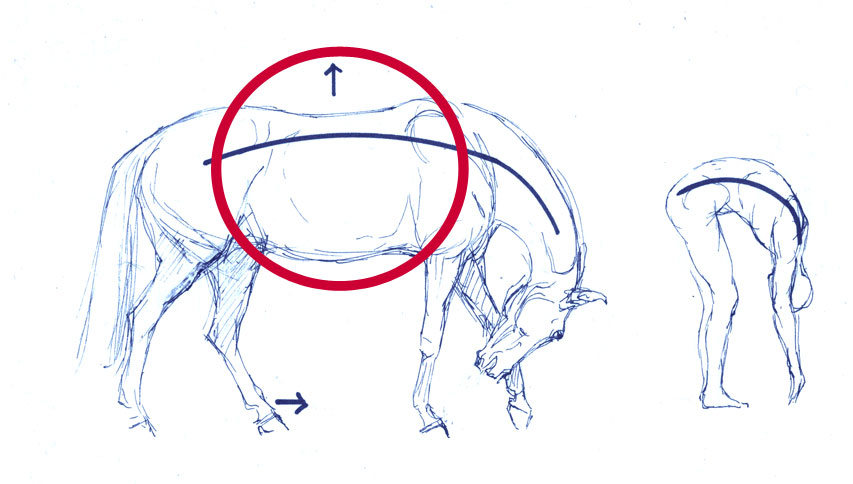
Horses' backs can be eased by adapting some techniques from human physical therapy to use on equine anatomy

Like humans, back pain in horses may be treated by acupuncture, massage therapy, chiropractic treatments, ultrasound, simple rest, targeted exercises, or a combination of any of the above. Drug treatment may also be advised, particularly the use of NSAIDs, or other anti-inflammatory and analgesic medications. In all cases, the first step is to eliminate the root cause of pain to the horse so that the animal is not reinjured after treatment. Degenerative or arthritic back pain is much harder to treat, so prompt attention is advisable in order to avoid a long-term problem.

If it seems the back pain is caused by an ill-fitting saddle, the saddle should be changed or adjusted, though as an interim measure a horse can be ridden without a saddle or with a saddle pad that is either thicker or thinner, as needed to reduce saddle pressure. To avoid causing back pain caused by lack of athletic fitness, gradually build the horse's athletic agility until it is strong enough to avoid getting sore in the back. Back pain related to stress or injury may require rest and time without being ridden, with a gradual return to work.

== See also ==
- Lameness (equine)
- Saddle
