= Whippletree (mechanism) =

Mechanism to distribute force evenly through linkages

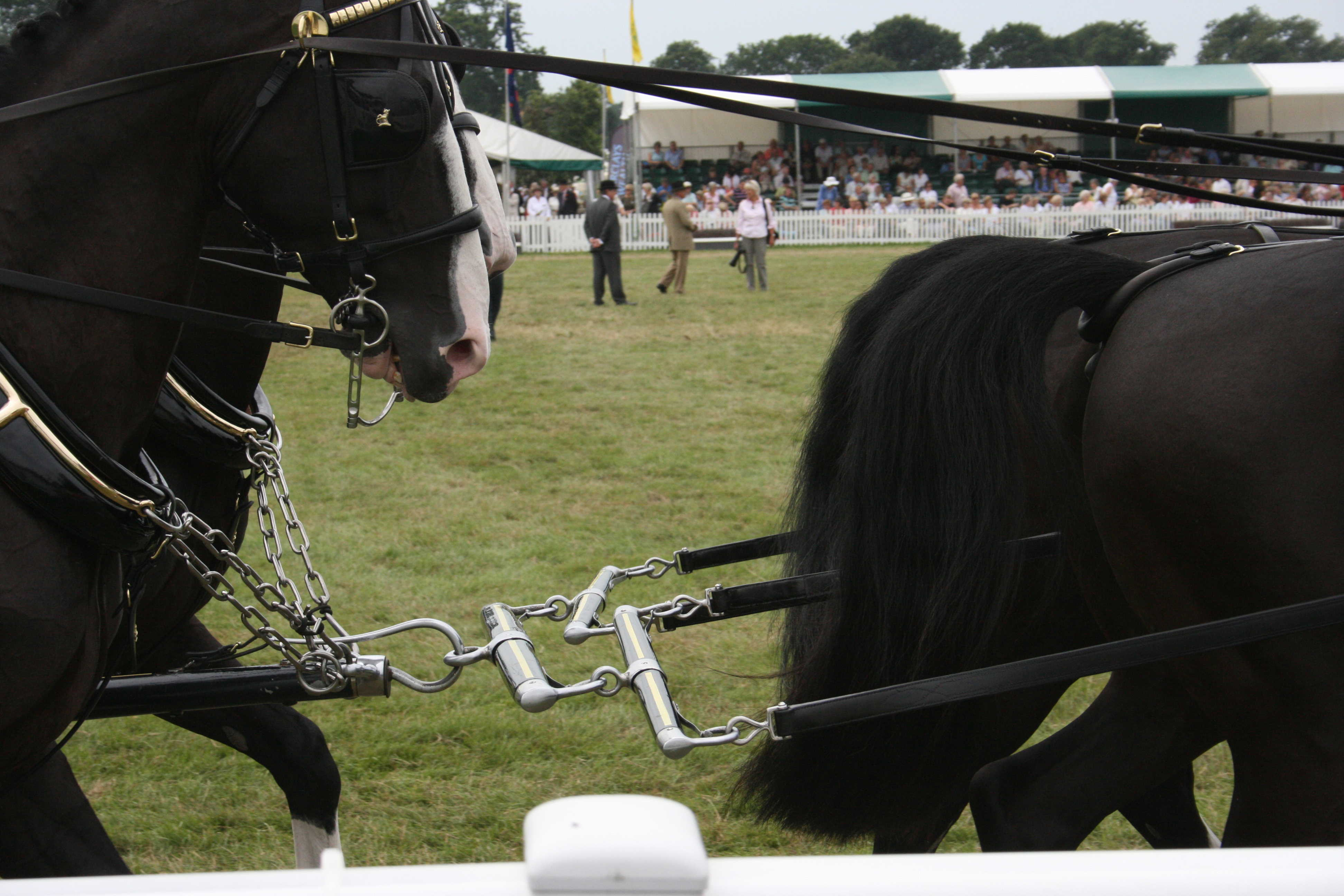
A set of whippletrees or leader-bars for the two leaders of a four-horse team

A whippletree, or whiffletree, is a mechanism to distribute force evenly through linkages. It is also referred to as an equalizer, leader bar, or double tree. It consists of a bar pivoted at or near the centre, with force applied from one direction to the pivot and from the other direction to the tips. Several whippletrees may be used in series to distribute the force further, such as to simulate pressure over an area as when applying loading to test airplane wings. Whippletrees may be used either in compression or tension. They were also used for subtraction and addition calculations in mechanical computers. Tension whippletrees are used in artful hung mobiles, such as those by artist Alexander Calder.

== Draught animals ==
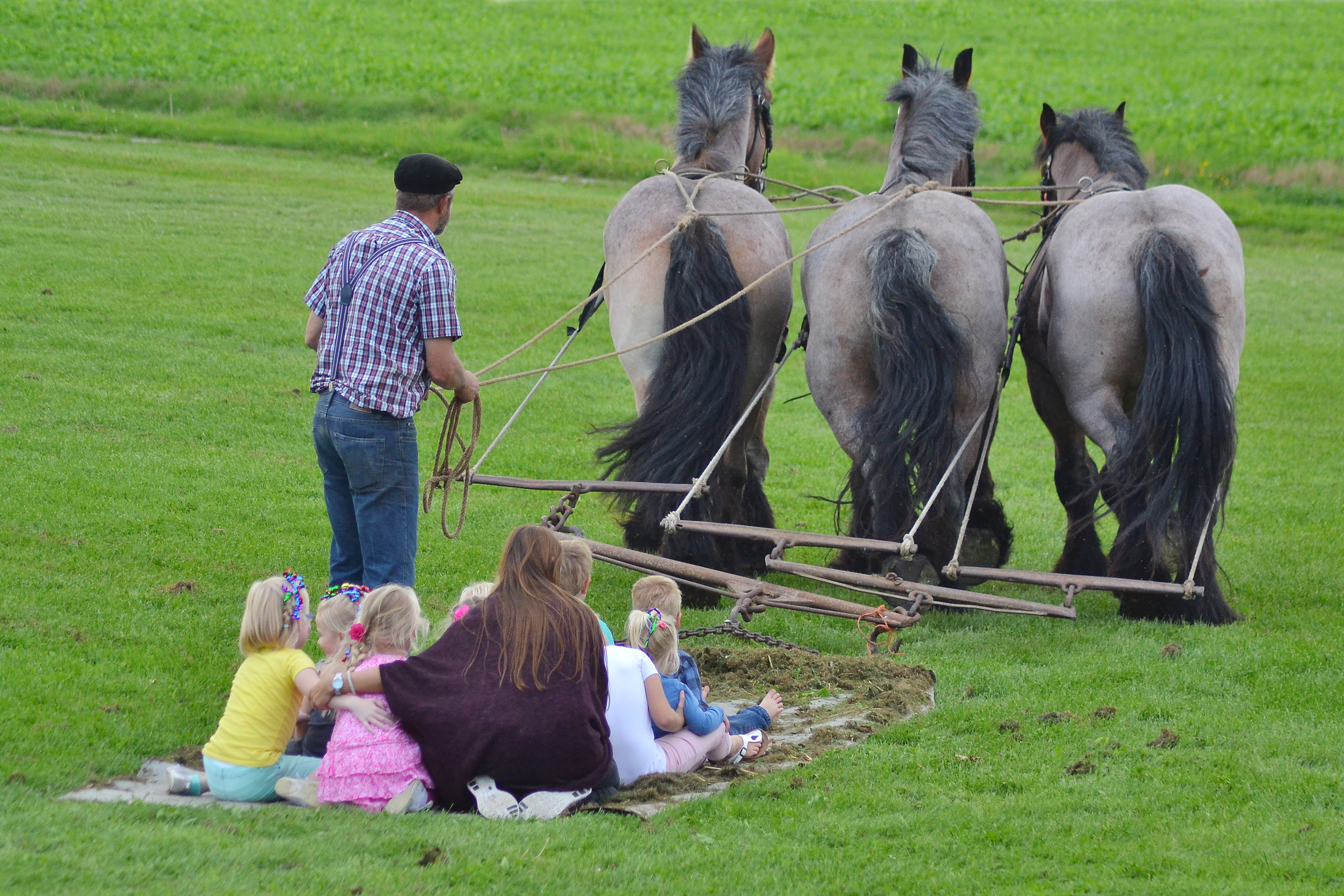
A diagram and photograph of a set of 5 whippletrees for a three-animal team

Whippletrees are used in tension to distribute forces from a point load to the traces of draught animals (the traces are the chains or straps on each side of the harness, on which the animal pulls). For these, the whippletree consists of a loose horizontal bar between the draught animal and its load. The centre of the bar is connected to the load, and the traces attach to its ends.

Whippletrees are used especially when pulling a dragged load such as a plough, harrow, log or canal boat or for pulling a vehicle (by the leaders in a team with more than one row of animals).

A swingletree, or singletree, is a special kind of whippletree used for a horse-drawn vehicle. The term swingletree is sometimes used for draught whippletrees.

A whippletree balances the pull from each side of the animal, preventing the load from tugging alternately on each side. It also keeps a point load from pulling the traces in onto the sides of the animal.

If several animals are used abreast, further whippletrees may be used behind the first. Thus, with two animals, each has its own whippletree, and a further one balances the loads from their two whippletrees—an arrangement sometimes known as a double-tree, or for the leaders in a larger team, leader-bars. With three or more animals abreast, even more whippletrees are needed; some may be made asymmetrical to balance odd numbers of animals. Multiple whippletrees balance the pulls from the different animals, ensuring that each takes an equal share of the work.

== Other examples ==
Whippletrees are also used in modern agriculture—for example, to link several ganged agricultural implements such as harrows, mowers or rollers to a tractor. This combines several small loads into a single load at the tractor hitch (the reverse of the use for draught animals).

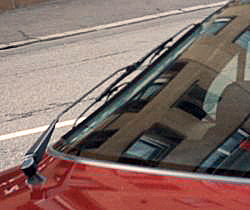
A standard automobile windscreen wiper uses whippletrees in compression to distribute the force of the wiper arm evenly across the blade.

A series of whippletrees is used in compression in a standard windshield wiper to distribute the point force of the sprung wiper arm evenly along the wiper blade.

Some designs for large telescopes use whippletrees to support the optical elements. The tree provides distributed mechanical support, reducing localised mechanical deflections, which in turn reduces optical distortion. Unlike the applications described above, which are two-dimensional, the whippletrees in telescope mirror support cells are three-dimensional designs, since the tree must support multiple points over an area.

Linkage-type mechanical analog computers use whippletree linkages to add and subtract quantities represented by straight-line motions. The illustration here of whippletrees for a three-animal team is very similar to a group of linkage adders and subtracters: "load" is the equivalent of the output sum/difference of the individual inputs. Inside the computer, cylinders on the knob shafts have thin metal tapes wrapped around them to convert rotary to linear motion.

One widely used application was in the IBM Selectric typewriter (and the IBM 2741 derived from it), where the linkages summed binary mechanical inputs to rotate and tilt the type ball. This type of computing method was also used for naval gunnery, such as the Mark 56 Gun Fire Control System and sonar fire-control systems.

== See also ==
- Boat trailer, which uses this mechanism to evenly distribute force across the hull of the boats it carries.
- Differential (mechanical device), which does for torque what each layer of a whippletree does for force.
- Gresley conjugated valve gear
- Mobile (sculpture), similar principles applied in art.
- Paraglider wing, in which a load is distributed by multiple strings, but without rigid elements.
- PLate OPtimizer, CAD program for distribution of whippletree support elements in telescope mirror cell design
- Proteus (WAM-V), catamaran with whippletree suspension
- Rocker-bogie, the whippletree applied to Mars rover suspension.
- Swingletree
