= Horse harness =

Device that connects a horse to a carriage or load

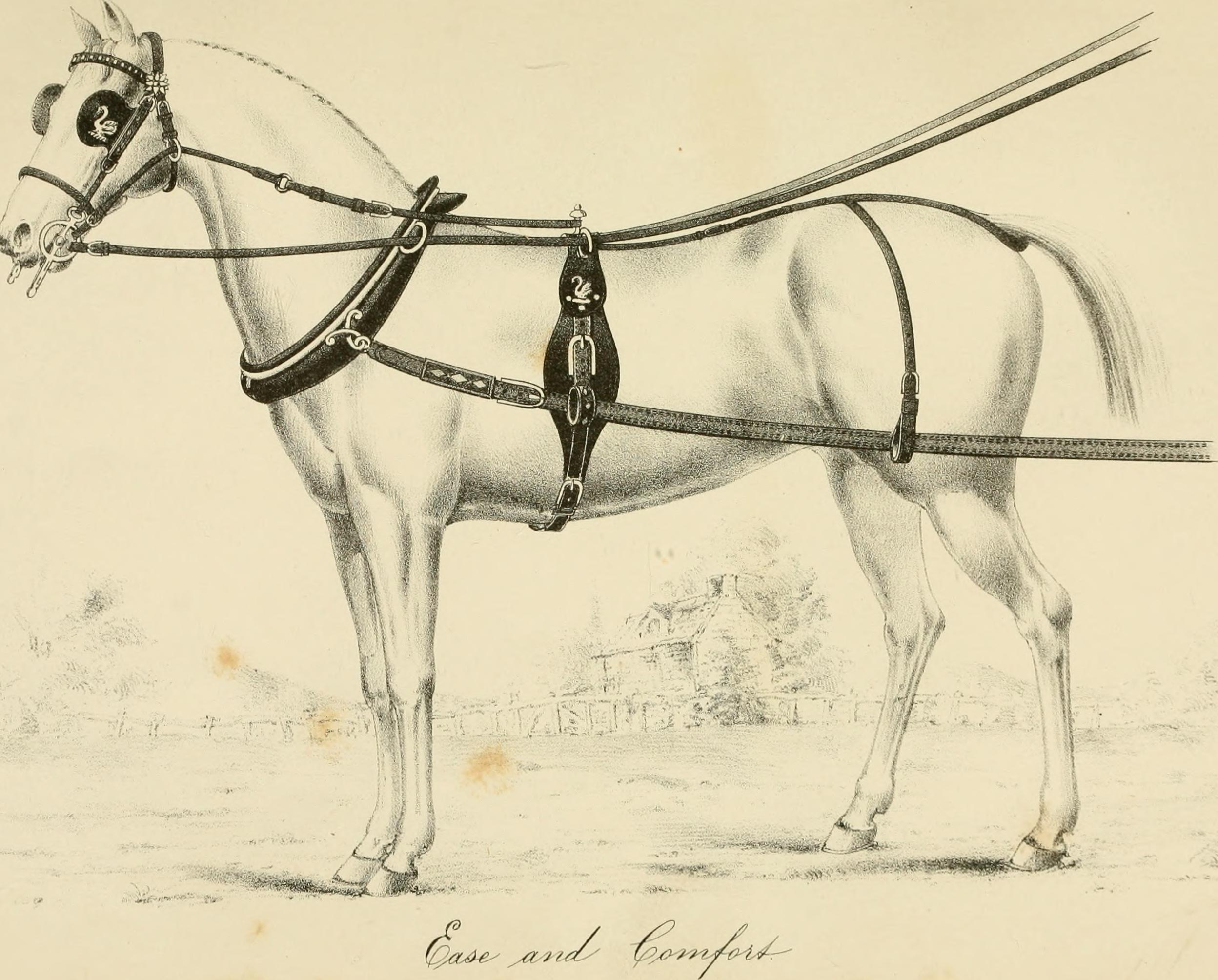
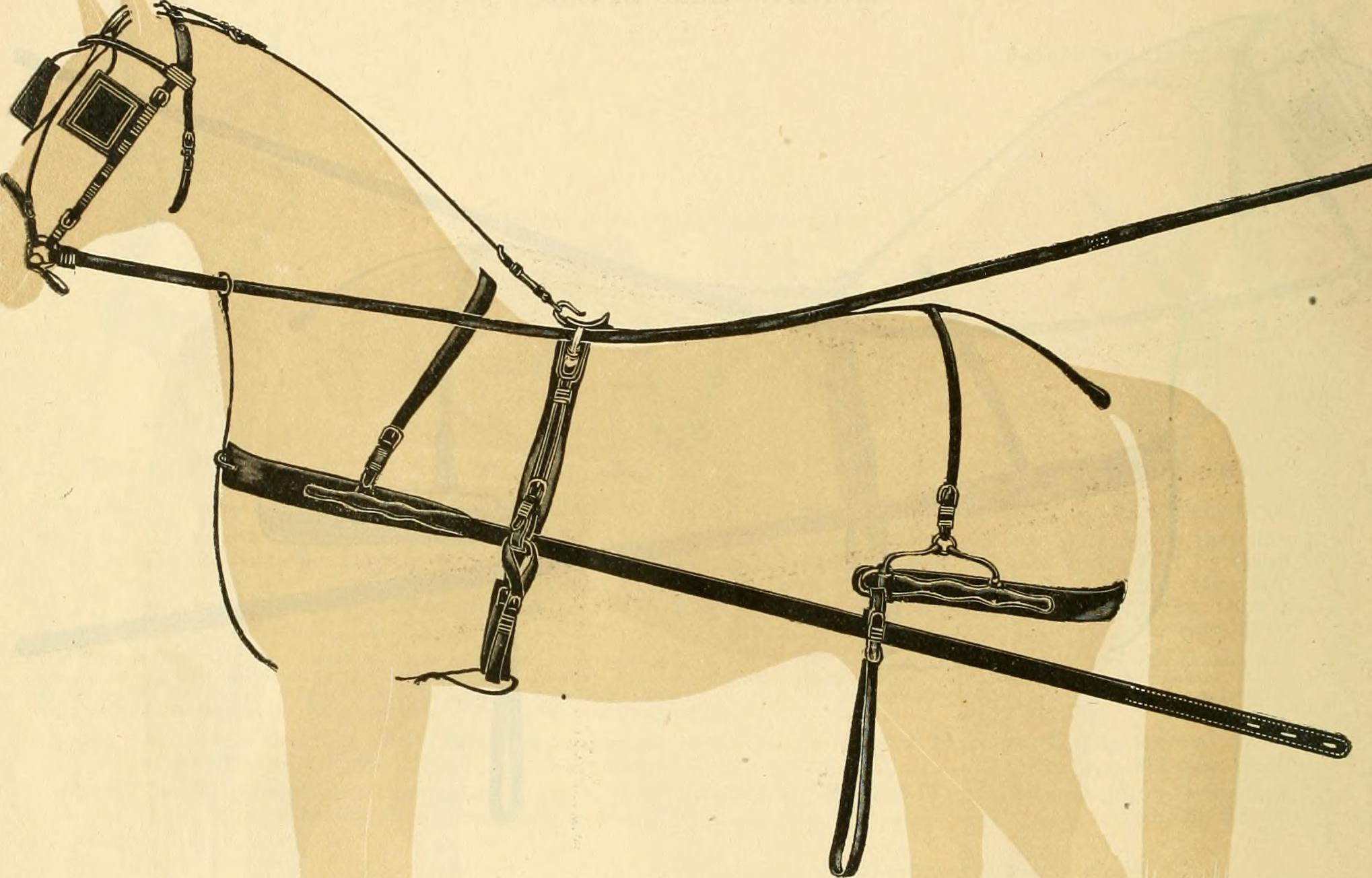
Full collar harness (top), breast collar harness (bottom)

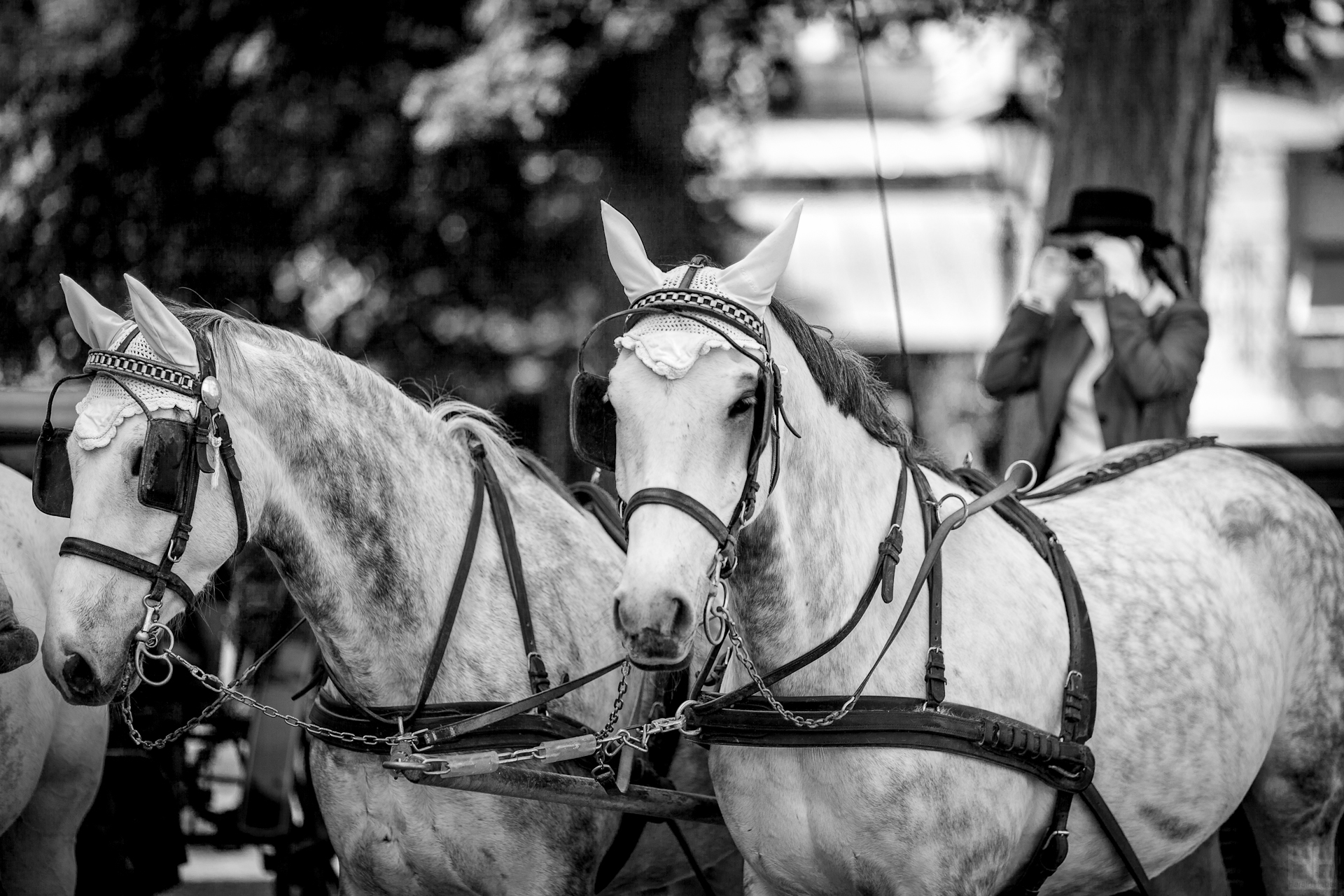
Harnesses from the front

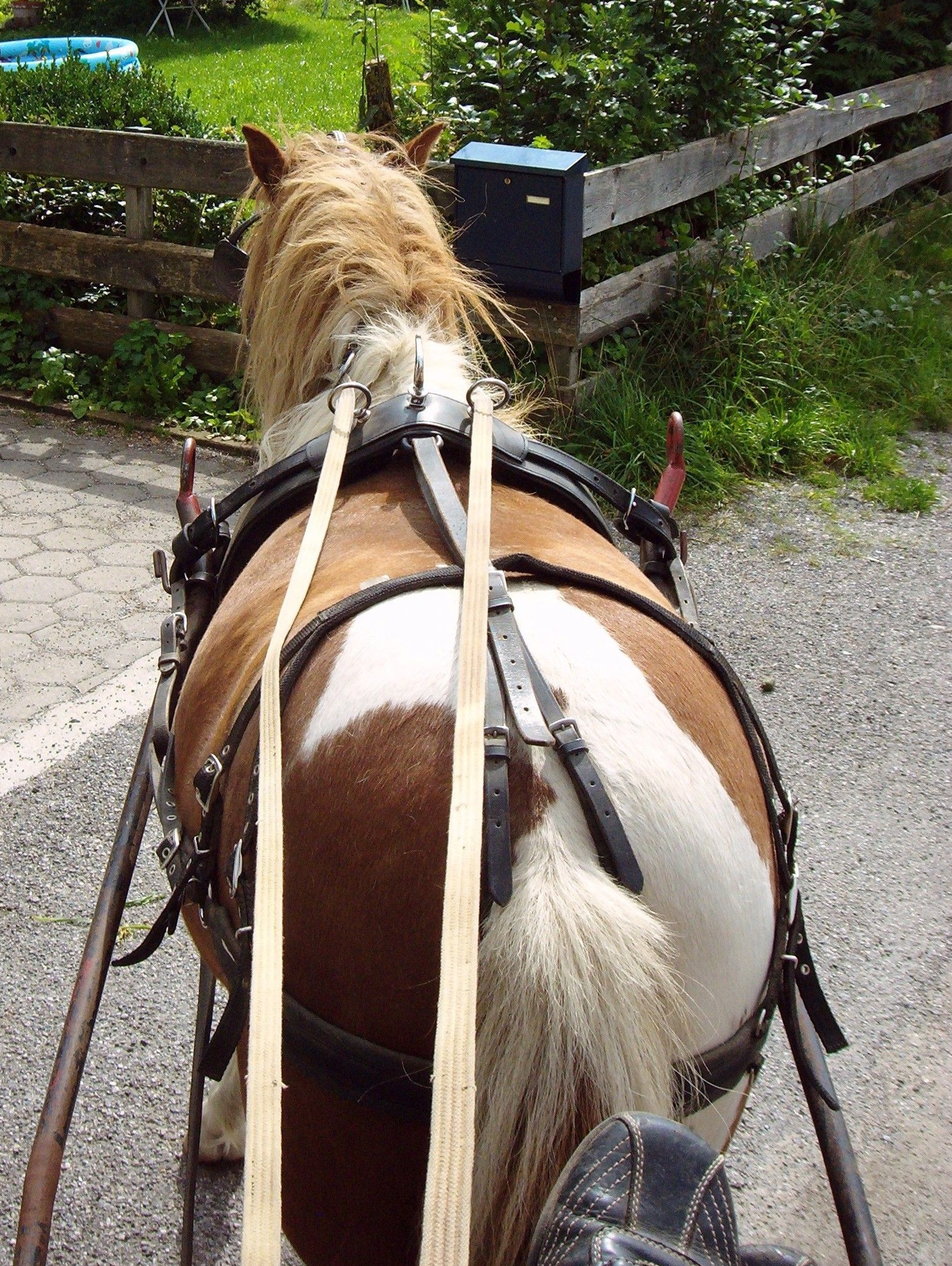
View of harness from above-rear

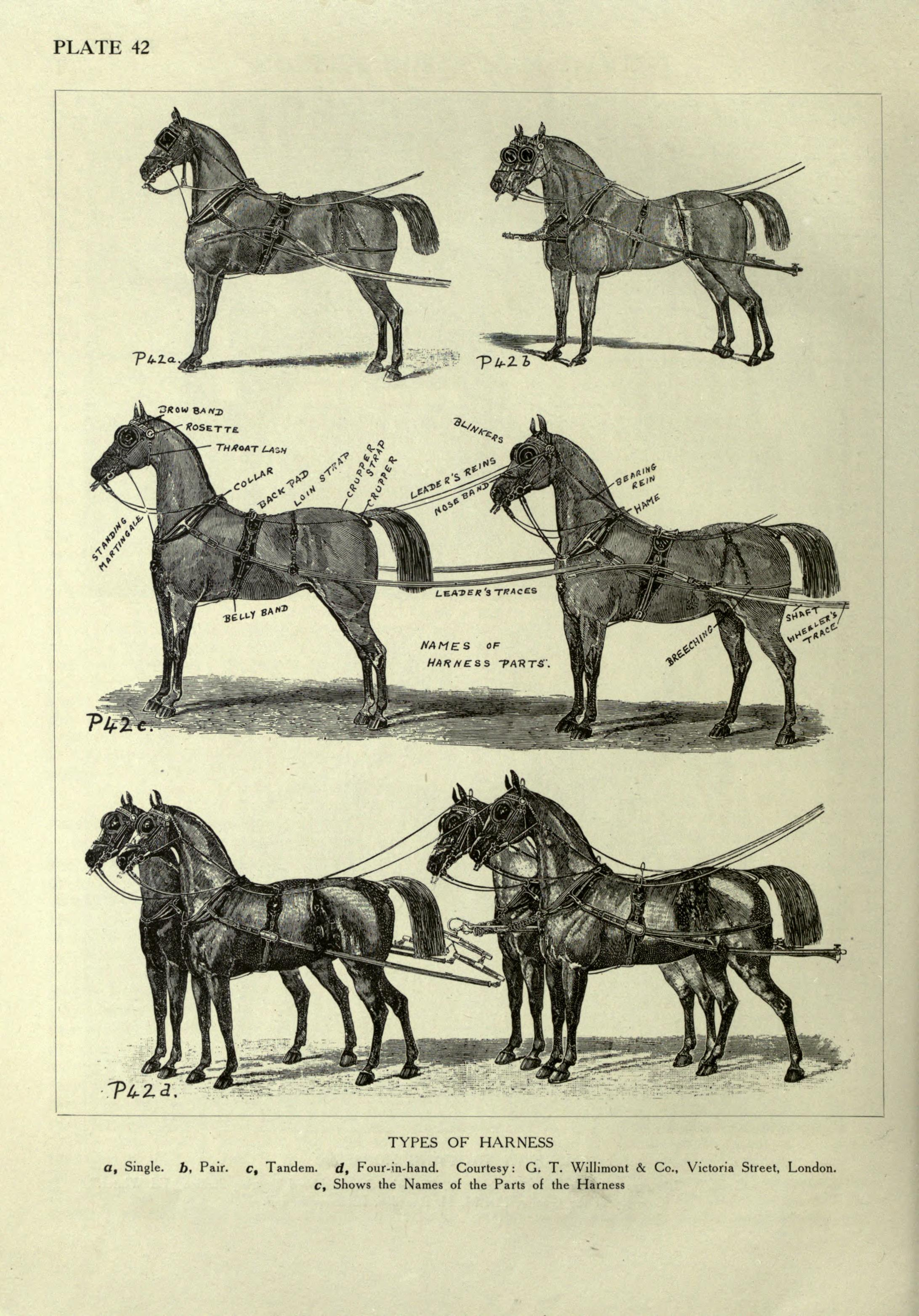
Horse harness for a single, pair, tandem, and four-in-hand

A horse harness is a device that connects a horse to a horse-drawn vehicle or another type of load to pull. The two main designs of horse harness are the breast collar and the full collar. The trade that makes harnesses is a saddler or harness maker.

For pulling heavy loads, a full collar is required because it distributes pressure over a larger area of the horse. An ill-fitting full collar can cause chafing on the horse's skin and can interfere with its breathing, as can a breast collar that is positioned too high.

Putting harness on a horse is called harnessing or harnessing up. Attaching the harness to the vehicle or load is called putting to in the British Isles, or hitching in North America. The order of putting on harness components varies by discipline, but when a horse collar is used, it is usually put on first.

Harness components designed for other animals (such as the yoke used with oxen) are not suitable for horses and will not allow the horse to work efficiently.

== History ==
Early horse-drawn vehicles were limited by simple throat-and-girth harnesses, which restricted a horse's breathing and reduced the amount of weight it could pull. Over time, new harness designs were developed to improve efficiency and allow horses to pull heavier loads. In ancient China, innovations such as the breast strap and improved yoke arrangements allowed horses to work more effectively in front of carts and chariots. By the early medieval period, the invention of the rigid horse collar transformed traction by distributing weight across the horse's shoulders rather than its neck, greatly increasing pulling power. These improvements in harness design supported the development of heavier vehicles, expanded agricultural and commercial transport, and contributed to the widespread use of horse-drawn equipment throughout Europe and Asia.

== Parts ==
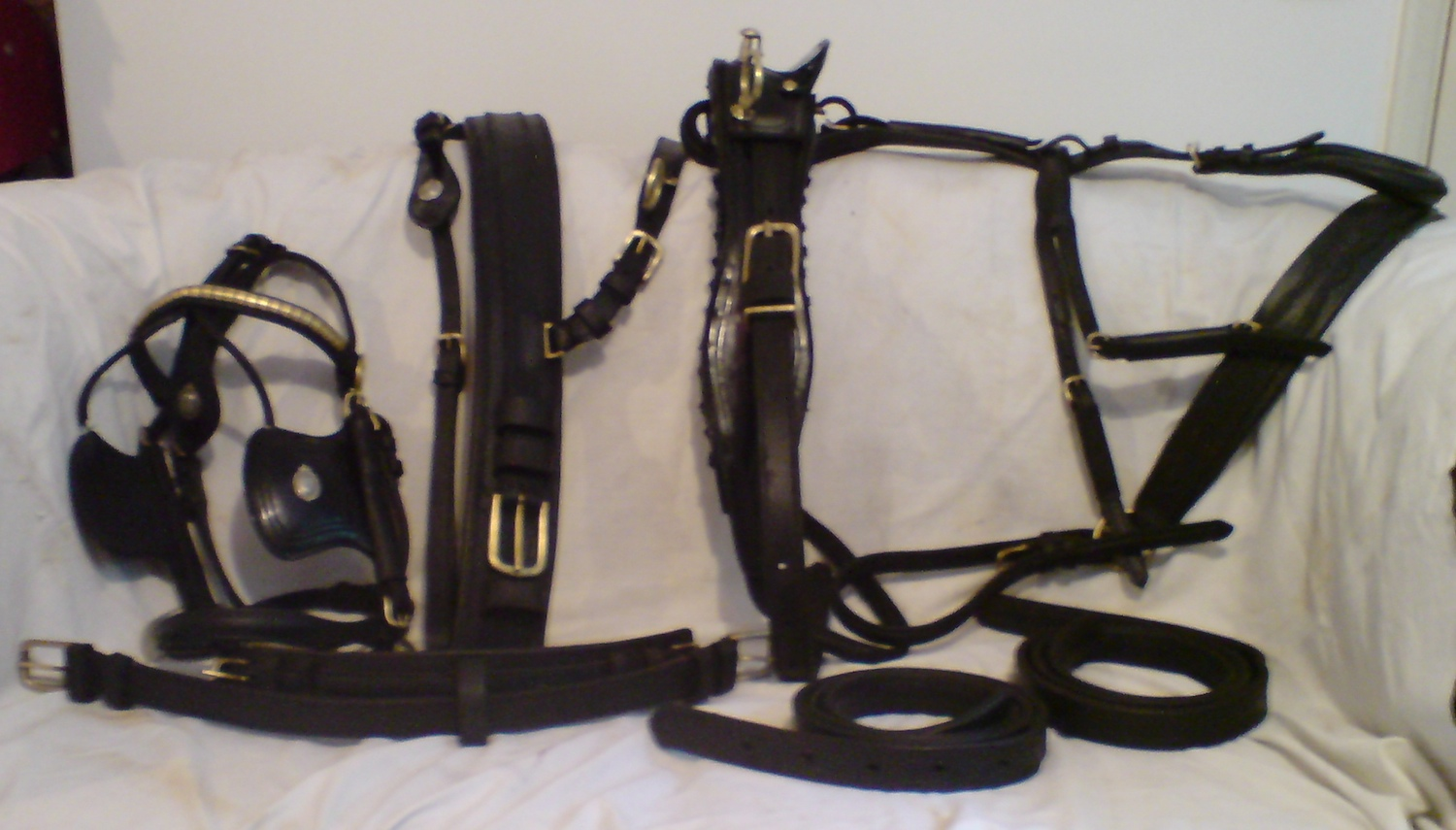
Complete breast collar harness and bridle, laid out

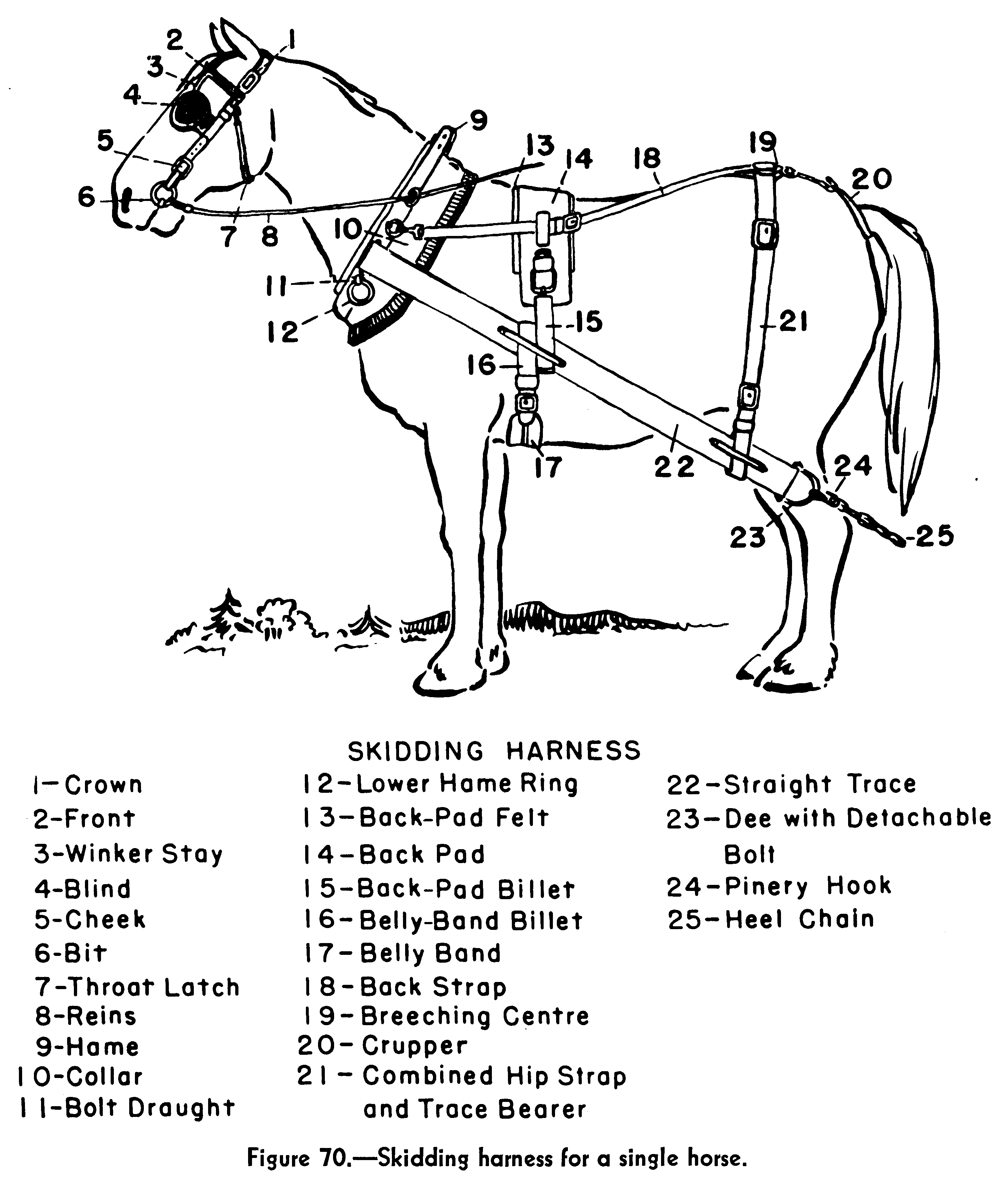
Elements of a skidding harness

Different regions and different purposes cause variation in harness construction, however there are many parts of harness that are common.

=== Pulling the load ===
The collar and traces are responsible for pulling the load. The rest of the harness is for keeping the harness in position, holding the vehicle or load, and controlling the horse.

==== Collar ====
A collar is the part which a horse pushes against with its shoulders and chest. The two main designs are the breast collar harness and the full collar harness.

- A horse collar (or full collar) is a padded loop fitting closely around the horse's neck and resting on its shoulders. Must be correctly sized for each individual horse. Used for heavier pulling than a breast collar.
- A breast collar is a padded strap running across the front of the horse's chest in lieu of a full collar. Breastcollars do not require close fitting for each horse. They should be used with a swingletree at the carriage to avoid rubbing the horse's shoulders during movement.
- Hames are required when a full collar is used. Hames are two metal or wooden strips which take the full force of the pull, padded by the collar. They are strapped on after putting the collar on the horse.

==== Traces ====
Traces are the two straps or chains which take the pull from the breast collar or hames to the vehicle or load.

=== Head section ===
The head section of a harness includes the bridle and bit, reins to control the horse, and other controlling straps.

==== Bridle ====
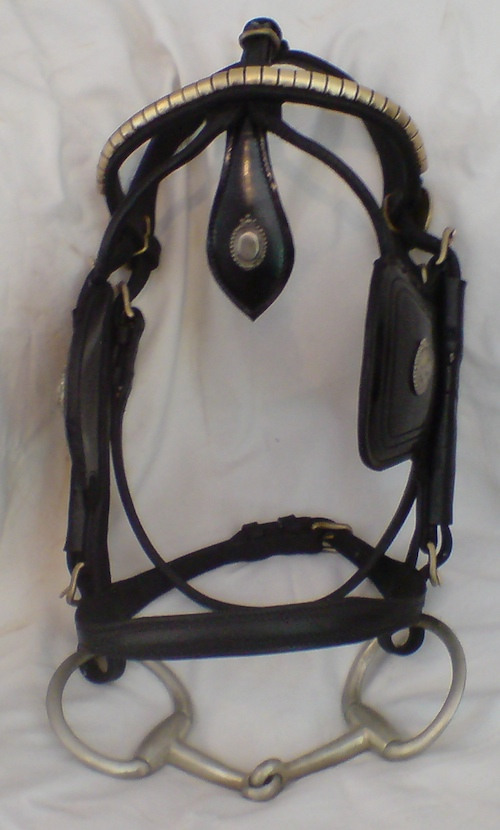
Harness bridle

Harness bridles are slightly different than riding bridles. They usually include blinders, also called blinkers or winkers, beside a horse's eyes to prevent it from being distracted or frightened by the carriage or other activity behind or beside it. When there are horses harnessed in front of another, all those behind the leader will have large rings mounted on the side of the bridle to support reins passing to a horse in front of them. Often there is ornamentation on the bridle such as a drop hanging from the crownpiece and down the forehead, rosettes on each side by the ears, and decoration across the browband.

==== Bit ====
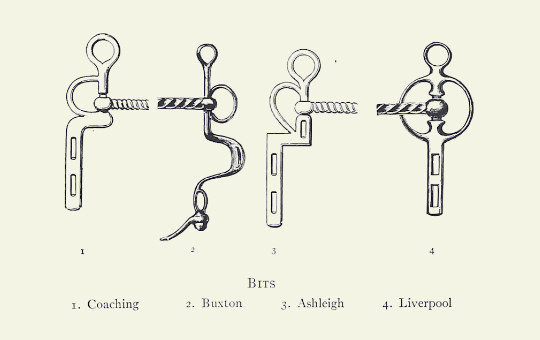
Driving bits

Bits for harness may be similar to those used for riding, but there are a few bits unique to driving such as the Elbow, Buxton, Liverpool, and the Wilson snaffle. The first three offer adjustments in severity for each horse, which is useful when working with multiple horses where all the horses wear matching bits, but the adjustments in curb leverage allow for each individual horse's needs.

==== Reins ====
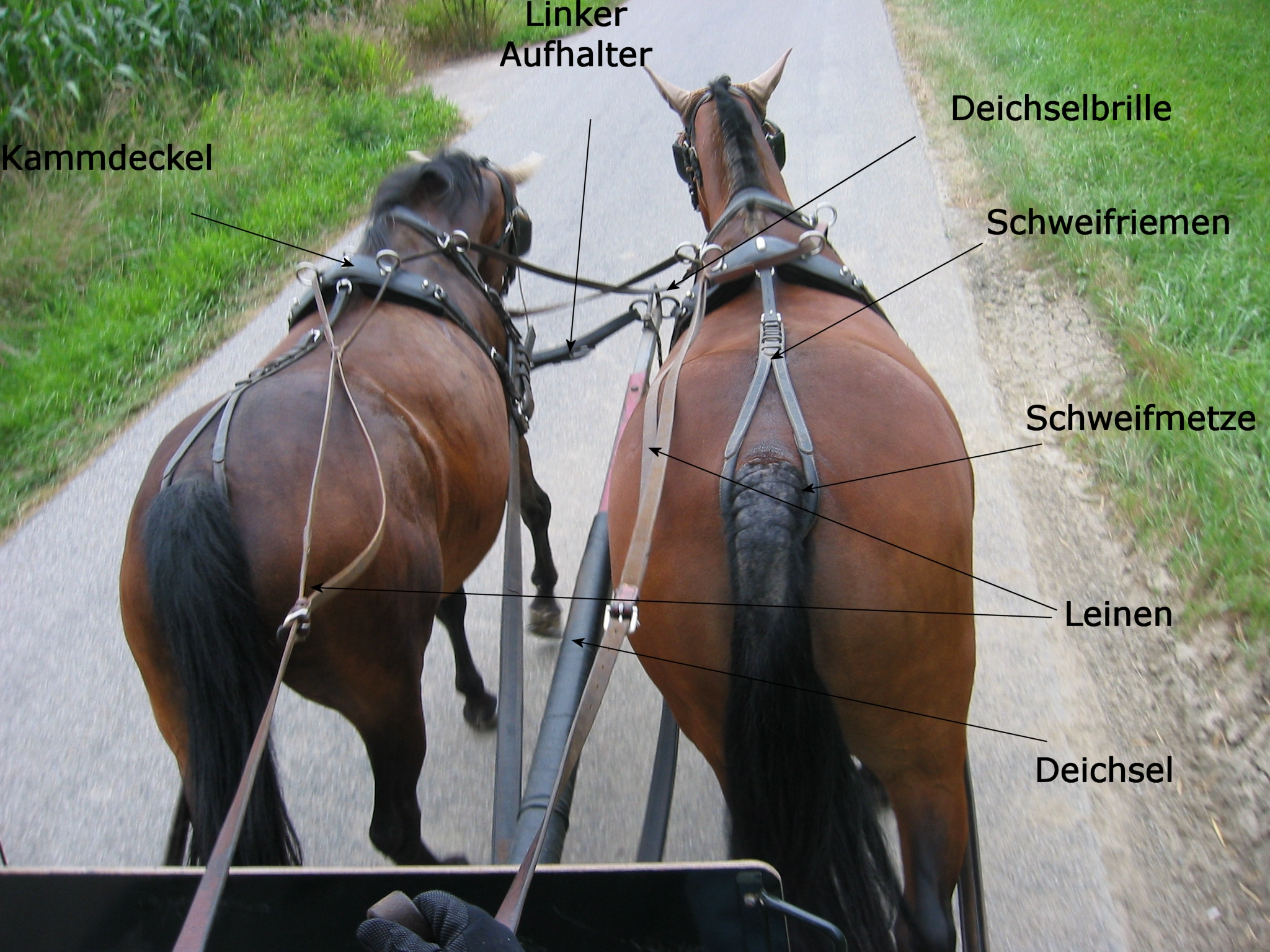
Shows crossed and joined reins of a pair

Reins or lines are long leather straps (occasionally ropes) running from the bit to the driver's hands which are used to guide the horses. For a single horse, there are two reins (left and right). For a pair of horses harnessed side-by-side, the reins from each horse are joined midway so the driver holds just two reins. When driving teams of four or more horses (multiple "pairs"), each pair of horses ends with two reins at the driver—so a four-in-hand driver holds four reins. In some driving systems, the reins of teams of multiple horses are all joined together so the driver only holds two reins. Reins are often 13 feet long or more. A lead rein—a rein that passes a rear horse to reach a horse in front of it—may well be 24 feet long. Driving reins were traditionally russet (undyed brown leather) because the dye used to color harness black would rub off on the driver's clothes where the reins draped across their lap.

==== Bearing rein ====
A bearing rein or overcheck is a strap system which attaches to the harness saddle, goes to the top of the horse's head and downward to attach to a bit. In English carriage harness, a bearing rein or side check travels through rings near the horse's ears and attaches to the bit. Common in harness racing and in fine harness showing, an overcheck strap passes between the horse's ears, comes down the front of the face, splits and attaches to a small auxiliary bit. Overchecks are sometimes used to attain a high head carriage; extremely high settings are considered abusive. Properly adjusted bearing reins and overchecks give the horse ample freedom of his head while prohibiting a horse from reaching to eat grass or scratching sweaty bridles on anything within reach—potentially causing accidents when a bit or rein gets hooked on something. The primary names of these straps are bearing rein and side check (UK), overcheck (USA), but also check rein, overhead check, and overdraw.

==== Martingale ====
In some cases a specially designed running martingale may also be added. A looser overcheck may also be used in a working harness to prevent the horse grazing. The overcheck hooks to a pedestal on the harness saddle.

==== Horse brasses ====
Horse brasses are ornamental brass plaques mounted on leather straps, used for decoration, especially on working harness. Made in a wide range of designs.

=== Mid-section ===
The middle section of a harness includes the parts that go around the horse's mid-section and hold shafts. Most all the other parts of the harness attach to this stable part of the harness.

==== Saddle ====
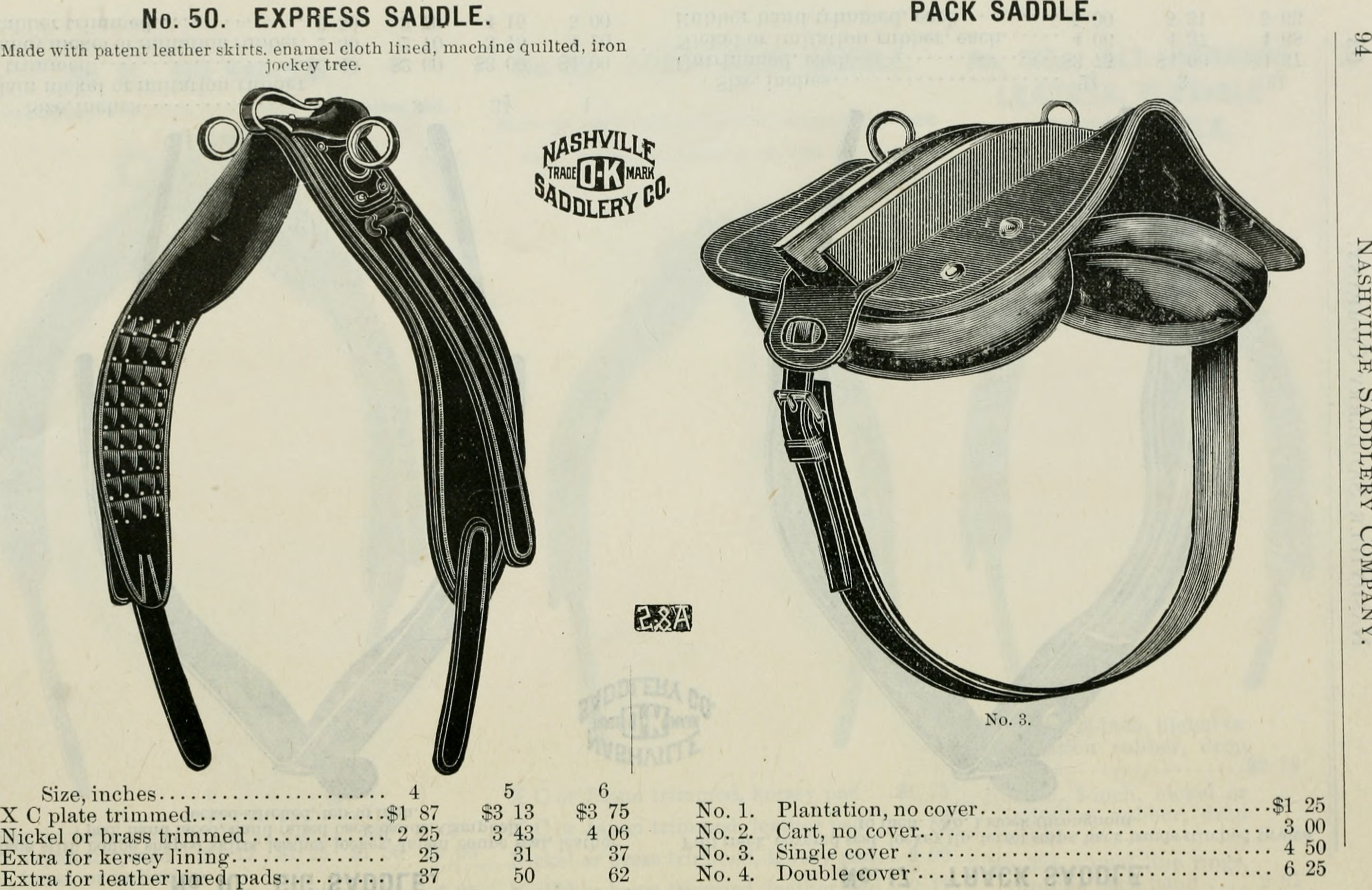
Carriage harness saddle (left); heavy-cart saddle (right)

A harness saddle or pad is the piece of the harness that lies across the horse's back. It is not the same as a riding saddle. A saddle is a stuffed piece of leather that supports the weight of shafts. Saddles for heavy commercial carts may be quite substantial in size to help distribute the weight bearing down from the shafts. For pulling loads without shafts, a pad or back pad is used, which is a wide non-padded leather strap. For example, pads are used for logging, plowing or a pair of horses pulling a 4-wheeled vehicle which uses a pole between two horses, not shafts.

A fitted and stuffed saddle pad may be placed underneath a saddle or pad for extra padding. The saddle is held into place by the girth, a strap which goes under the belly of the horse. Together, the saddle and girth encircle the horse. Attached to the saddle are other parts of the harness such as rein terrets (above), tugs (to each side), a back strap and crupper (to the rear), and bearing reins or overcheck (to the front).

==== Girth ====
The girth is a strap that goes under the horse's belly and is buckled firmly to the saddle. A surcingle is a term used within certain fine harness designs to describe the combination of a light girth and harness saddle.

==== Shaft tugs, or tugs ====
Loops attached to the back band to hold up the shafts of a vehicle in van or fine harness (not needed in cart harness, which attaches to hooks on the shafts). Two types:

- For two-wheeled vehicles the tugs are stiff leather loops, fitting fairly loosely around the shafts (which are rigidly attached to the vehicle), to allow flexibility as the animal and the vehicle move against each other.
- For four-wheeled vehicles with independently hinged shafts, the tugs (Tilbury tugs) are leather straps buckled tightly around the shafts so they move with the animal.

==== Back band ====
A strap going through the harness saddle, or attached to it, to join the belly band on both sides of the horse. It takes the weight of the shafts. In heavy cart harness it is replaced by a chain running in a groove in the harness saddle, hooked to the shafts either side.

- Sliding back band. In a two-wheeled vehicle, the shafts are fixed to the vehicle to hold it level. On a side-slope, one shaft will be higher than the other, and in this case the back band is normally allowed to slide sideways through the harness saddle, so the horse can walk upright without strain on the harness.
- Fixed back-band. In a four-wheeled vehicle, the shafts or pole must be allowed to hinge up and down, to allow the horse and vehicle to pass over hillocks and dips. Often the shafts are independently hinged, and on a side-slope these will each hinge to follow the horse, and a sliding back band is not needed. However, if a sliding back band was used with independent shafts it might allow one shaft to ride up higher than the other, and so for such shafts the back-band is normally fixed to the harness saddle. On other four-wheeled vehicles, the two shafts hinge together, and a sliding back band is needed as for two-wheeled vehicles.

==== Belly band ====
A strap that goes over the girth, but more loosely under the belly of the horse. It prevents the shafts from rising up, especially on a two-wheeled vehicle where weight on the rear of the cart may tip the front up.

==== False martingale ====
A strap passing between the front legs, from the bottom centre of the collar to the belly band, to hold the collar in position. Called "false", because unlike a true martingale it does not attach to the bridle or have any influence on the horse's action.

==== Terrets ====
Terrets are metal loops through which reins pass. Terrets are mounted on the saddle or collar to support the reins and keep them in position. Where one horse is hitched in front of another, the rear horse's harness may have extra terrets through which are run the lines to the horse ahead of them. There may be terrets attached near the rear horse's ears, called Roger rings, or double rings on the saddle to separate the lines for the rear horse from the lines to the forward horse or horses.

=== Rear section ===
The purpose of the rear section of harness is for holding the traces (the pulling straps) up off the ground so a horse doesn't get a leg over one, and for the horse to slow or stop a wheeled vehicle, or "hold back" the vehicle against gravity when going downhill.

==== Breeching ====
Breeching is a horizontal strap that goes around the horse's haunches allowing the horse to slow a vehicle or hold it back when going downhill. It is usually hooked to the breeching dee on the shafts by breeching straps. Used for a single horse, a pair, or in a larger team, only for the wheelers (the animal or pair closest to the vehicle). The leaders in a team do not have breeching, as they are in front of the shafts or pole and cannot help to slow the vehicle. Breeching may be omitted for vehicles with efficient brakes or when pulling very light vehicles such as in fine harness driving.

==== Crupper ====
A crupper is a soft padded loop which goes under the base of the tail and is attached to the back strap, which runs across the back and is attached to the top-rear of the saddle. The back strap and crupper together keep the saddle from slipping forward.

==== Back strap ====
A strap running from the crupper to the rear of the saddle or pad. The back strap and crupper together keep the saddle from slipping forward. The back strap also holds in position any loin straps or breeching straps.

== Types ==
=== Show harness ===
Show harnesses for light cart driving have a breast collar instead of a horse collar and are made with strong but refined-looking leather throughout, usually black and highly polished. In draft horse showing and combined driving, horse collars are seen, but harness leather is still highly polished and well-finished.

=== Carriage or van harness ===
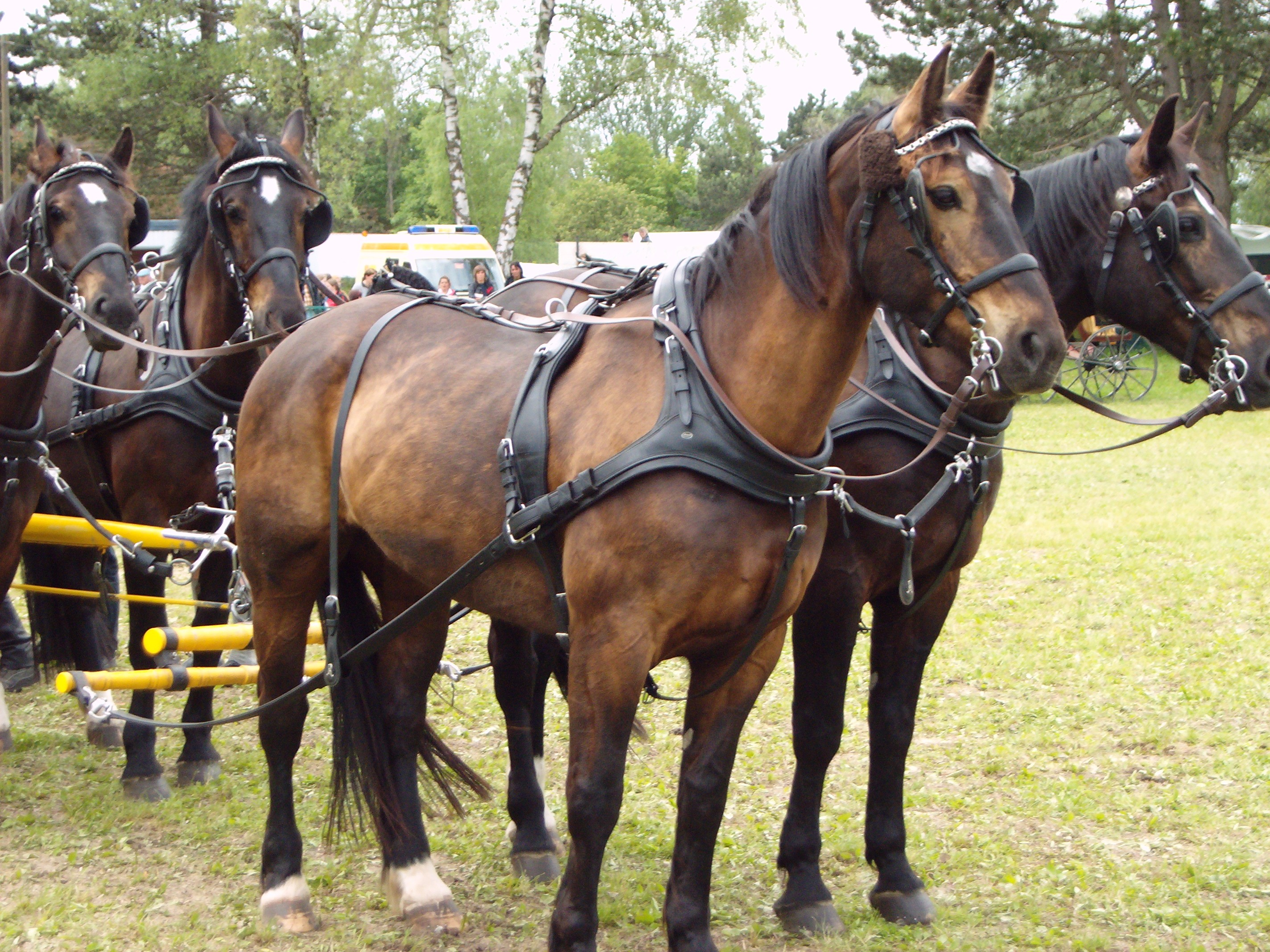
A combined driving team in carriage harness

Lighter weight but strong harness similar to show harness, used for pulling passenger vehicles such as buggies or carts, or other lighter loads. The traces attach either to the shafts of the vehicle or to the vehicle itself, and the harness may have either a horse collar or a breast collar.

=== Racing harness ===
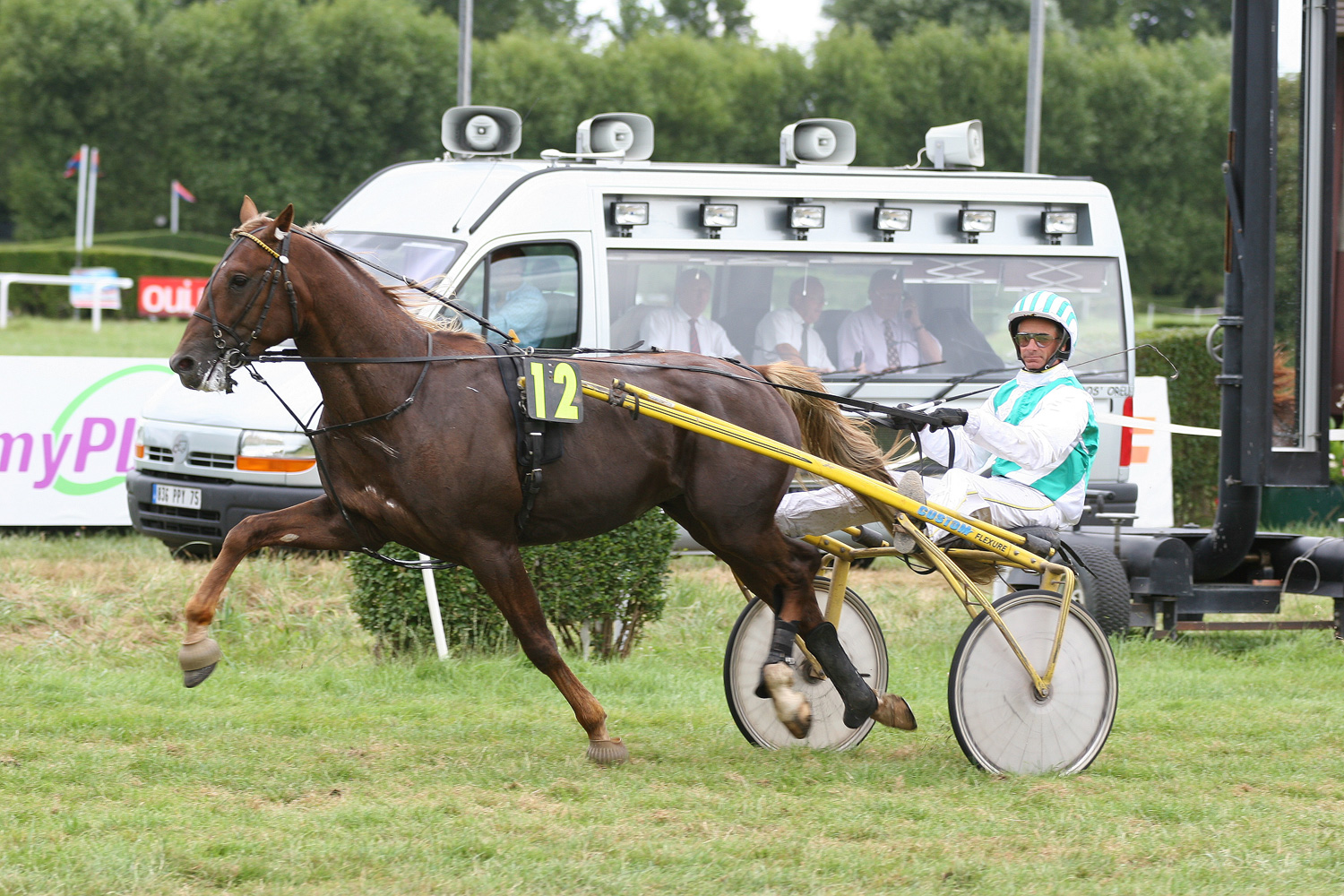
Racing harness

The racing harness, like the show harness, is a breast collar harness. Horses are hitched to a very lightweight two-wheeled cart, called a sulky. Most race harnesses incorporate a standing martingale and an overcheck. Horses may be raced in a "blind" bridle, which restricts the horse from seeing beside and behind him to various degrees by use of blinkers (horse tack), or may be raced with an "open" bridle, one that does not have blinkers. Specialized equipment, called "hobbles" or "hopples" are added to the harness of race horses who pace (and sometimes to the harness of those who trot) in order to help them maintain their gait.

=== Cart or wagon harness ===
Harness for pulling heavier vehicles always has a horse collar. The traces are often made of chain and attach to loops on the shafts of the vehicle. A chain attached to the shafts may be passed over the saddle to carry their weight. Reins are of rope or leather, depending on region of the world.

=== Plow harness ===
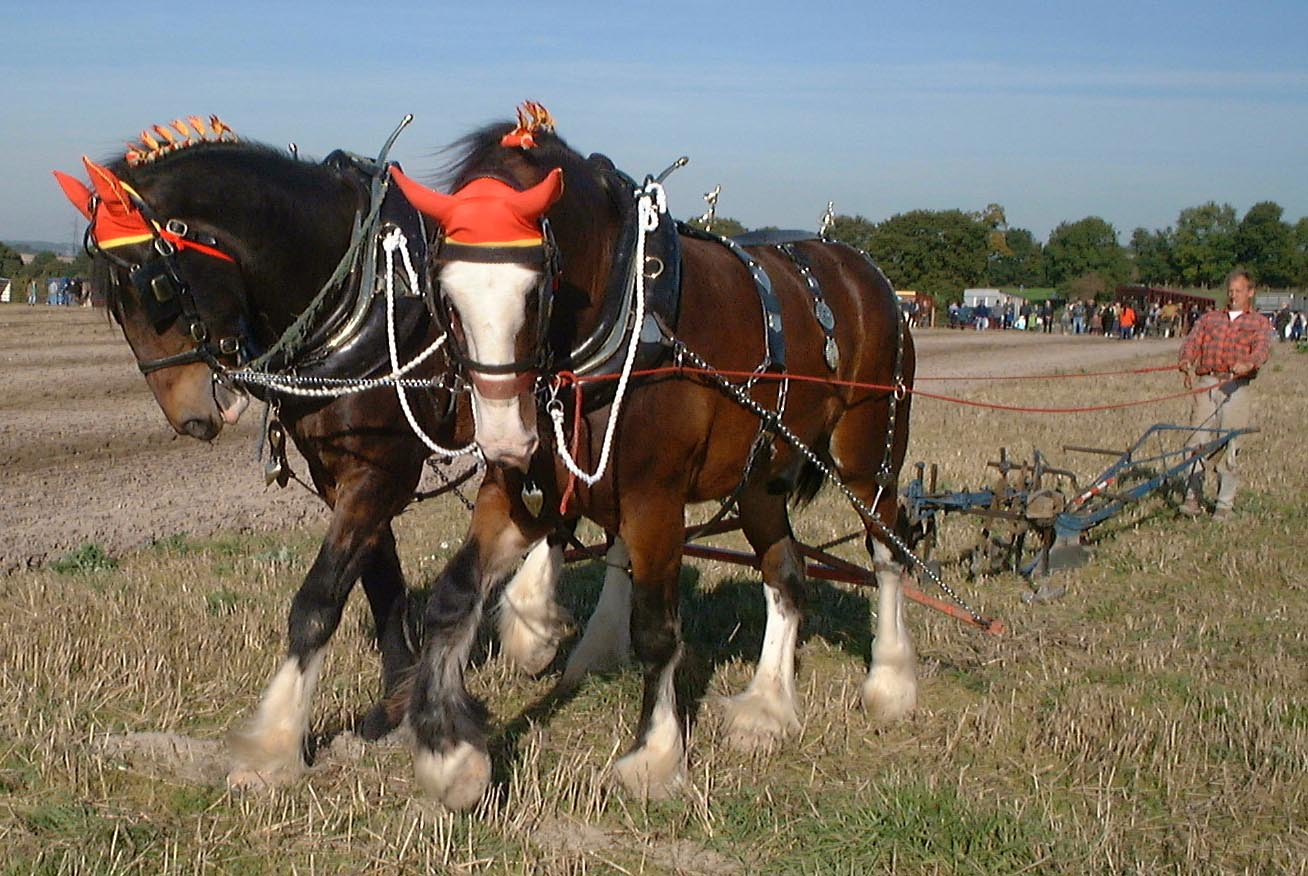
Plow Harness

Similar to wagon harness but without breeching, used for dragged loads such as plows, harrows, canal boats or logs. This style is also used on the leaders in a team of animals pulling a vehicle. The traces attach to a whippletree behind the horse and this then pulls the load (or in larger teams may attach to further whippletrees).

There are two main plow harness types: the New England D-Ring and the Western harness. The New England D-Ring makes use of a metal D-shaped ring that allows for a ninety degree angle to be maintained at the junction of the front trace and the hames regardless of the height of the implement being pulled. The Western harness does not provide this flexibility but has other useful characteristics such as a strap that runs from the breeching to the collar which stops the pull from riding up and hitting the horses in the face when descending a steep incline.

== Gallery ==
Carriage horse harnesses

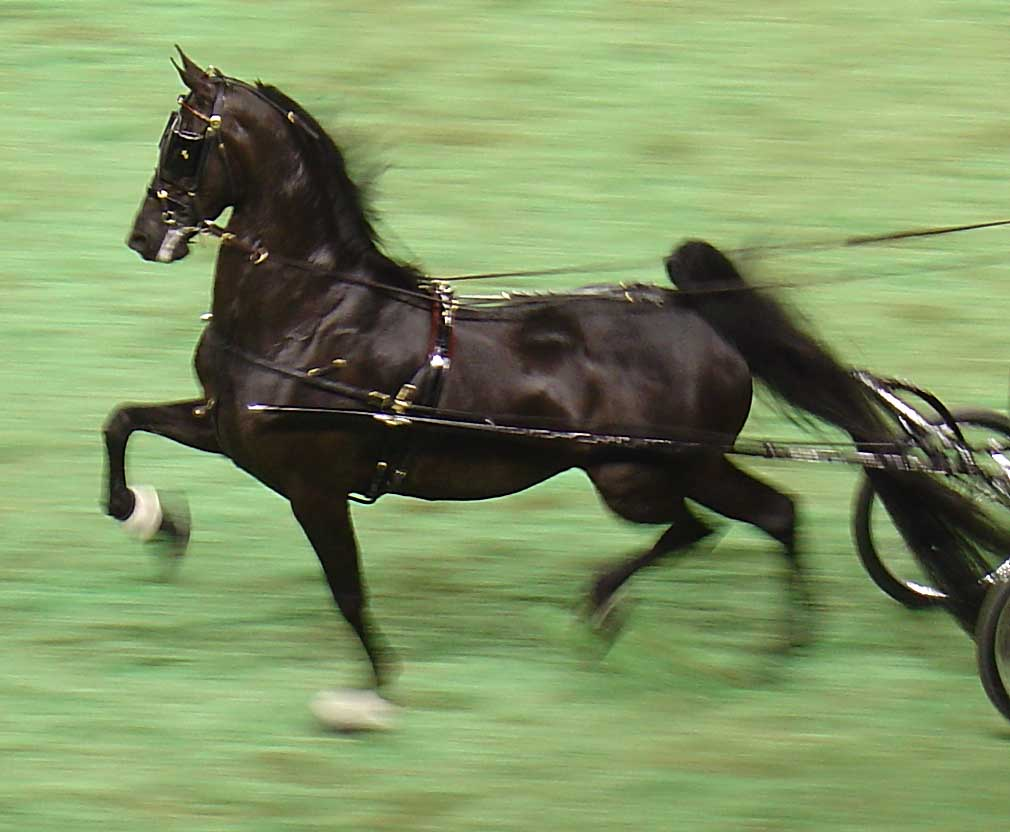
Fine show harness

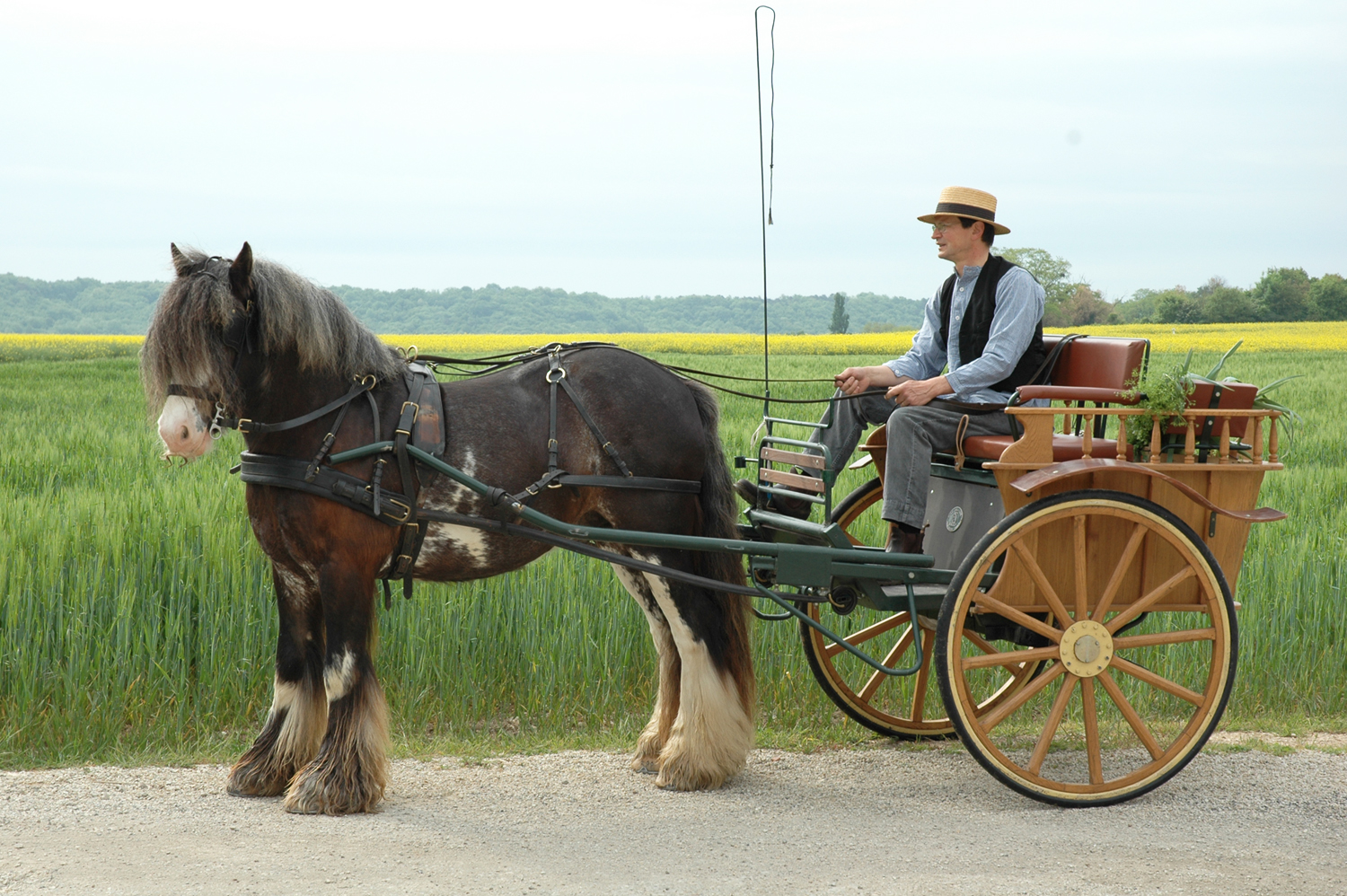
Sporting breast collar harness

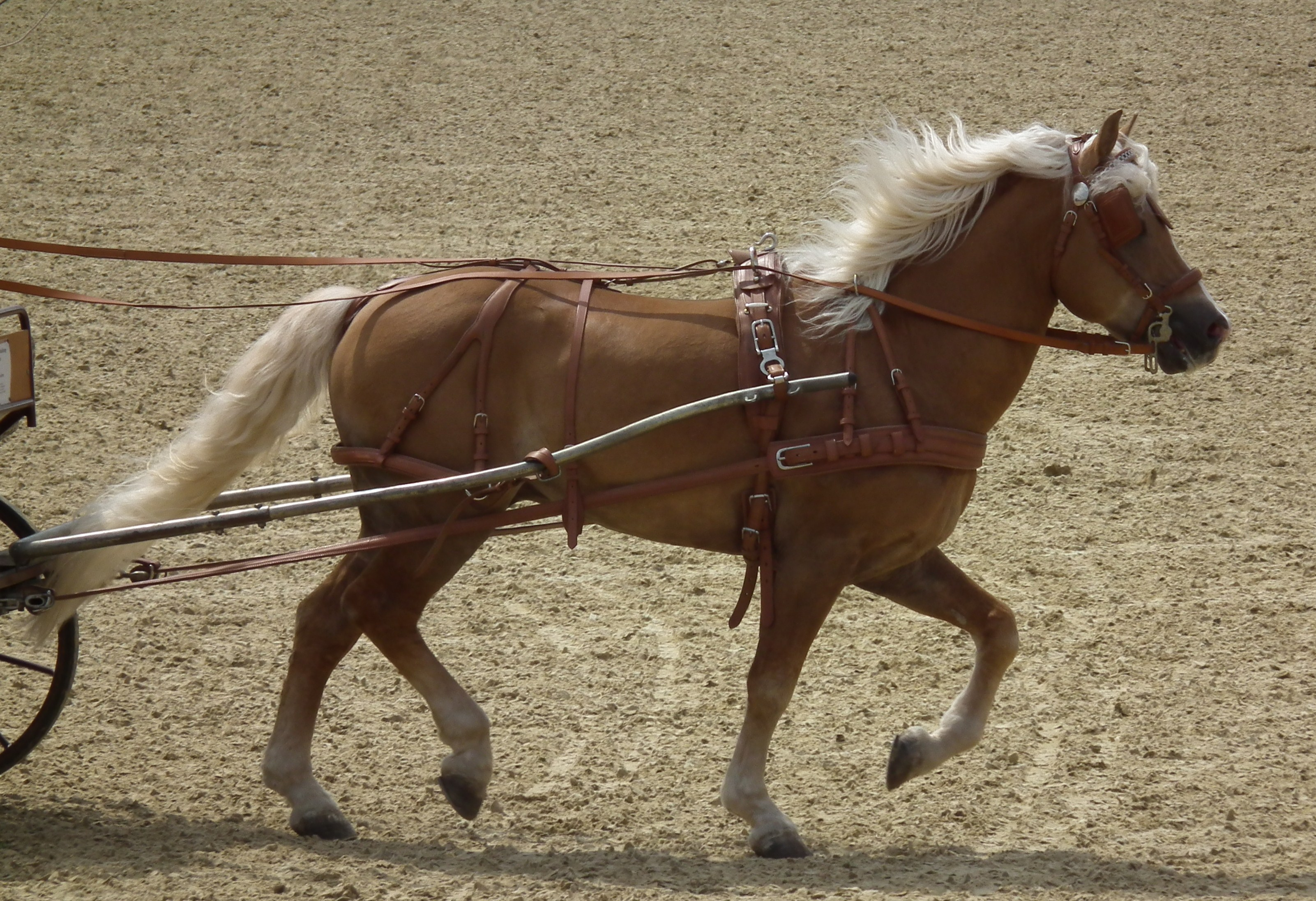
Russet colored harness
Work horse harnesses

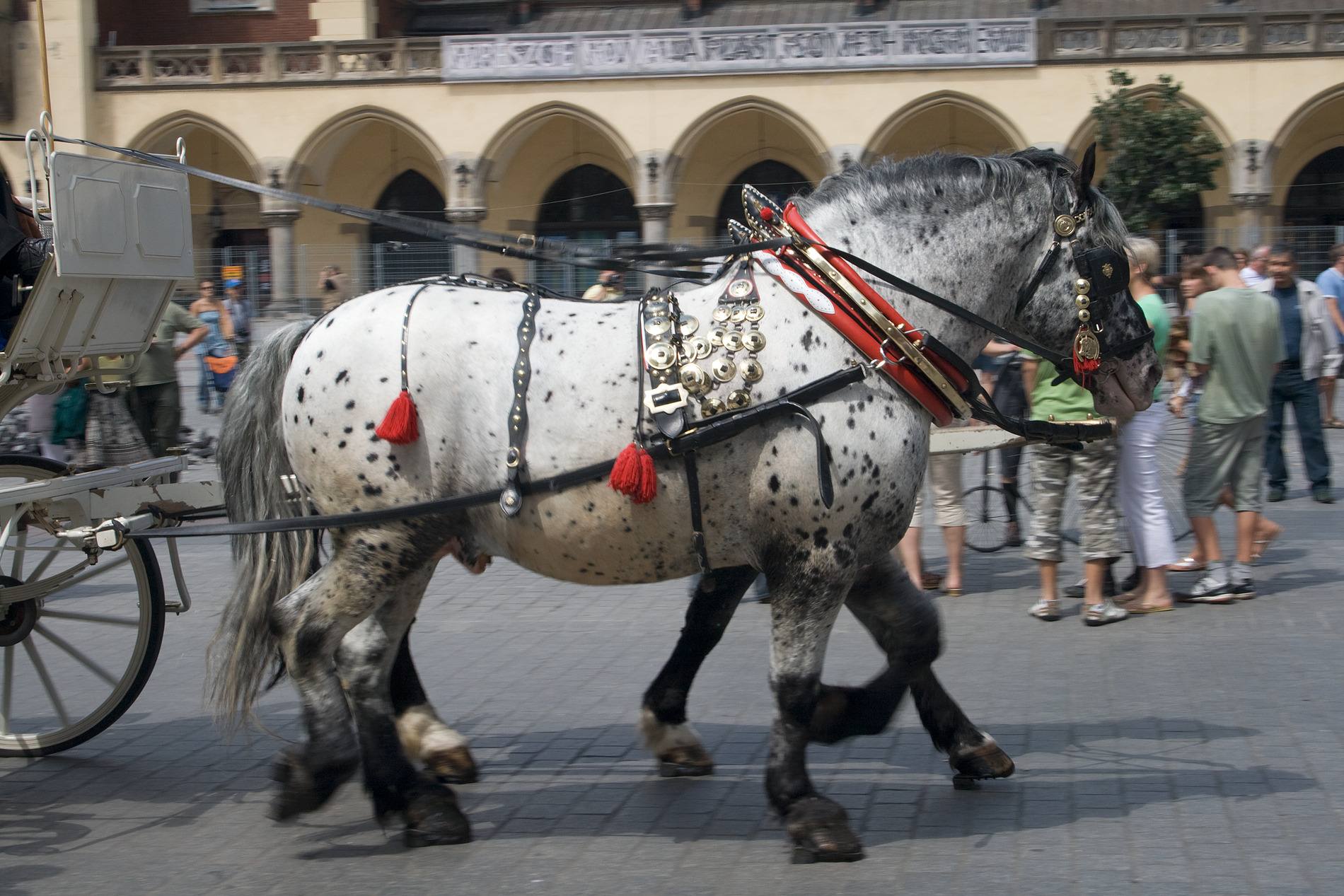
Decorative parade harness

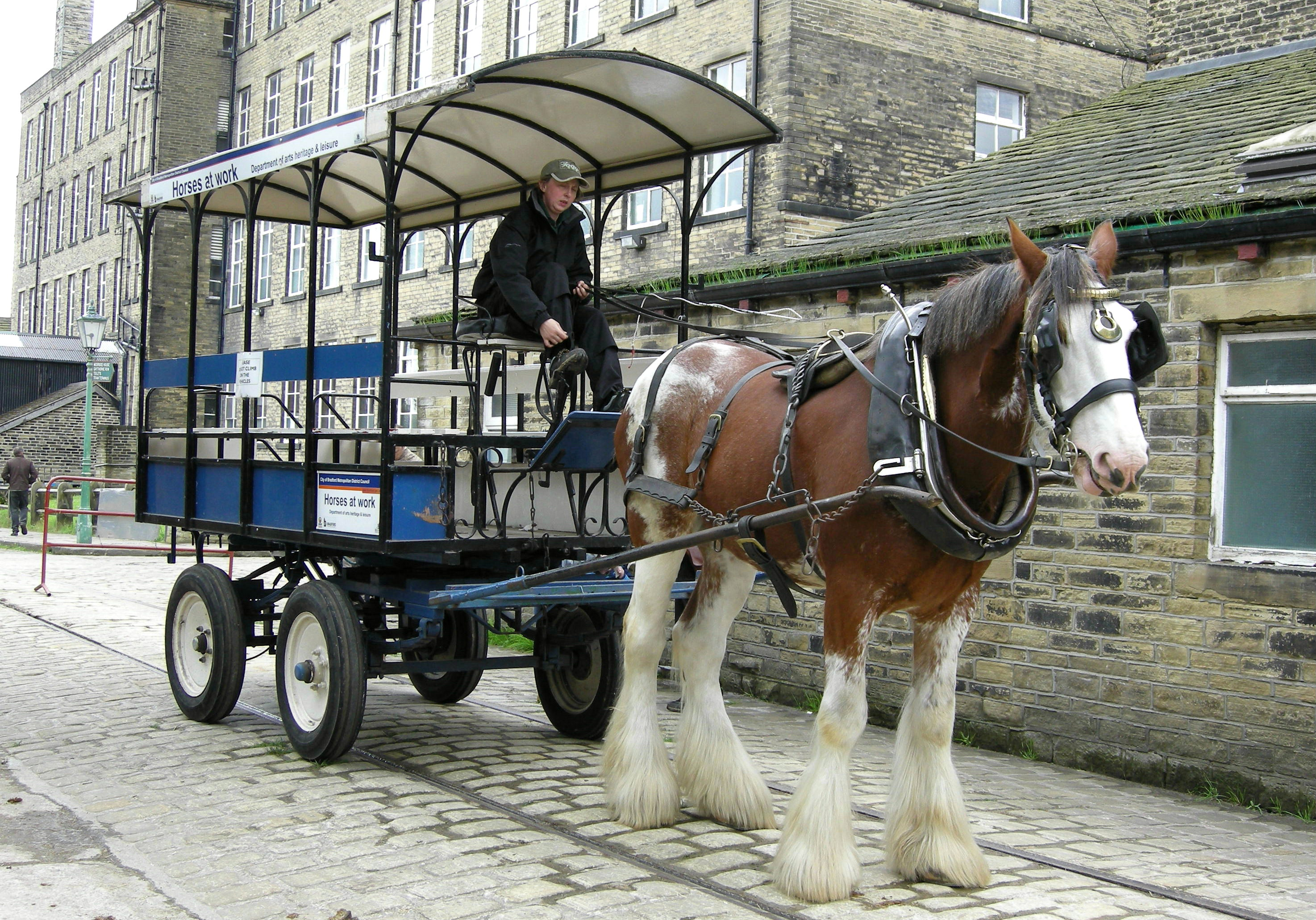
Working horse in harness

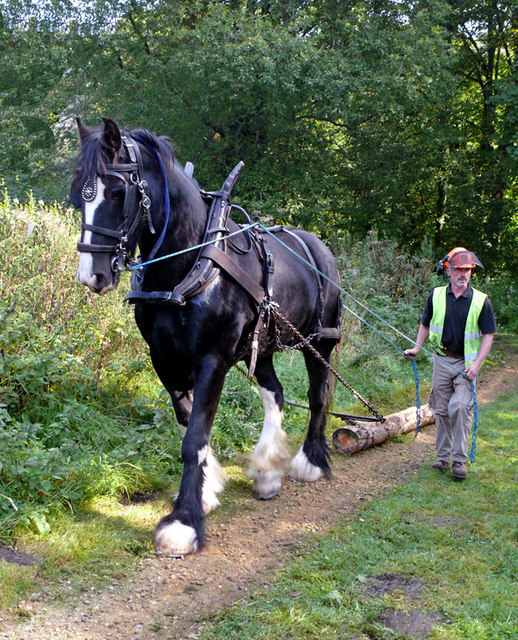
Logging

== See also ==
- Combined driving
- Dog harness
- Draft horse showing
- Driving (horse)
- Harness racing
- Horse brass
- Horse collar
- Horse tack
- Horse-drawn vehicle
- Santa Claus's reindeer
- Shaft bow
