= Horse brass =

Decorative brass plaque for horse harness gear

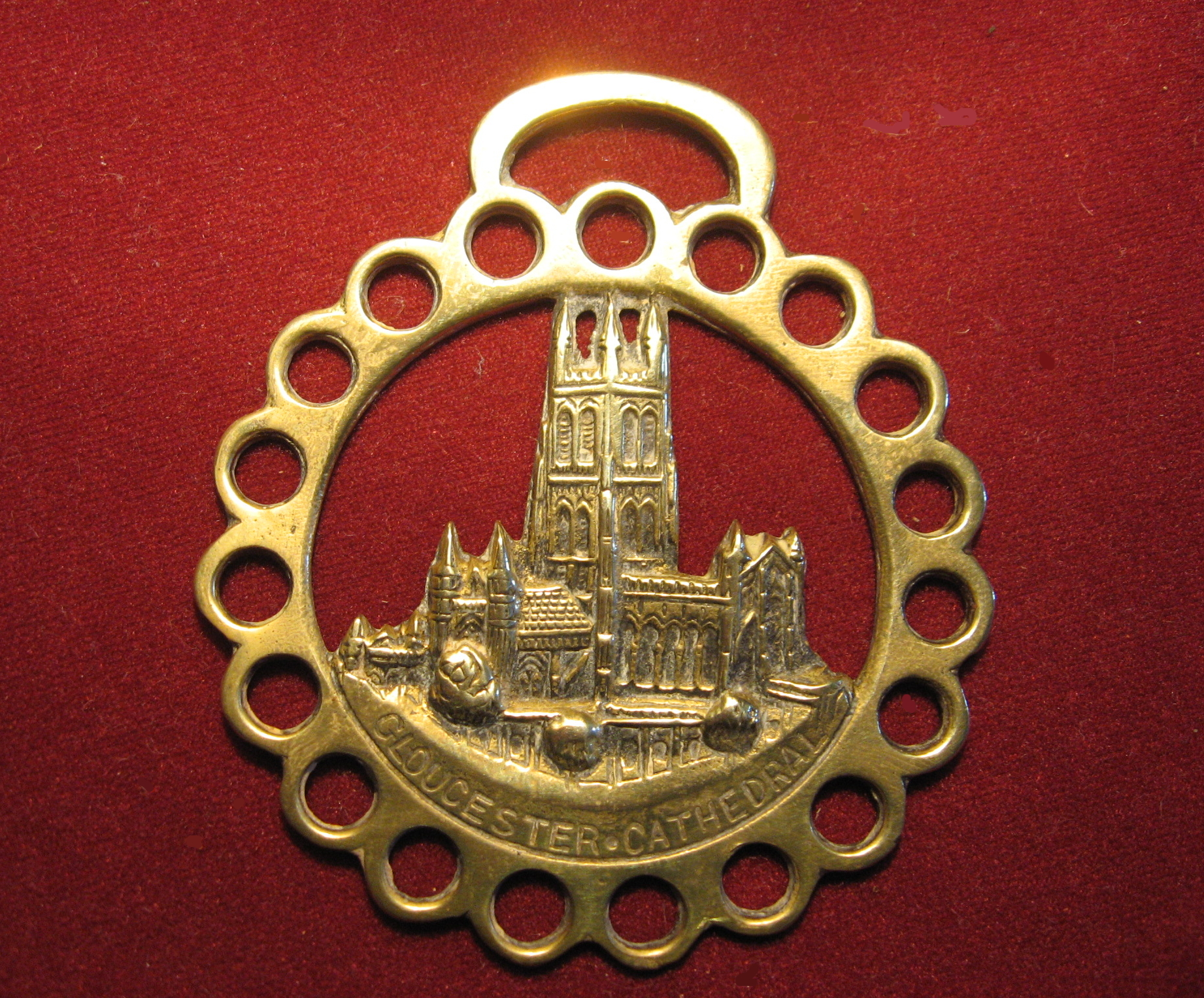
A modern souvenir horse brass featuring Gloucester Cathedral

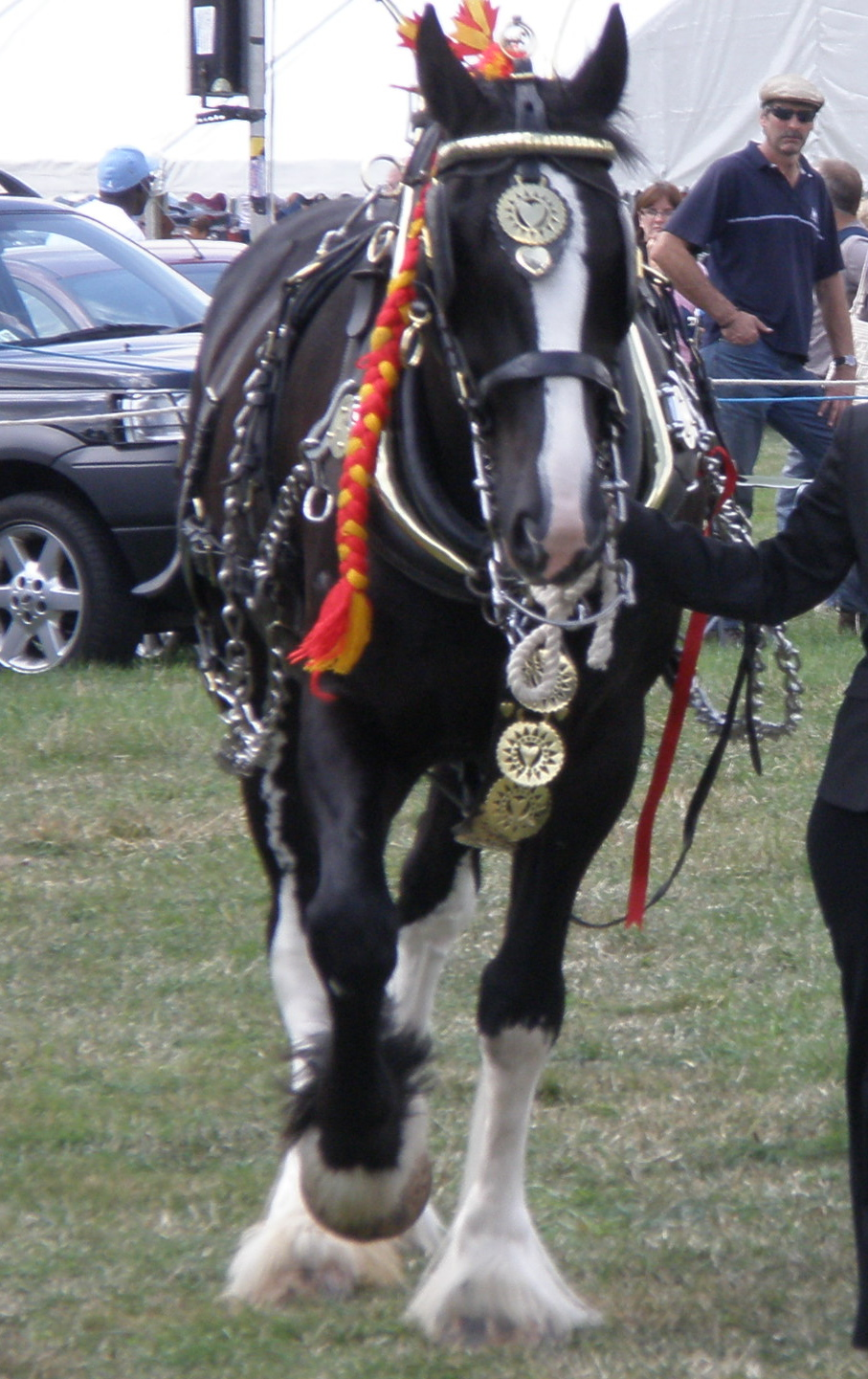
Horse harnessed with brasses

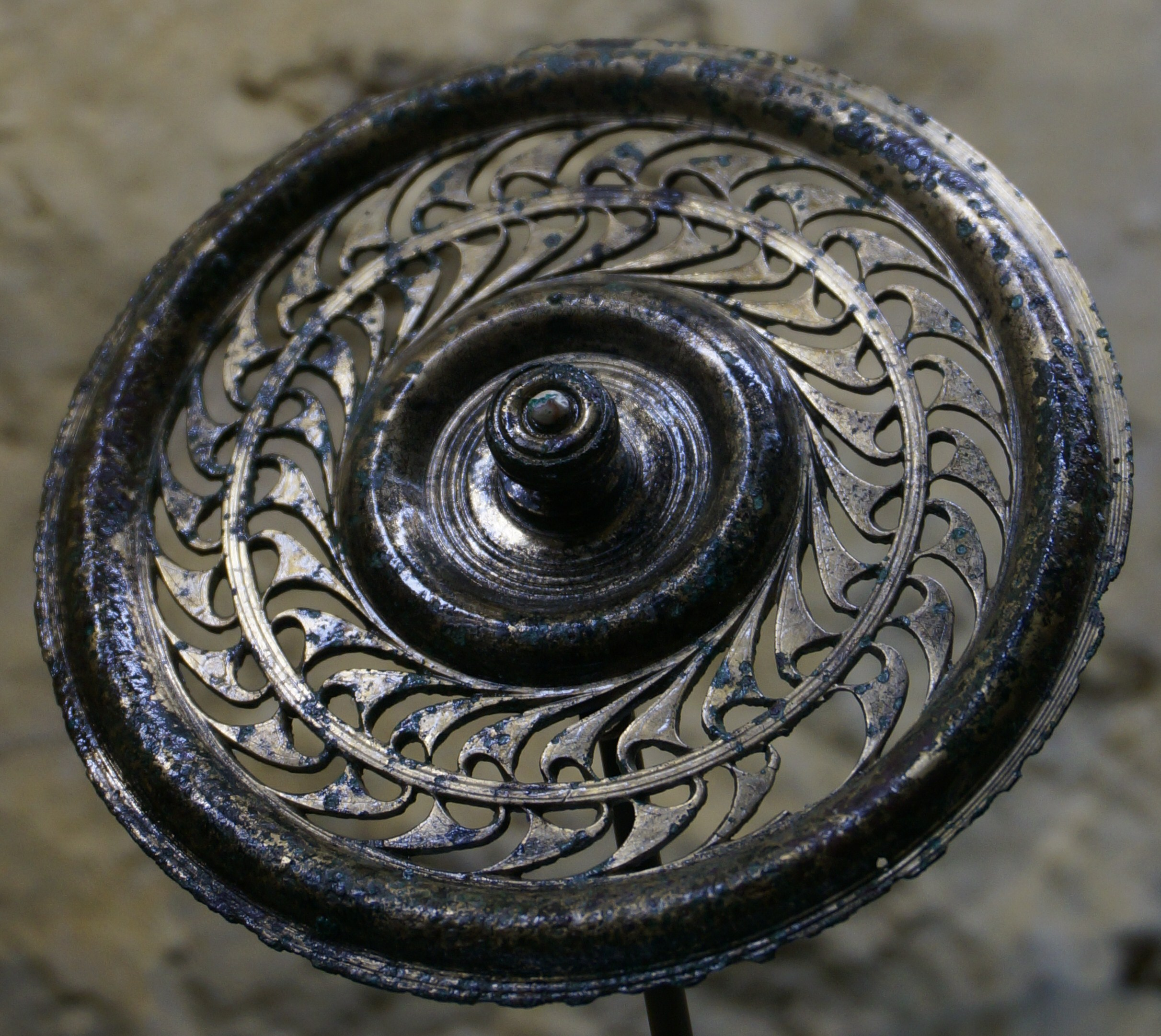
5th-century BC Celtic phalera from a chariot burial in Gaul

A horse brass is a brass plaque used for the decoration of horse harness gear, especially for shire and parade horses. They became especially popular in England from the mid-19th century until their general decline alongside the use of the draft horse, and remain collector's items today.

Phalera is the archaeological term for equivalent disks, which were popular in Iron Age Europe, including Ancient Rome.

== History ==
In ancient Rome, horse harnesses were sometimes embellished with horse brasses known as phalerae, normally in bronze, cut or cast in the shape of a boss, disk, or crescent, most often used in pairs on a harness. In medieval England, decorative horse brasses were in use before the 12th century, serving as talismans and status symbols, but extensive, original research by members of the National Horse Brass Society has shown that there is no connection whatsoever between these bronze amulets and the working-class harness decorations used in the mid-19th century which developed as part of a general flowering of the decorative arts following the Great Exhibition.

There are a great deal of myths surrounding these decorations such as their usage as amulets to ward off the "evil eye". The most popular size is 3 × 3 1/2 inches of flat brass with a hanger or suspension loop by which the brass is threaded onto a horse harness strap, known as a Martingale. In England many of these items of harness found their way into country pubs as the era of the heavy horse declined, and are associated with pub decoration. By the late 19th century heavy horses were decorated with brasses of all kinds and sizes. During this era working horse parades were popular throughout the British Isles and prize or merit awards were given, some by the Royal Society for Prevention of Cruelty to Animals (RSPCA). Horse brasses were often highly prized by the "carters", who decorated their horse with them. Other horse brass subjects include advertising, royalty commemoration, and in later years, souvenir brasses for places and events, many of which are still being made and used today.

== Collection ==
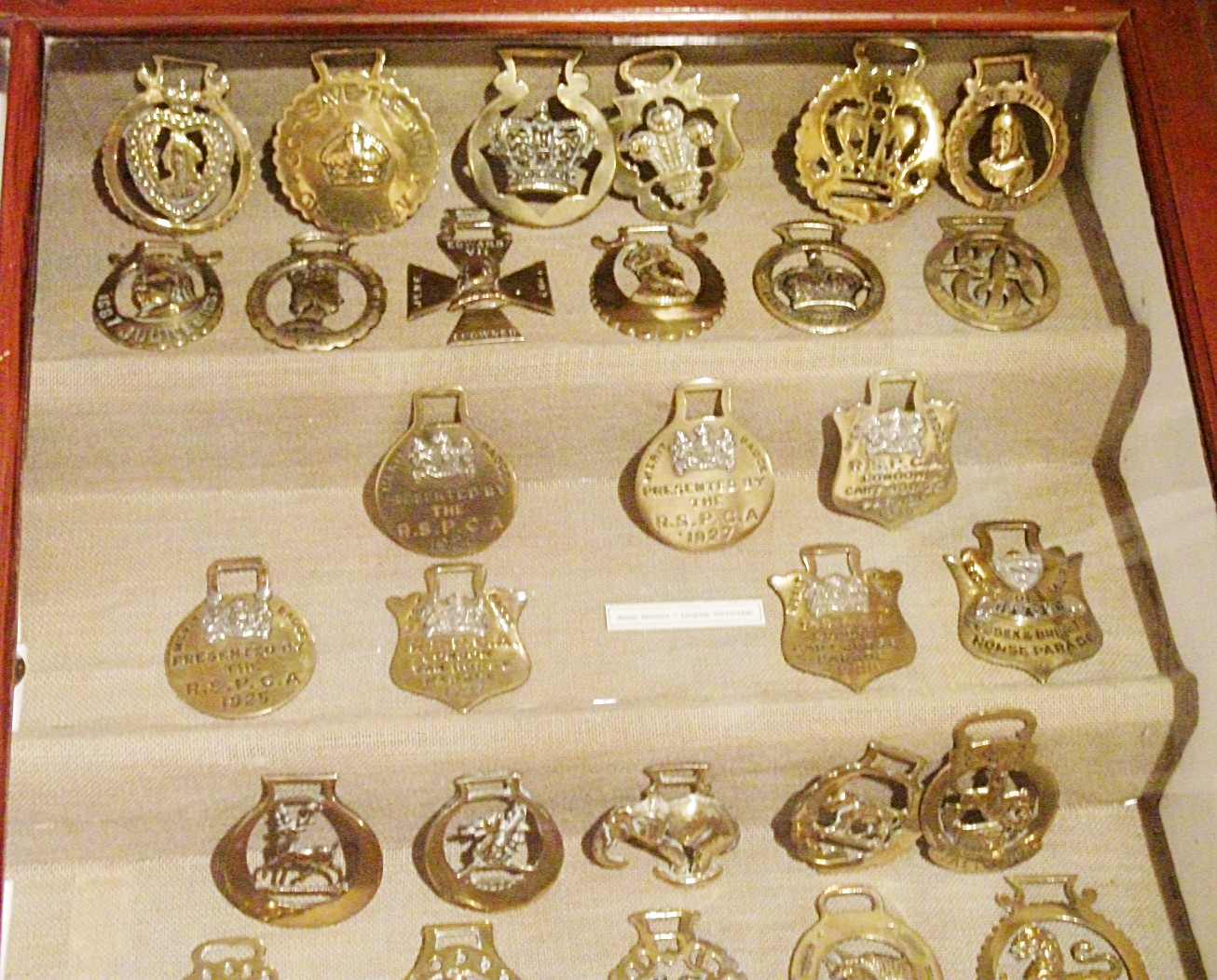
Display of English brasses

Collecting horse brasses for their own sake other than as decorations for harness seems to have commenced around 1880, when women bought the newly issued, pierced-design, die-struck brasses which were used for pin-cushions. A little later these were often used as fingerplates on doors which can be corroborated by accounts in the trade magazine, Saddler and Harness by the veteran saddler William Albery or Horsham in Sussex. From 1890 onward, collecting the various types of brass, i.e. face-pieces, swingers, and hame-plates, etc., became a highly popular pastime amongst the upper and middle classes. Indeed, the collecting of these humble brasses became especially popular amongst academics with many famous, early collections being formed by public schoolmasters and other prominent professionals, such as A.H. Tod, a Master at Charterhouse School, and Dr Kirk of Pickering in Yorkshire, whose collection is still housed at the York Castle Museum in York. The writing about such items also commenced c. 1890s and was dominated by much Victorian romanticism surrounding the supposed esoteric origin and ancient, unbroken lineage of these decorations. Such myths include their origin as talismanic symbols being brought back to England by homecoming knights returning from the Crusades, or in later years, by migrating Romani, though, once again, absolutely no evidence has ever been offered in support of these theories.

=== Cast brasses ===
Whatever the views of individual collectors as to when or where working-horse harness decoration first began in the British Isles, most collectors agree that sand cast brasses were the first to appear. Opinion is still divided as to how these originated, but most collectors nowadays agree that the earliest decorations were simple cast studs or medallions in a variety of shapes and sizes. The earliest types were probably even made locally by smiths or other skilled artisans but by the second half of the 19th century the horse brass production had evolved from a local, decorative cult into a national fashion with the bulk of their production centred around Walsall and Willenhall in the West Midlands.

=== Stamped brasses ===
Stamped brasses on heavy horse harness appeared on the scene around 1880, with a small number occurring perhaps a decade or so earlier, and it is highly likely that the process developed from one that was already established in the manufacture of carriage harness trappings and military insignia. Production of these appears to have peaked shortly before the First World War. Since the 1920s, a few types have been produced but their quality is rather poor, being made from thinner gauge brass sheet. Due to serious considerations of the sheer weight of cast harness decorations carried by working horses (first raised by the early animal welfare movements in the late 19th century) it is thought that the first stamped brasses were made as a lighter (and cheaper), alternative to cast brasses being later exported throughout the British Empire. Unlike their cast cousins, stamped brasses were not made in moulds, but pressed out of rolled sheet brass approximately 1/16 in thickness although other gauges of sheet than earlier examples. Due to the ease of their manufacture, many thousands of these stamped types were produced, but there are some that are very rare.

The production of both sand cast and stamped brasses has continued since the demise of the British working horse but their manufacture is mainly centred on the souvenir trade, and other specialist manufacturers who provide for the heavy horse world who still breed and show the various breeds.

The National Horse Brass Society of England has members all over the world and provides publications for members and swap meets.
