= Breastplate (tack) =

Piece of horse equipment across the chest

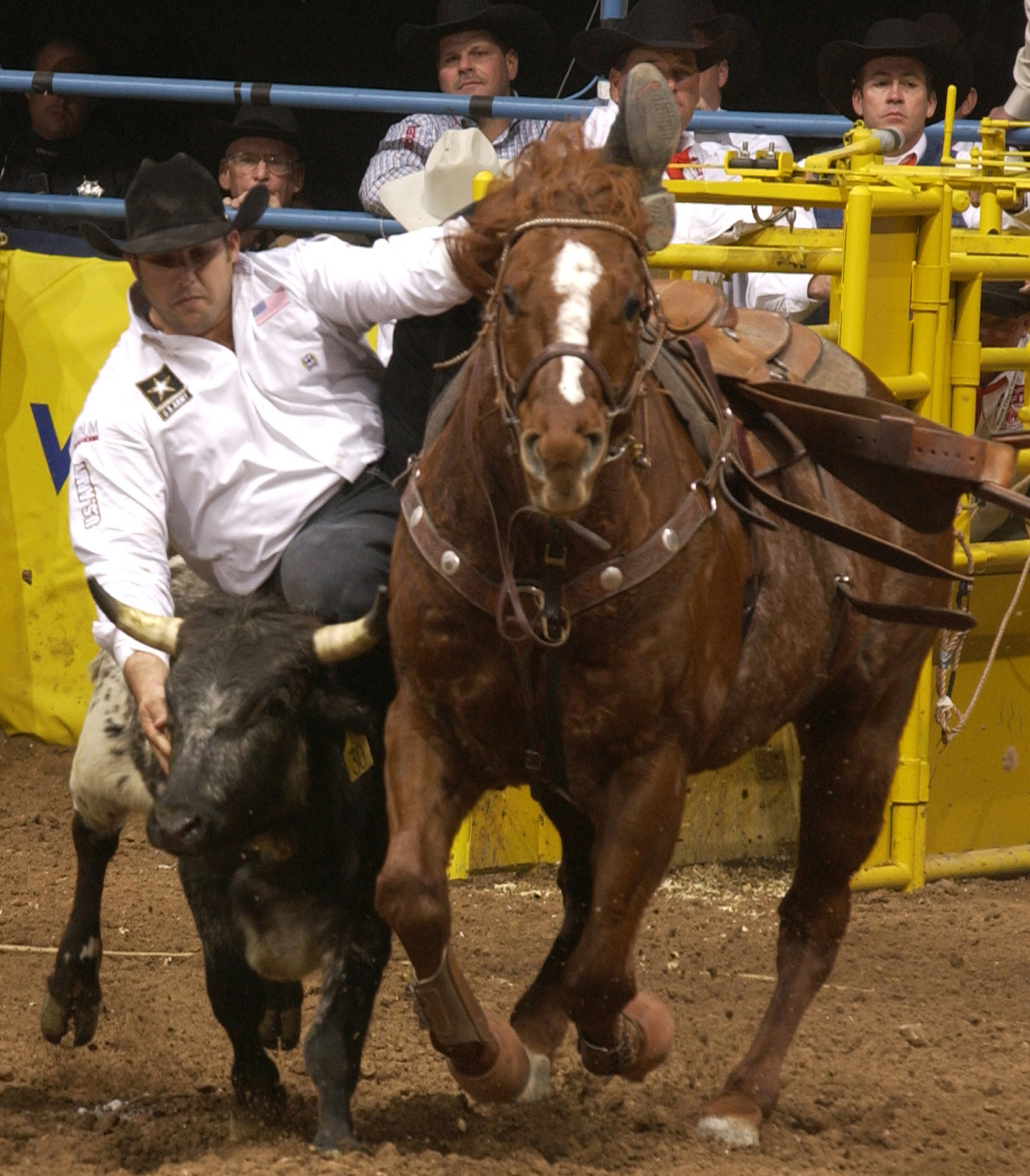
Western style breastcollar being used on a bulldogging horse

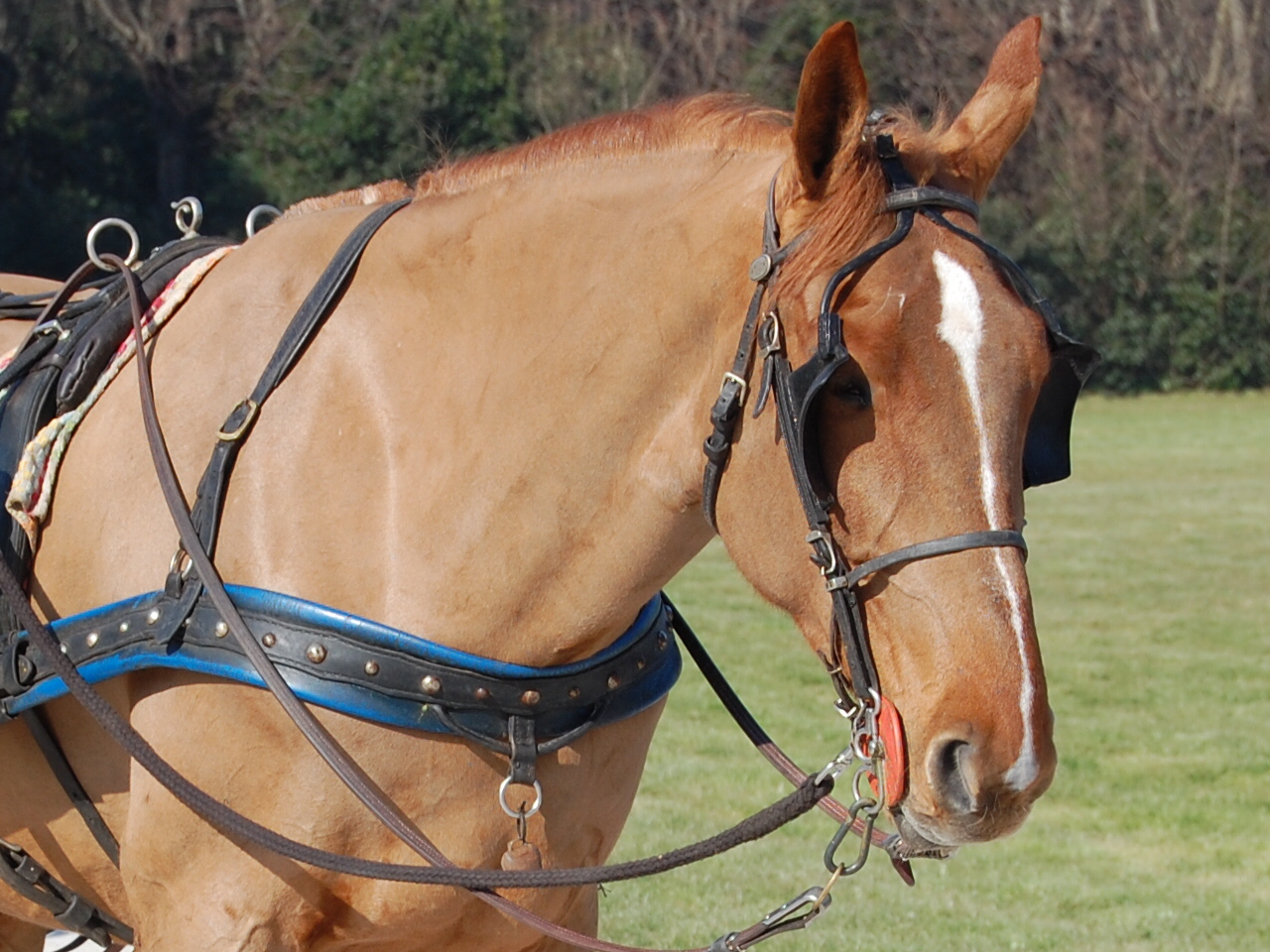
Breast collar on a harness horse

A breastplate (also referred to as a breastcollar, breaststrap or breastgirth) is a piece of tack (equipment) used on horses. Its purpose is to keep a saddle from sliding back. It is also a safety feature—if the saddle's girth or billets break, a rider may have enough time to stop the horse and dismount before the saddle slips off the animal's back. The breastplate is used on both English and Western saddles. Western riding involving working cattle use a thicker sturdier style than in English riding or Western riding horse shows. A breastplate is most helpful for horses with large shoulders and a flat ribcage. A breast collar as part of a harness is used to pull a load.

== History ==
When the Spanish Conquistador Cortez invaded Mexico in 1519 his small group of cavalry men all rode the old centerfire rigged War Saddle. Since the saddle was prone to slip back on the horse, a breast collar was used, usually with a shoulder strap to hold it up. Adding a crupper under the horse's tail, attached to the saddle was also required to maintain stability.

From the formation of the American cavalry in 1812 military saddles were single cinched and both a breast collar and crupper were used. Many Civil War photos show horses rigged with these pieces of equipment. It wasn't until the McClellan saddle was adapted that they were discarded.

Early Mexican vaqueros soon moved the front cinch forward, hanging the rigging directly under the fork, and solved the problem of saddle slippage. The unneeded breast collar was discarded, probably because it would catch on limbs when chasing a cow through brush. Both North American cowboys and South American gauchos followed their example and breast collars were seldom seen. The Texas development of the full double rigging in the early 1800s added even more saddle security.

Only on the Pacific Coast and Nevada ranges did the centerfire rigging remain popular. A martingale of the time (a leather loop around the horse's neck with an additional strap down to the cinch) helped stabilize the saddle in addition to being a fashion accent.

The rise of contest roping in the early 1900s returned the breast collar to popularity. While the first generation of contest hands didn't use one, those that followed learned that a breast collar was necessary. It not only kept the saddle in place during a hard start but was a “plus” when they laid their slack behind a 900-pound steer and rode by for the trip. It was also a handy place to tuck up the 2nd rope that they carried. The calf ropers and steer wrestlers quickly followed by example. By 1940, the majority of timed event contestants used a breast collar.

== Hunting or stockman's breastplate ==
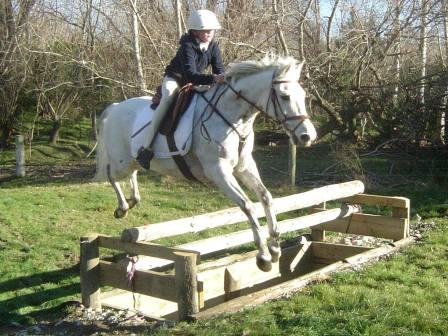
A pony wearing a hunting breastplate. Note where it attaches to the D-rings of the saddle.

Being the classic breastplate for English riding, campdrafting or stockwork, the stockman's or hunting breastplate is the most common type. It consists of a yoke (with a neck and wither strap), a breast strap at the bottom of the yoke which runs through the horse's front legs and attaches to the girth, and two straps at the top of the yoke which attach to the D-rings of a saddle. There are usually buckles for adjusting the size of the yoke as well as the length of the straps which attach to the saddle and girth. The hunting breastplate not only helps to prevent the saddle from slipping, but also may be used to attach a Market Harborough or standing and running martingales, which are clipped or buckled onto a ring at the chest.

The hunting breastplate is most commonly made of leather, and some have elastic inserts on the yoke to help prevent it from restricting the horse's shoulders. Those used in endurance riding are commonly made of lightweight nylon or another synthetic material.

The hunting breastplate is worn by endurance horses, show hunters, fox hunters, equitation horses, eventers (it can be seen used in all three phases), and show jumpers. It is also occasionally see in flat racing, as well as steeplechase.

Because the hunting breastplate is attached to the D-rings of the saddle (which are known to be pulled out under great pressure), it is not as reliable as equipment attached to the saddle by means of the billets. Therefore, the breastcollar is sometimes preferred on cross-country. The hunting breastplate also tends to have a restrictive effect on the shoulder, even when correctly fitted. Additionally, a hunting breastplate may cause the tree points of a poorly fitting saddle to dig into the sides of the horse's withers, creating rubs and great discomfort. In this case, it is best to get the saddle properly fitted before using a hunting breastplate.

== Western styles ==
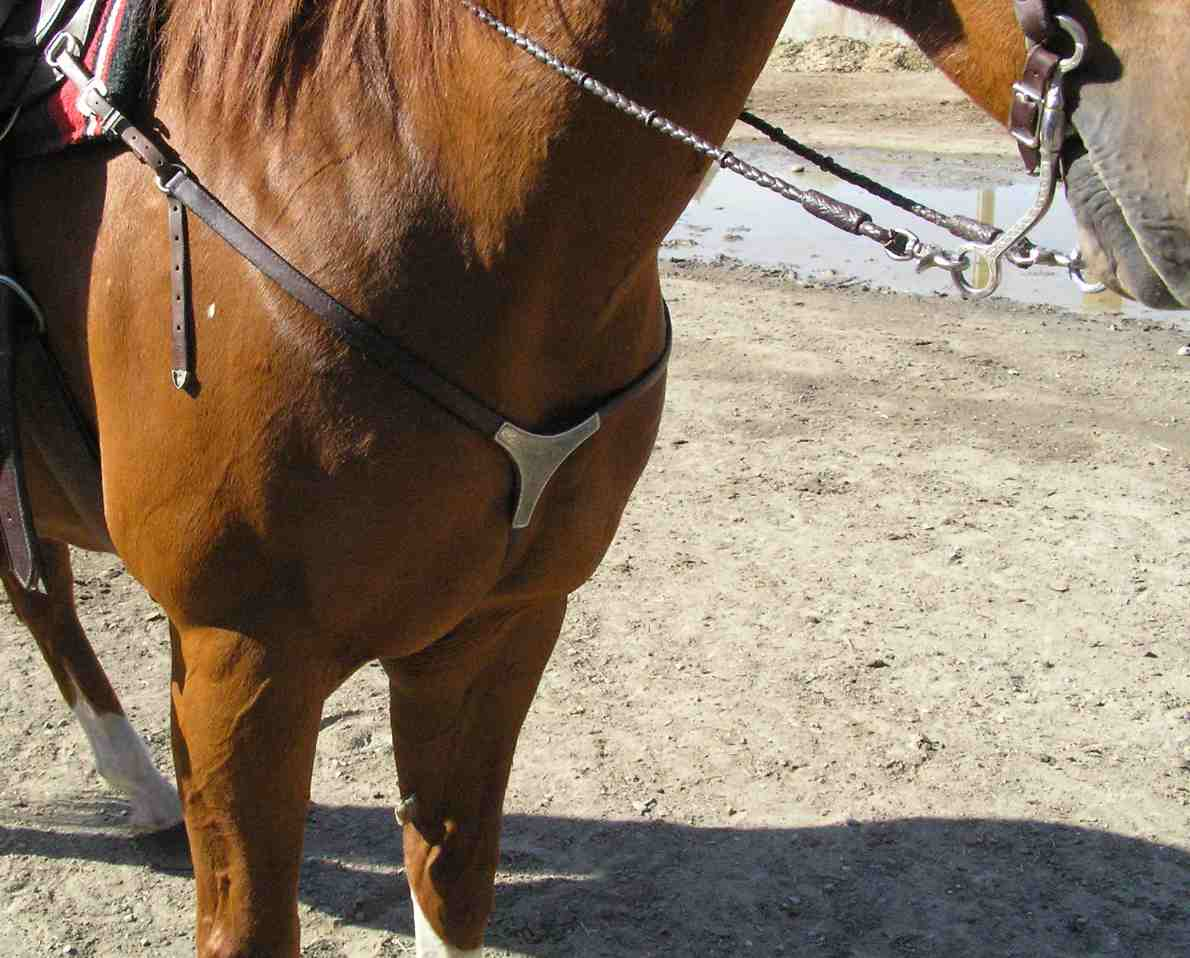
A western style breastplate, usually referred to as a breast collar

The variation of a breastplate used for western riding is referred to as a breast collar. The term "breastplate" is occasionally used, though western riders generally use "breast collar" to refer to both designs. A working western breast collar may be of either a breastplate or breastcollar design. attach to the d-rings that hold the latigo of the cinch, while one suitable for a horse show may attach to decorative dees located above the cinch rings, nearer the swells of the saddle. In either case, an additional strap usually runs between the front legs and attaches to the cinch. Some, though not all breastcollars for western riding also have a wither strap.

The breastplate should not be fitted in any way that will restrict the horse's movement. Special attention should be paid to the shoulders, chest, and the area between the horse's front legs. In general, a fist should fit between breastplate and the horse's chest, and there should be a hand's width between the wither strap and the withers. The breast strap should have some slack, and care should be taken that its buckle doesn't rub the sensitive skin in the area. It should also be adjusted so that the chest straps lie above the point of the shoulder so that the horse's motion is not restricted.

== Racing or polo breastplate ==
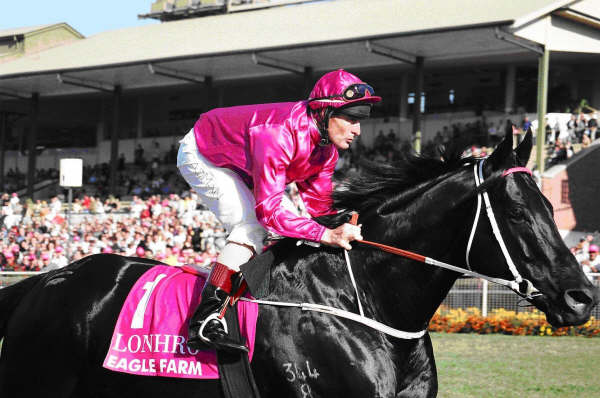
This racehorse wears a breastcollar

The breastcollar consists of a chest strap, which buckles to one billet of the saddle, runs around the horse's chest, and attaches to the first billet on the other side. It also has a wither strap, which is used to adjust the height of the breastcollar, and prevents it from slipping down too far. The breastcollar is often made of leather, strong elastic, or webbing.

The breastcollar is more secure than the hunting breastplate, because it attaches to either the front billet of the saddle, or to the front branch of a split-end girth (which is even more secure). It is therefore most desirable in eventing, especially on the cross-country phase, polo, and other jumping disciplines. It is not used in dressage, hunt seat, or equitation.

This style of breastcollar does not interfere with the horse's shoulders, as some other styles do. However, this style may interfere with the horse's ability to breathe when it puts its head far down. Thus, this style is not desirable for jumping and riding in steep terrain.

One disadvantage is it tends to restrict the shoulders more so than other breastplates.

The breastcollar should be fitted so the chest strap is horizontal from chest to girth. The wither strap should be adjusted so that it is not so low that it interferes with the horse's shoulders, or so high that it presses against the animal's windpipe. As a general rule, a fist should fit between the wither strap of the breastcollar and the withers, and the chest strap and the chest of the horse.

== Breastgirth or loop breastplate ==
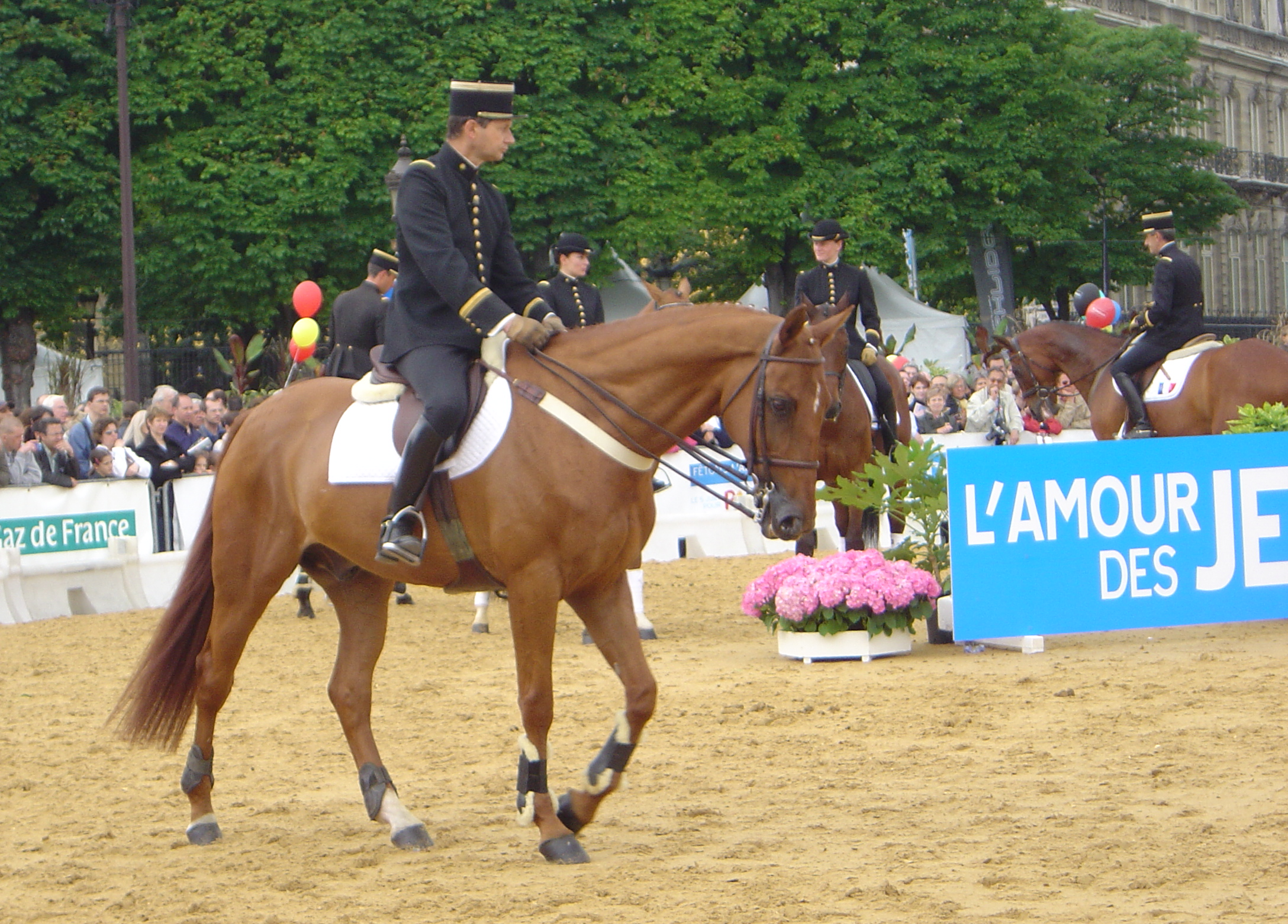
A breastgirth.

The breastgirth is made of strong elastic, and runs from either the D-rings of the saddle, or is attached to a loop that runs around the saddle's stirrup bars. Although similar to the breastcollar, there is no wither strap. Breastcollars are usually seen in show jumping and eventing (usually on the cross-country phase). They are desirable because they tend to be less-restrictive to the shoulders, so the horse is better able to pick up his front legs and fold over a jump.

If the breastgirth is not adjusted correctly, it will restrict the horse's breathing because it will press on the windpipe. Additionally, it is not as secure as the breastcollar when it is attached to the D-rings. The breastgirth should be adjusted so it does not restrict the horse's breathing. It should cross at the base of the neck, and may be adjusted snugly.

== Harness ==
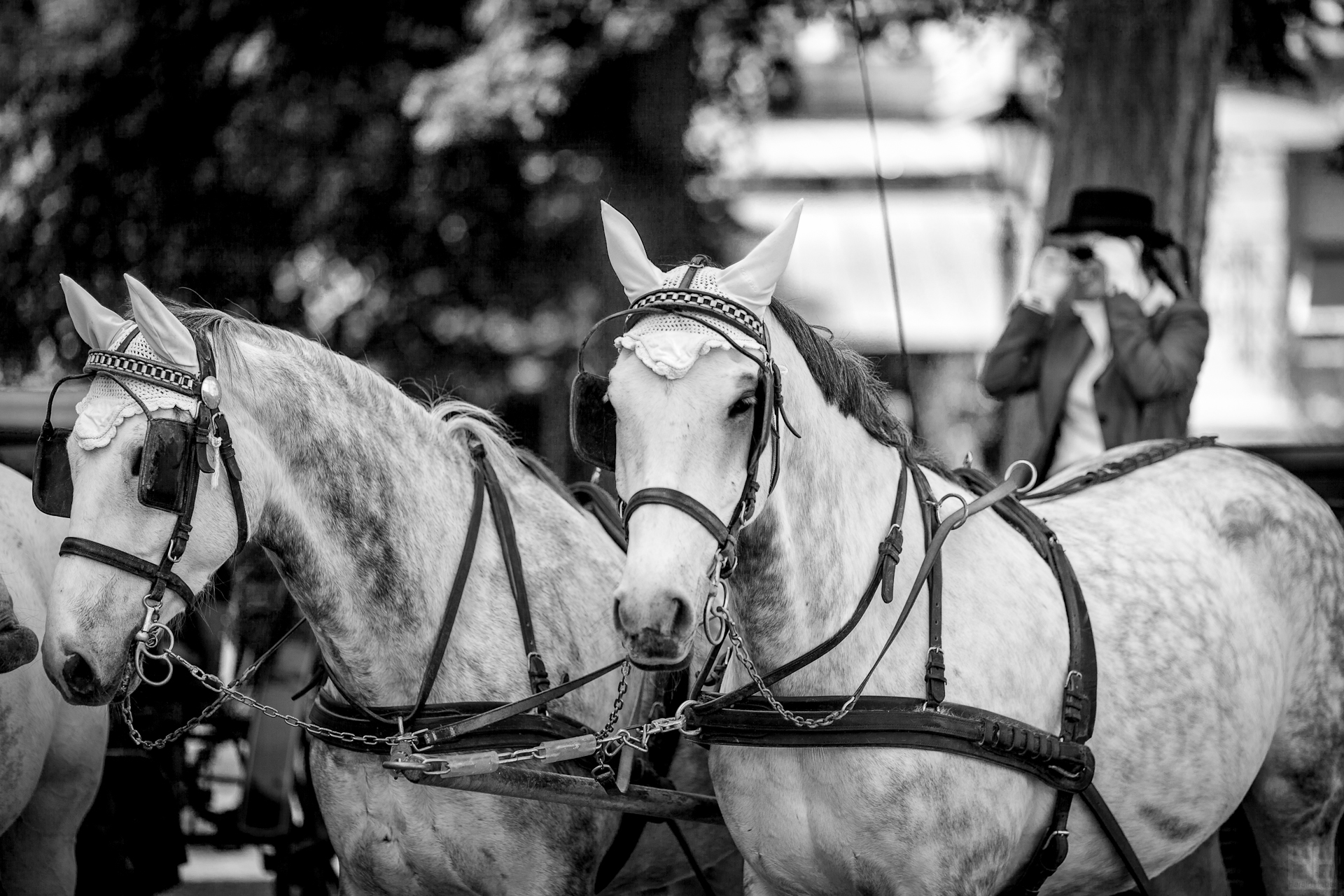
Breast collar harness showing breast collar, neck strap, and pole ring

Unlike the breastplates used for securing the position of a riding saddle, the breast collar in a driving horse harness is the strap used to pull the weight of a vehicle or load, and does not have a function of securing something in place.

The breast collar is a wide padded strap that passes around the front of the horse's chest. A neck strap goes over the neck to raise or lower the position of the breast collar—low enough to stay clear of the horse's windpipe, and high enough that it doesn't rub on the points of the shoulder. A pole ring or dee may be sewn into the center of the breast collar to attach a pole when driving two horses side-by-side. A yoke strap is sometimes attached to the pole ring of two side-by-side horses to keep them together; common in Hungarian harnesses. Occasionally a short strap, called a false martingale may be attached to the center of the breast collar, run between the horse's forelegs, and attach to the girth.

The breast collar harness is one of two main harness designs. The other design is the collar and hames design, also called a "full collar", which is required in order to pull very heavy loads because it distributes pressure over a larger area of the horse. One of the main advantages of using a breast collar style harness is that it fits on almost any size or shape of horse, unlike a full collar which must be sized appropriately for each horse. A breast collar should only be used with a singletree or you risk chafing the horse's shoulders.
