= Swingletree =

Connects horse to carriage

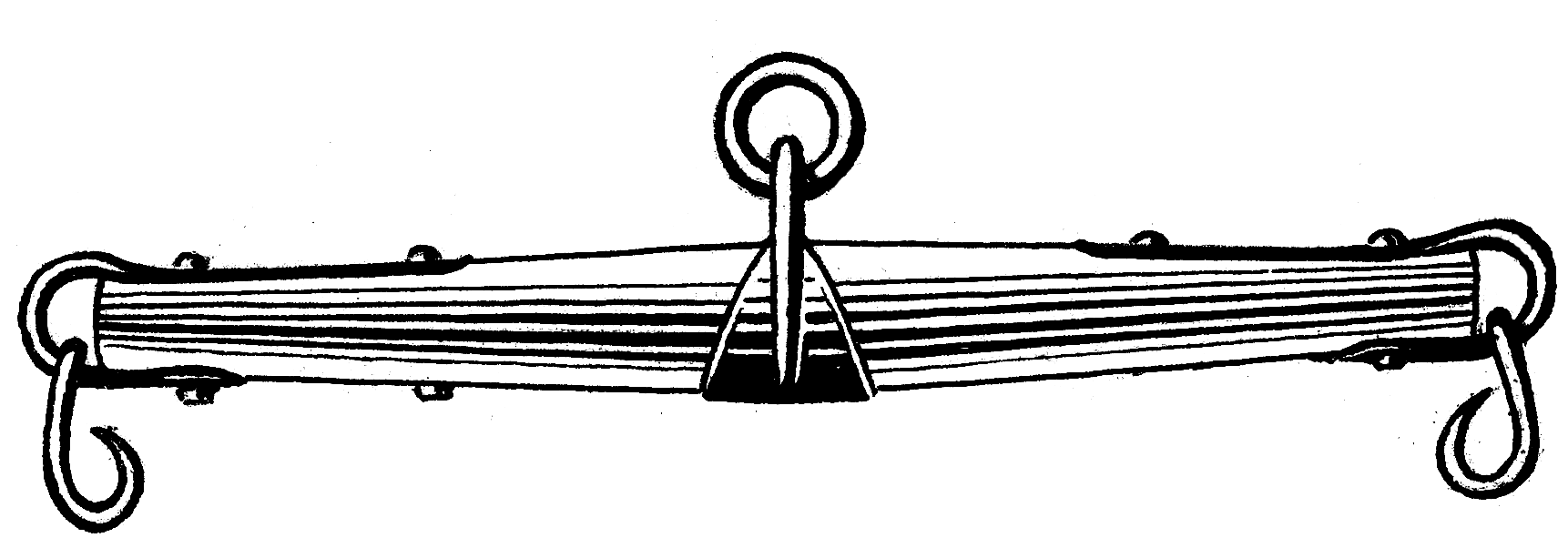
A typical wooden swingletree with iron fittings

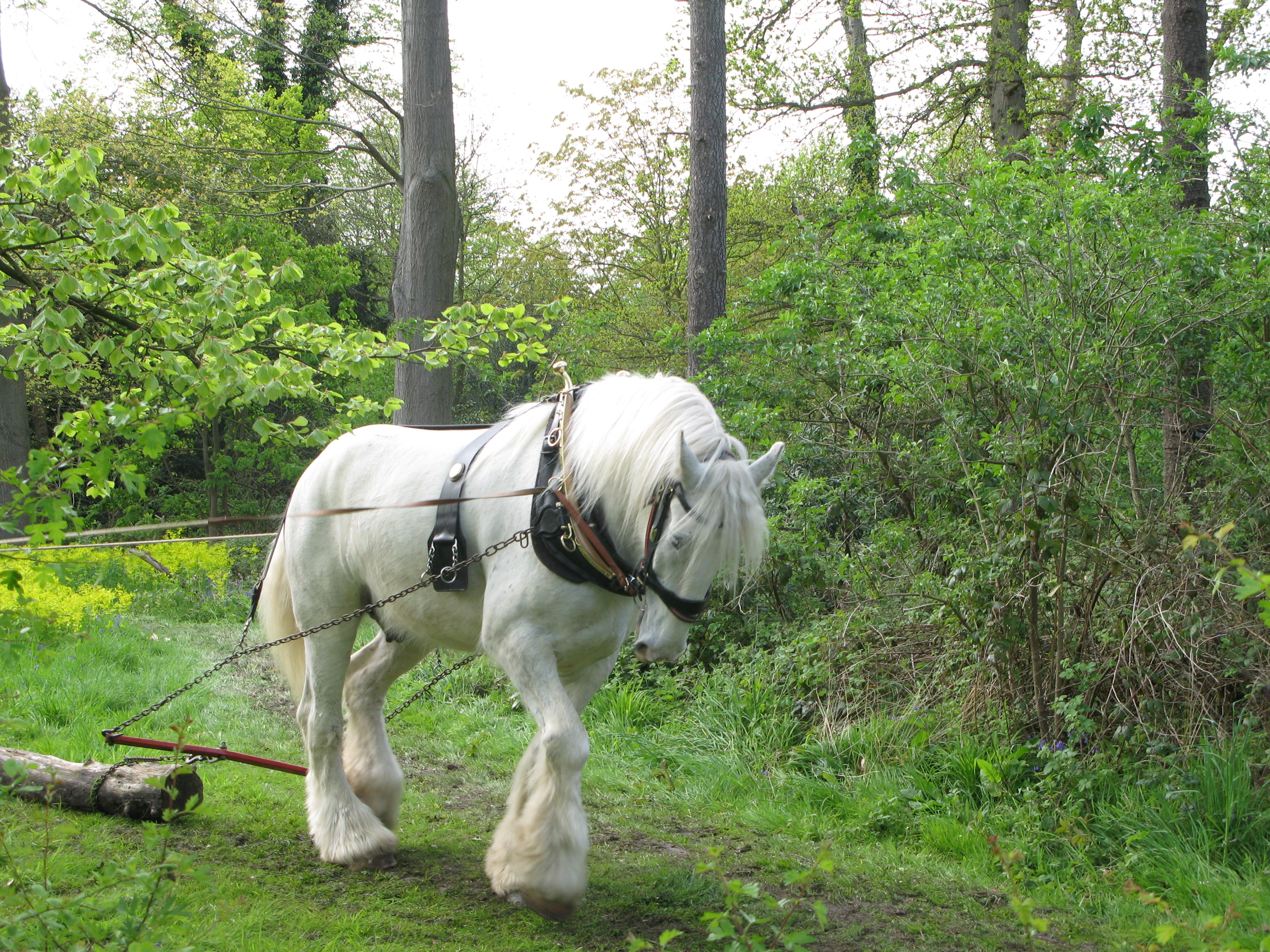
The red horizontal bar behind the horse is a swingletree

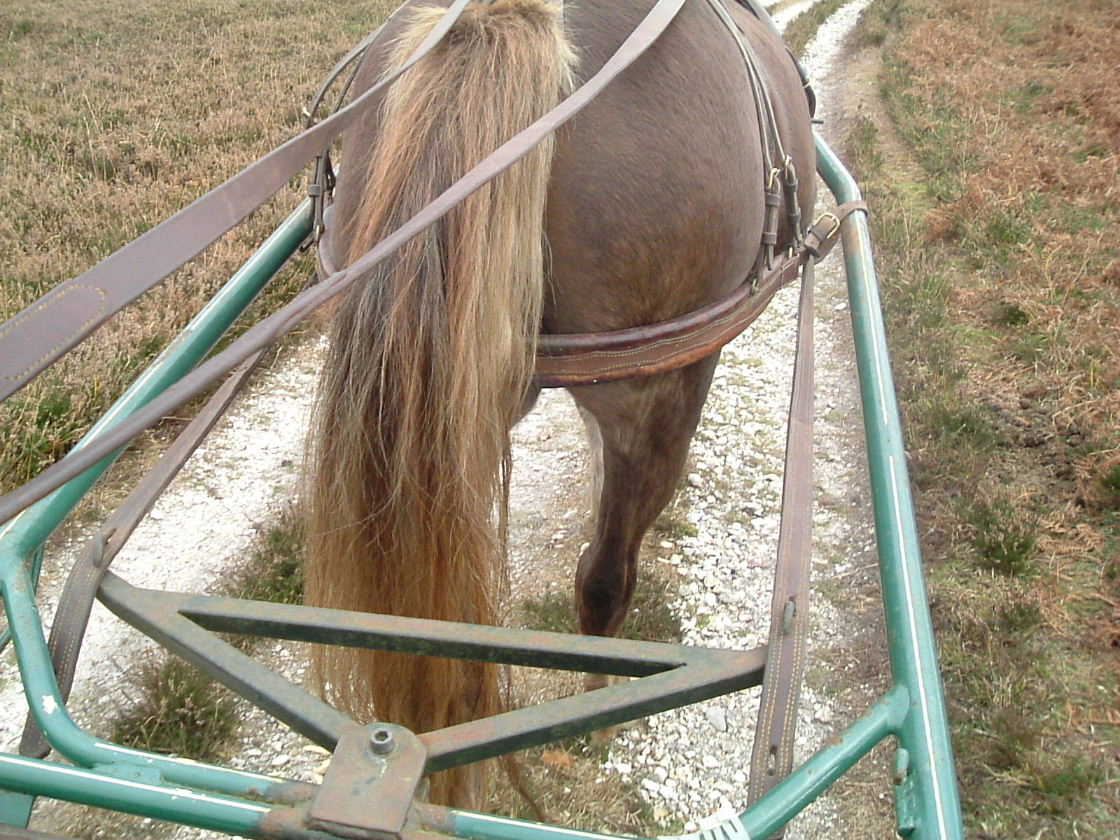
A swingletree built into a cart. The swingletree is the triangular piece in the foreground; the traces are the leather straps leading forward from this. (Swingletrees are more commonly a simple bar, not a triangle.)

A swingletree (British Isles) or singletree (North America) is a small wooden or metal bar behind a harnessed horse. It is used to balance the pull of a driving horse or other draught animal when pulling a vehicle or other load. It is a kind of whippletree, and the term is also used sometimes for other whippletrees.

The swingletree is a horizontal bar, attached or suspended in the middle, and able to pivot in a horizontal plane. The traces (the straps by which the horse pulls the load) attach to the ends of the swingletree, and the load is pulled from the centre point.

The centre of the swingletree may be bolted directly to the body of the vehicle, this bolt pulling the vehicle along. Alternatively it may hang loosely by a chain or strap from the body of the vehicle, and in this case the pull is taken by chains from the centre of the bar to the ends of the axle.

The action of a swingletree is to balance the pull from alternate shoulders as the horse walks. It is used especially when the horse is in a breastcollar harness, because this can easily rub the shoulders if the pull is uneven. It is needed less when pulling with a horse collar, as the pull does not pass over the shoulders in the same way. For this reason heavier vehicles may have no swingletree, as they are normally pulled with a horse collar.
