= Parade horse =

Horse decorated for use in a parade

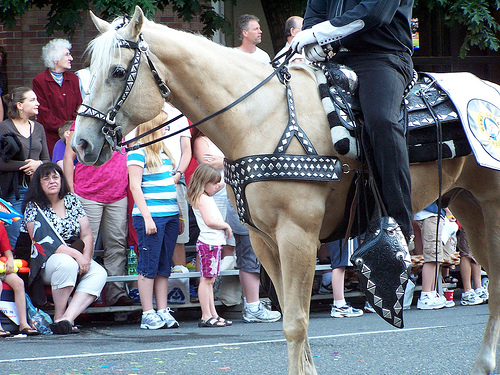
Classic "parade horse" silver-plated gear, including elaborately decorated western saddle, used more often in exhibitions but occasionally seen in actual parades

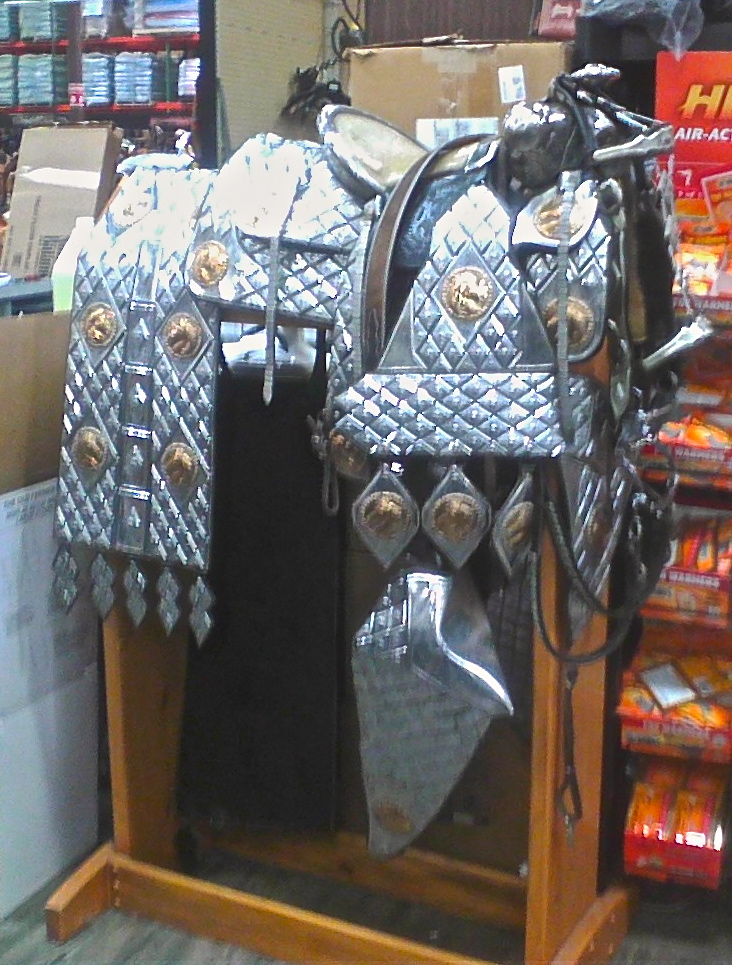
Parade saddle with extensive silver plating

Horses are ridden and driven in actual parades in many different ways. However, a Parade horse refers specifically to a type of horse attired in elaborate, specialized equipment that is more often seen today in specialized competitions and exhibitions than in parades.

The "Parade horse" class is a form of competition seen at horse shows and festivals in the United States and Canada where the horse is attired in elaborate forms of western-style equipment, adorned heavily with silver, and the rider is dressed in brightly colored, elaborately decorated western wear. The hooves of the horse are often covered in sequins and brightly colored ribbons may be added to the mane and tail.

Horses are shown at a walk and a type of slow trot called a "Parade gait." High-stepping gaits and good manners are emphasized.

The equipment worn by the horse includes a western saddle, usually of black leather, that has extensive silver decoration, exaggerated features such as long tapaderos on the stirrups, flank trappings, with a heavily decorated breast collar added to the front. The bridle is also heavily decorated with silver, and, unlike most western-style bridles, has a noseband.

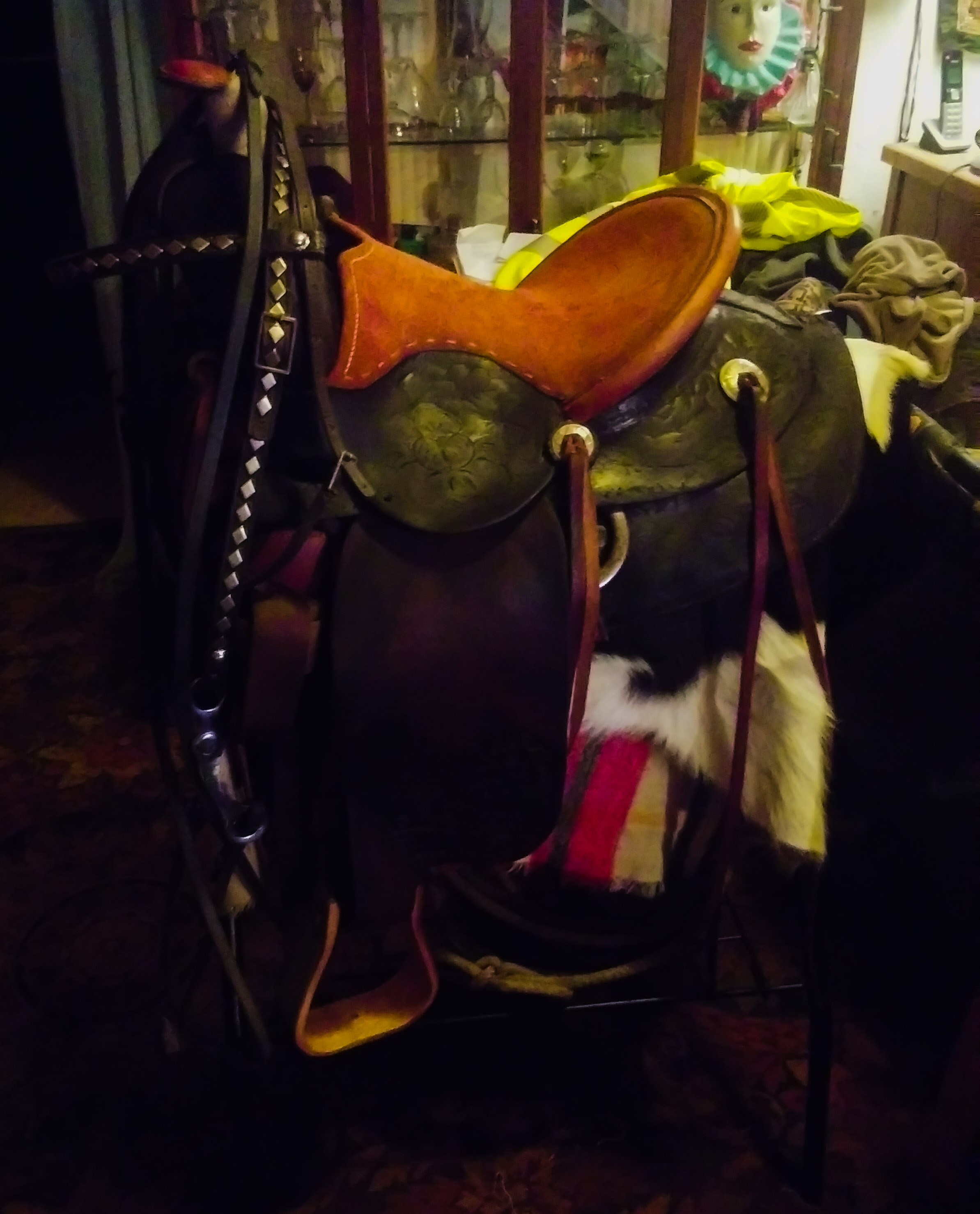

This type of competition is seen primarily in American Saddlebred and Morgan horse competition. However, this type of attire is occasionally still seen on horses ridden in real parades, particularly major events in the southwestern United States, where there is still a strong Spanish cultural tradition, such as the Tournament of Roses Parade. The Hawaiian culture also has a tradition of using elaborately decorated horses and riders in parades and festivals riders in this tradition are known as "Pāʻū riders". This tradition involves the decoration of the horse and rider in flowing garments and Leis and utilizes a great variety of flowers to decorate the animal and rider. The dominant color of the Pāʻū Rider is determined by which island they are from.

== See also ==
- Parade
- Pāʻū riders
