= Tapadero =

Horse riding equipment

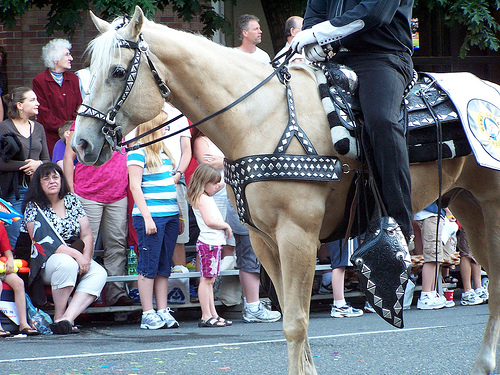
Parade saddle with tapaderos on the stirrups

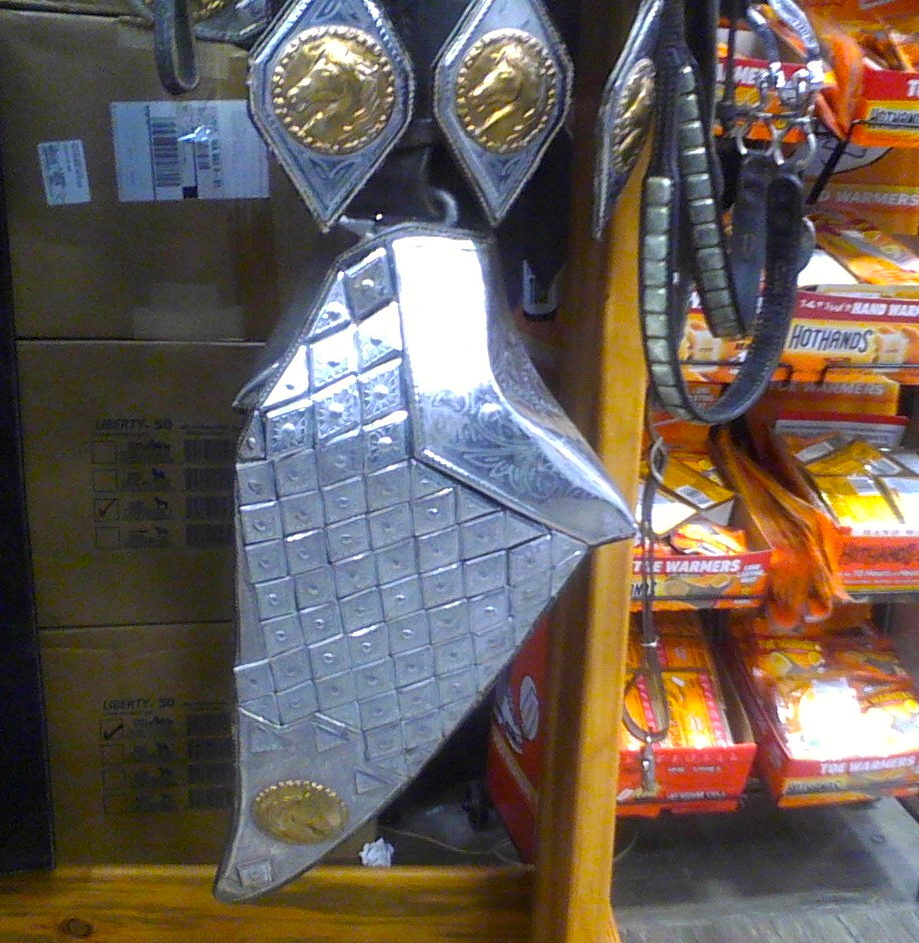
Parade saddle stirrup with tapadero, with extensive silver plating

A tapadero, sometimes referred to as a "hooded stirrup," is a leather cover over the front of a stirrup on a saddle that closes each stirrup from the front. A tapadero prevents the rider's boot from slipping through and also prevents brush encountered while working cattle on the open range from poking through the stirrup, injuring or impeding the horse or rider. Some designs can also provide protection in cold weather. They are also frequently used with young riders, as many parents and riding instructors feel they are a safety precaution. Most commonly seen today on a western saddle, particularly certain types of children's saddles and parade horse saddles, the tapadero is not common in modern times and is not allowed in most show competition other than Parade Horse competition and children's leadline.
