= Chambon =

Piece of horse tack

Chambon, left, gogue, right

A chambon is a piece of horse tack. It is a strap that runs forward from the bottom of the girth or surcingle, and forks. The forks continue to a ring on either side of the bridle or halter, at the base of the crownpiece. Running through those rings, the forks follow the cheekpieces to the bit. They may attach to the bit or pass through the bit rings and attach to themselves below the horse's neck.

A chambon prevents the horse from raising its head beyond a fixed point. Raising the head causes the length of the chambon along the cheekpieces to shorten and thus puts reciprocal pressure on the horse's mouth and on the horse's poll. Horses generally dislike pressure behind the poll and learn to release the pressure by lowering their head, and when in motion, this encourages the horse to relax its back and bring its hindquarters further under its body, thus encouraging collection. The chambon has the opposite function to an overcheck or bearing rein, which is used to raise the horse's head.

== Use in lungeing ==
The chambon is used mostly in training horses via lungeing. The chambon was originally intended for lungeing and free schooling and rolly polys . It is advanced equipment for use by knowledgeable trainers. A chambon is not a way to quickly fix the head set of a horse; its purpose is to help develop the correct muscles. Chambons help a horse to develop the muscles of their back and topline. It applies pressure to the poll and mouth of the horse when he raises his head, releasing when the horse stretches long and low, down toward the ground. When a horse is lunged correctly, and the chambon is correctly adjusted, the horse stretches down and raises his back.

Before using a chambon, the horse is taught to give correctly while worked in hand. If not, the horse may not understand that it needs to lower its head in response to the pressure, and thus may panic when it feels the upward and ungiving pressure on the bit, and possibly rear. The advantage of the chambon is that it only comes into effect when the horse raises its head, so the horse has some control on its action. It generally works very well on horses in adjusting their head position. However, it has no direct effect on the hindquarters, so the handler must use a lungeing whip or other method to encourage impulsion in the horse.

If a horse is not lunged properly, he may begin to go on his forehand. Chambons can also cause sore neck muscles if overused.
