= Gogue =

Horse tack

Chambon (left) and de Gogue (right)

The Gogue or de Gogue is a piece of horse tack used for training purposes. It is somewhat similar to the chambon but can be used ridden as well as for lungeing.

Its purpose is to encourage the horse to raise the neck, free the shoulders and engage the hocks, so that he may develop the correct muscles for a rounded topline.

== History ==
The Gogue was developed by the French horseman René Gogue (1903-1988), who graduated from the French Military Academy of Saumur. René Gogue invented his rein in 1948 and immediately became an adviser of famous European riders. He theorized that poorly or unschooled horses had three points of resistance: the poll, the mouth, and the base of the neck. The triangular system was designed to release that tension.

== Fittings of the Gogue ==
The Gogue has two fittings: the independent and the command.

=== The independent fitting ===
This is used for longeing or free-schooling the horse, when the trainer is dismounted, and some trainers also begin early mounted schooling in the Gogue. The Gogue is made a leather piece with cords attached. These cords fork at the horse's chest and each run through one of the bit rings. The cord then follows the cheekpiece of the bridle up to a ring or pulley at the side of the browband, before going back down to snap to the leather piece near the chest. The leather extends so that it can attach to the girth.

The horse is therefore "in control" of the action of the Gogue: when he keeps his head in the acceptable position, the Gogue has no effect. When he sticks his nose out or raises his head, the Gogue comes into action, raising the bit in his mouth and applying slight pressure to the poll.

=== The command fitting ===
This is for use during mounted work. The leather piece of the Gogue is attached to the girth, and it forks near the chest into two cords. The cords are then run to the rings or pulley at the browband, down the cheekpieces, and through the bit ring. From the bit ring they go toward the rider's hands, and snap onto shortened Gogue reins (which have metal rings at the end specifically for this purpose).

The rider should also ride with reins attached in the "normal" position to the bit, so he may use the Gogue rein as needed. Additionally, it can be jumped in (it has been used in competition) or ridden in cross-country.

== Warnings on use ==
The Gogue is a tool that is best used by advanced trainers that understand its application and have been trained to use it. The horse must go actively forward when the Gogue is in use. The Gogue may be adjusted extremely short as a device for rollkur, and opponents of rollkur consider this to be abuse of the horse. Additionally, novice riders should not use a Gogue when schooling, and more experienced riders are best to use it under the supervision of an instructor.

== Books ==
René Gogue, Le cheval dans le bon sens, Maloine Paris, 1979 René Gogue, "Problèmes équestres", Maloine Paris, 1996 René Gogue, Les voies du succès, principes équestres pour tous, Jean-Michel-Place Paris, 2002
