= Horse tack =

Equipment for use on domesticated horses

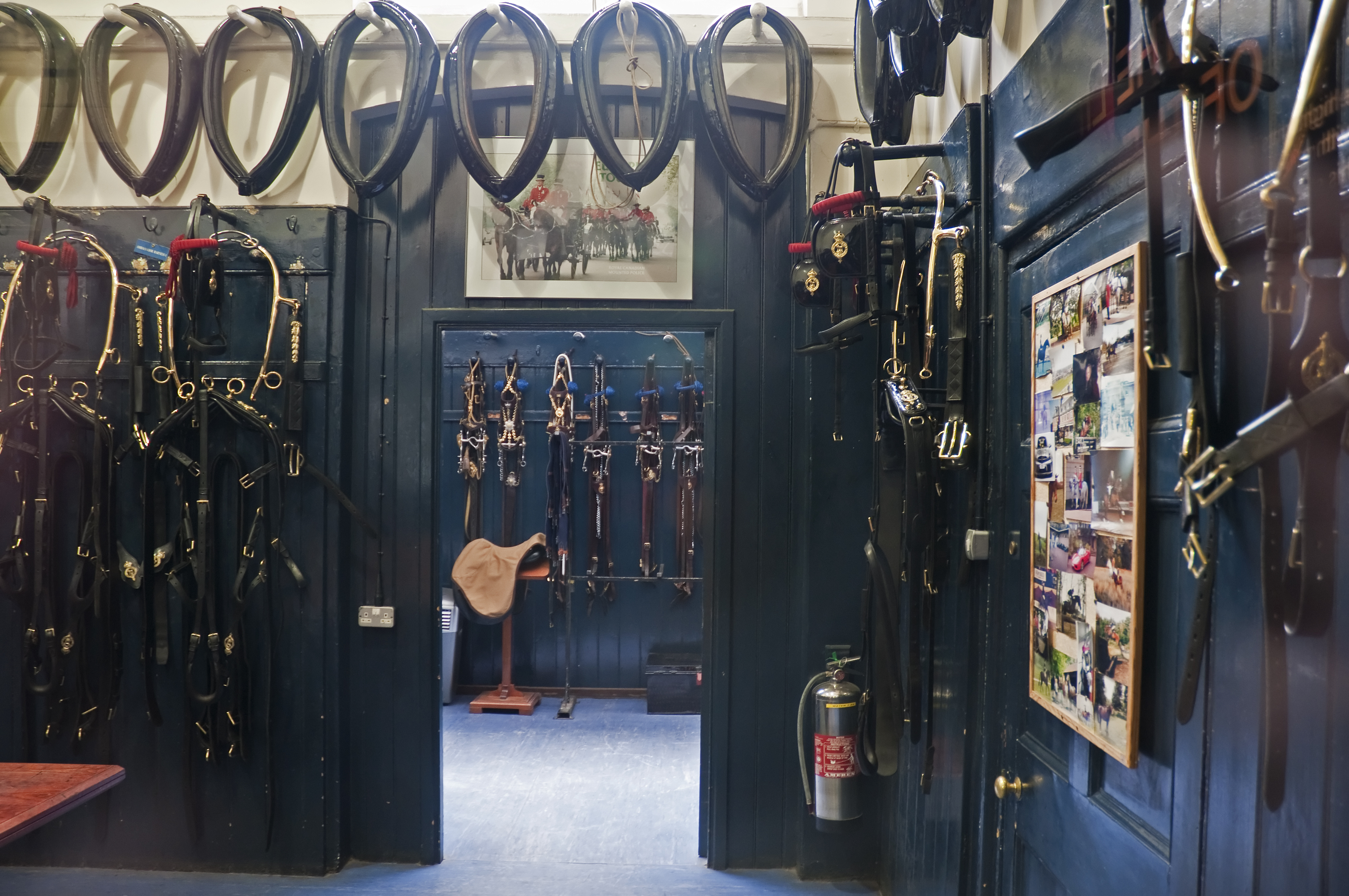
Working tack room at the Royal Mews in London showing driving and riding equipment

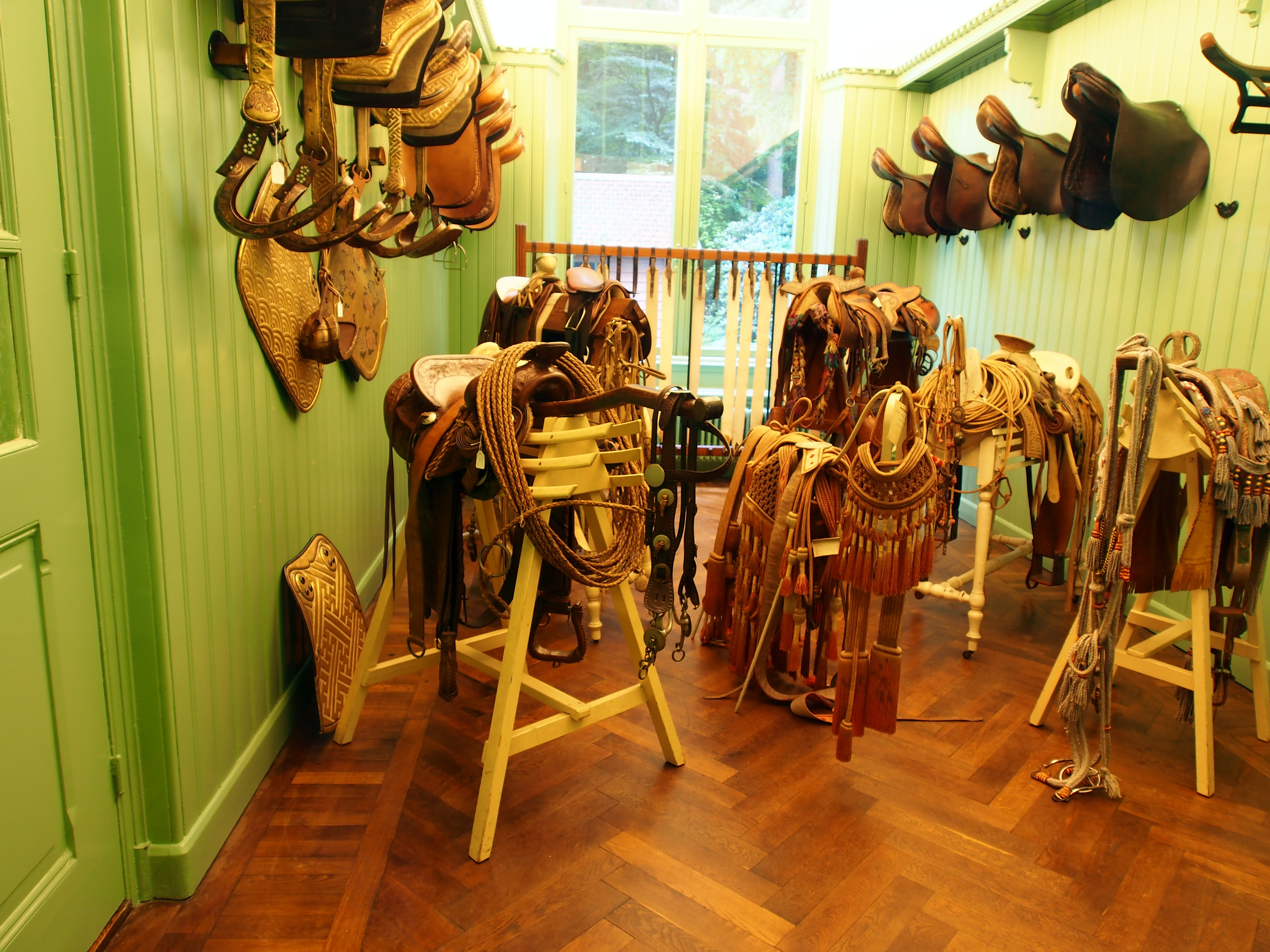
Saddles in a tack room

Tack is equipment or accessories equipped on horses and other equines in the course of their use as domesticated animals. This equipment includes such items as saddles, stirrups, bridles, halters, reins, bits, and harnesses. Equipping a horse is often referred to as tacking up, and involves putting the tack equipment on the horse. A room to store such equipment, usually near or in a stable, is a tack room. A craftsman who makes horse tack is a saddler and the trade is saddlery.

In English, the word "tack" is an uncountable noun with no plural form.

== Saddles ==
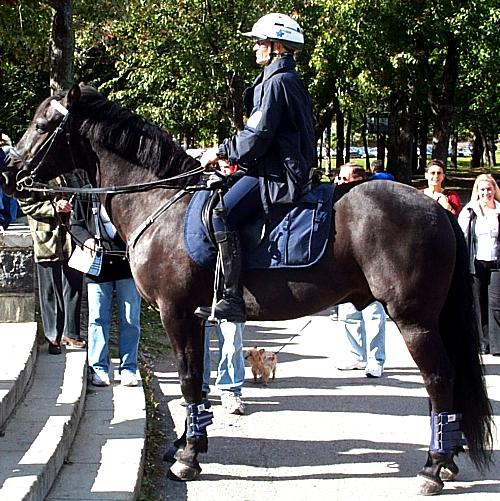
A horse equipped with a saddle for mounted police

Saddles are seats for the rider, fastened to the horse's back by means of a girth in English-style riding, or a cinch in the use of Western tack. Girths are generally a wide strap that goes around the horse at a point about four inches behind the forelegs. Some western saddles will also have a second strap known as a flank or back cinch that fastens at the rear of the saddle and goes around the widest part of the horse's belly.

It is important that the saddle be comfortable for both the rider and the horse as an improperly fitting saddle may create pressure points on the horse's back muscle (Latissimus dorsi) and cause the horse pain and can lead to the horse, rider, or both getting injured.

There are many types of saddle, each specially designed for its given task. Saddles are usually divided into two major categories: "English saddles" and "Western saddles" according to the riding discipline they are used in. Other types of saddles, such as racing saddles, Australian saddles, sidesaddles and endurance saddles do not necessarily fit neatly in either category.

=== Saddle accessories ===
- Breastplate or breastcollar: Prevents saddles of all styles from sliding sideways or backward on a horse's back
- Surcingle
- Crupper
- Breeching, also called "britching"
- Saddle blanket or numnah

=== Stirrups ===
Stirrups are supports for the rider's feet that hang down on either side of the saddle. They provide greater stability for the rider but can have safety concerns due to the potential for a rider's feet to get stuck in them. If a rider is thrown from a horse but has a foot caught in the stirrup, they could be dragged if the horse runs away. To minimize this risk, a number of safety precautions are taken. First, most riders wear riding boots with a heel and a smooth sole. Next, some saddles, particularly English saddles, have safety bars that allow a stirrup leather to fall off the saddle if pulled backwards by a falling rider. Other precautions are done with stirrup design itself. Western saddles have wide stirrup treads that make it more difficult for the foot to become trapped. A number of saddle styles incorporate a tapedero, which is a covering over the front of the stirrup that keeps the foot from sliding all the way through the stirrup. The English stirrup (or "iron") has several design variations which are either shaped to allow the rider's foot to slip out easily or are closed with a very heavy rubber band. The invention of stirrups was of great historic significance in mounted combat, giving the rider secure foot support while on horseback.

== Headgear ==
Bridles, hackamores, halters, or headcollars, and similar equipment consist of various arrangements of straps around the horse's head, and are used for communication with the animal, to show it where to go and when to stop/start.

=== Halters ===
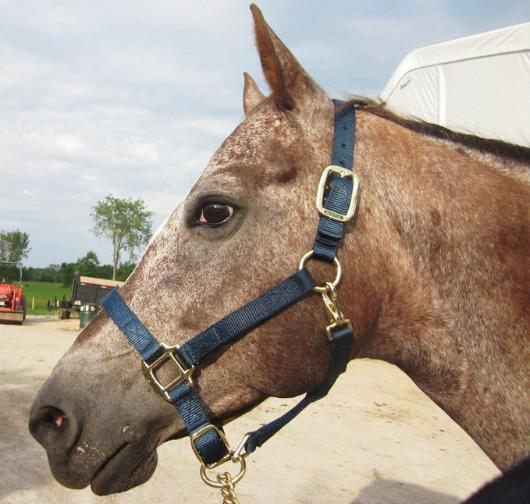
A nylon halter/headcollar

A halter (United States) or headcollar (United Kingdom) (occasionally headstall) consists of a noseband and headstall that buckles around the horse's head and allows the horse to be led or tied. The lead rope is separate, and it may be short (from six to ten feet, two to three meters) for everyday leading and tying, or much longer (up to 25 feet (7.6 m), eight meters) for tasks such as for leading packhorses or for picketing a horse out to graze.

Some horses, particularly stallions, may have a chain attached to the lead rope and placed over the nose or under the jaw to increase the control provided by a halter while being led by using stronger pressure. A chain must never be used on a tied up horse, for if it was to pull back suddenly the chain would severely damage the horses face. Most of the time, horses are not ridden with a halter, as it offers insufficient precision and communication, unless the horse is trained to be ridden that way. Halters have no bit.

In Australian and British English, a halter is a rope with a spliced running loop around the nose and another over the poll, used mainly for unbroken horses or for cattle. The lead rope cannot be removed from the halter. A show halter is made from rolled leather and the lead attaches to form the chinpiece of the noseband. These halters are not suitable for paddock usage or in loose stalls. An underhalter is a lightweight halter or headcollar which is made with only one small buckle, and can be worn under a bridle for tethering a horse without untacking.

=== Bridles ===
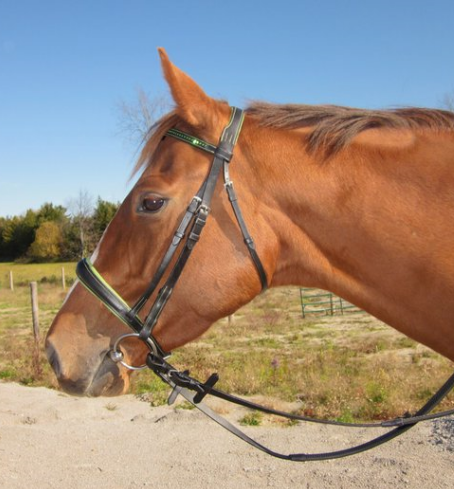
An English bridle with cavesson noseband

Bridles usually have a bit attached to reins and are used for riding and driving horses.

English Bridles are available with many different types of noseband and are usually seen in English riding. Their reins are buckled to one another, and they have little adornment or flashy hardware.

Western Bridles used in Western riding usually have no noseband, are made of thin bridle leather. They may have long, separated "Split" reins or shorter closed reins, which sometimes include an attached Romal. Western bridles are often adorned with silver or other decorative features.

Double bridles are a type of English bridle that use two bits in the mouth at once, a snaffle and a curb. The two bits allow the rider to have very precise communication with the horse. As a rule, only very advanced horses and riders use double bridles, because the pressure from the curb bit can be very strong. Double bridles are usually seen in the top levels of dressage, but also are seen in certain types of show hack and Saddle seat competition.

=== Hackamores and other bitless designs ===
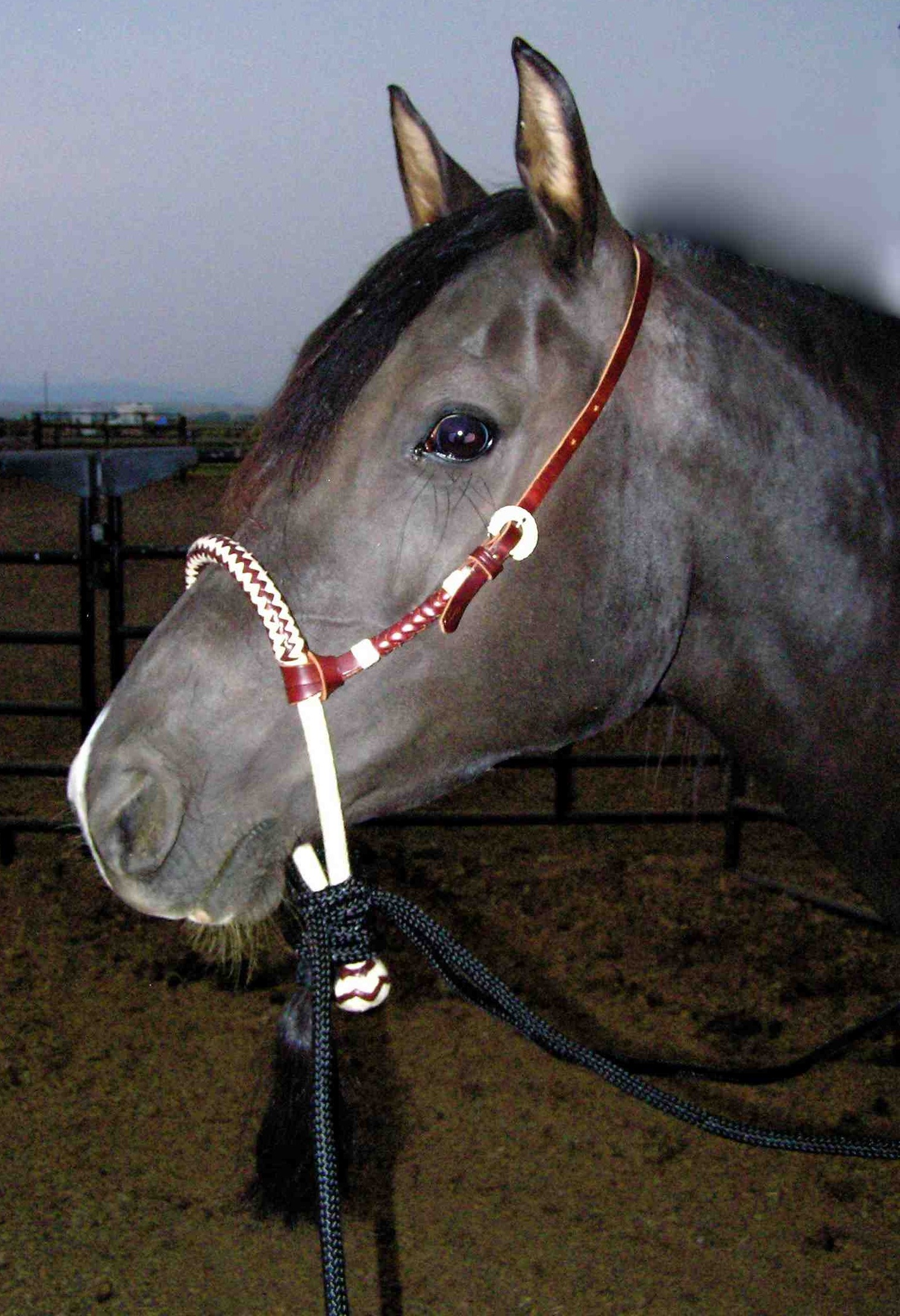
A bosal hackamore

A hackamore is a headgear that utilizes a heavy noseband of some sort, rather than a bit, most often used to train young horses or to go easy on an older horse's mouth. Hackamores are more often seen in western riding. Some related styles of headgear that control a horse with a noseband rather than a bit are known as bitless bridles.

The word "hackamore" is derived from the Spanish word jáquima. Hackamores are seen in western riding disciplines, as well as in endurance riding and English riding disciplines such as show jumping and the stadium phase of eventing. While the classic bosal-style hackamore is usually used to start young horses, other designs, such as various bitless bridles and the mechanical hackamore, are often seen on mature horses with dental issues that make bit use painful, horses with certain training problems, and on horses with mouth or tongue injuries. Some riders also like to use them in the winter to avoid putting a frozen metal bit into a horse's mouth.

Like bitted bridles, noseband-based designs can be gentle or harsh, depending on the hands of the rider. It is a myth that a bit is cruel and a hackamore is gentler. The horse's face is very soft and sensitive with many nerve endings. Misuse of a hackamore can cause swelling on the nose, scraping on the nose and jawbone, and extreme misuse may cause damage to the bones and cartilage of the horse's head.

=== Other headgear ===
A longeing cavesson (UK: lungeing) is a special type of halter or noseband used for longeing a horse. Longeing is the activity of having a horse walk, trot and/or canter in a large circle around the handler at the end of a rope that is 25 to 30 feet (9.1 m) long. It is used for training and exercise.

A neck rope or cordeo is a rope tied around a horse's neck used to guide the horse during bridleless riding or groundwork.

== Reins ==
Reins consist of leather straps or rope attached to the outer ends of a bit and extend to the rider's or driver's hands. Reins are the means by which a horse rider or driver communicates directional commands to the horse's head. Pulling on the reins can be used to steer or stop the horse. The sides of a horse's mouth are sensitive, so pulling on the reins pulls the bit, which then pulls the horse's head from side to side, which is how the horse is controlled.

On some types of harnesses there might be supporting rings to carry the reins over the horse's back. When pairs of horses are used in drawing a wagon or coach it is usual for the outer side of each pair to be connected to reins and the inside of the bits connected by a short bridging strap or rope. The driver carries "four-in-hand" or "six-in-hand" being the number of reins connecting to the pairs of horses.

A rein may be attached to a halter to lead or guide the horse in a circle for training purposes or to lead a packhorse, but a simple lead rope is more often used for these purposes. A longe line is sometimes called a "longe rein", but it is actually a flat line about 30 feet (9.1 m) long, usually made of nylon or cotton web, about one inch wide, thus longer and wider than even a driving rein.

== Bits ==
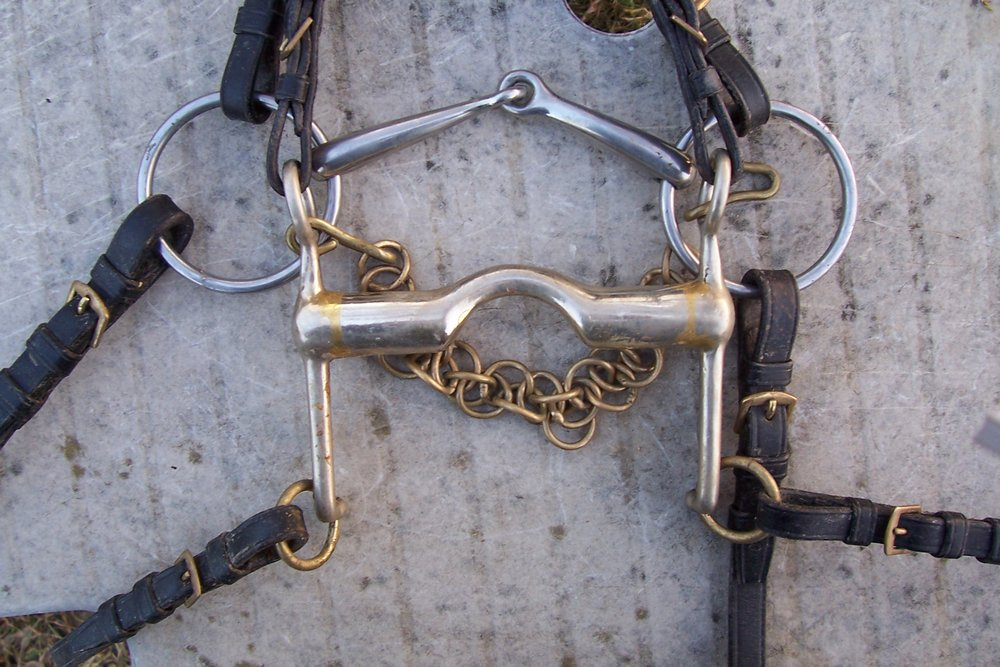
A curb and snaffle bit shown together on a double bridle

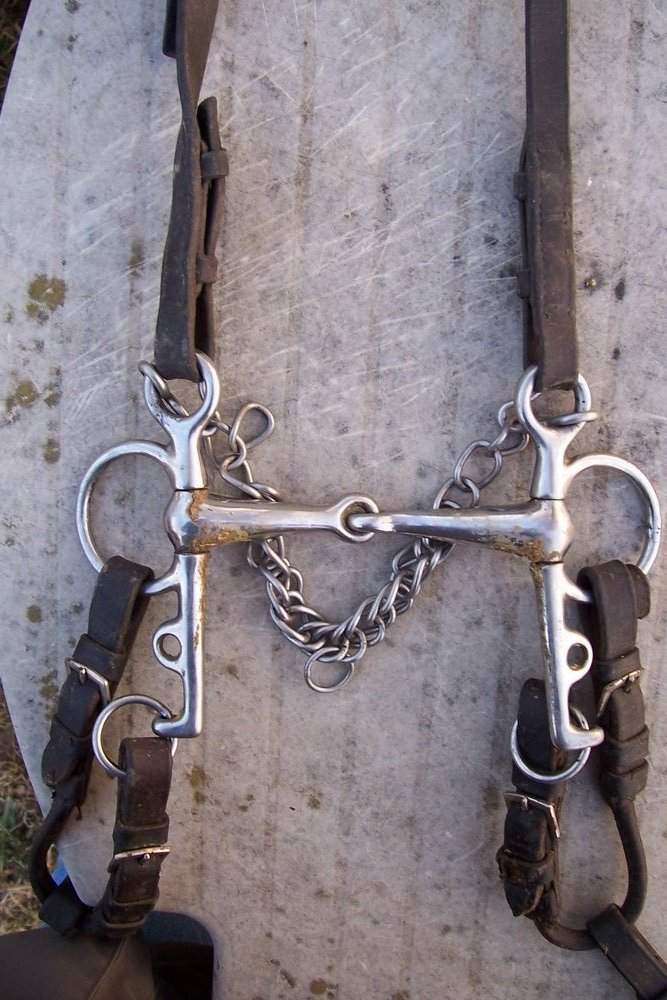
A pelham bit with a jointed mouthpiece

A bit is a device placed in a horse's mouth, kept on a horse's head by means of a headstall. There are many types, each useful for specific types of riding and training.

The mouthpiece of the bit does not rest on the teeth of the horse, but rather rests on the gums or "bars" of the horse's mouth in an interdental space behind the front incisors and in front of the back molars. It is important that the style of bit is appropriate to the horse's needs and is fitted properly for it to function properly and be as comfortable as possible for the horse.

The basic "classic" styles of bits are:

- Curb bit
- Snaffle bit
- Pelham bit
- Weymouth or Double Bridle

While there are literally hundreds of types of bit mouthpieces, bit rings and bit shanks, essentially there are really only two broad categories: direct pressure bits, broadly termed snaffle bits; and leverage bits, usually termed curbs.

Bits that act with direct pressure on the tongue and lips of the bit are in the general category of snaffle bits. Snaffle bits commonly have a single jointed mouthpiece and act with a nutcracker effect on the bars, tongue and occasionally roof of the mouth. However, regardless of mouthpiece, any bit that operates only on direct pressure is a "snaffle" bit.

Leverage bits have shanks coming off the mouthpiece to create leverage that applies pressure to the poll, chin groove and mouth of the horse are in the category of curb bits. Any bit with shanks that works off of leverage is a "curb" bit, regardless of whether the mouthpiece is solid or jointed.

Some combination or hybrid bits combine direct pressure and leverage, such as the Kimblewick or Kimberwicke, which adds slight leverage to a two-rein design that resembles a snaffle; and the four rein designs such as the single mouthpiece Pelham bit and the double bridle, which places a curb and a snaffle bit simultaneously in the horse's mouth.

In the wrong hands even the mildest bit can hurt the horse. Conversely, a very severe bit, in the right hands, can transmit subtle commands that cause no pain to the horse. Bit commands should be given with only the quietest movements of the hands, and much steering and stopping should be done with the legs and seat.

== Harness ==
A horse harness is a set of devices and straps that attaches a horse to a cart, carriage, sledge or any other load. There are two main styles of harnesses - breaststrap and collar and hames style. These differ in how the weight of the load is attached. Most Harnesses are made from leather, which is the traditional material for harnesses, though some designs are now made of nylon webbing or synthetic biothane.

A breaststrap harness has a wide leather strap going horizontally across the horses' breast, attached to the traces and then to the load. This is used only for lighter loads. A collar and hames harness has a collar around the horses' neck with wood or metal hames in the collar. The traces attach from the hames to the load. This type of harness is needed for heavy draft work.

Both types will also have a bridle and reins. A harness that is used to support shafts, such as on a cart pulled by a single horse, will also have a saddle attached to the harness to help the horse support the shafts and breeching to brake the forward motion of the vehicle, especially when stopping or moving downhill. Horses guiding vehicles by means of a pole, such as two-horse teams pulling a wagon, a hay-mower, or a dray, will have pole-straps attached to the lower part of the horse collar.

== Breastplates and martingales ==
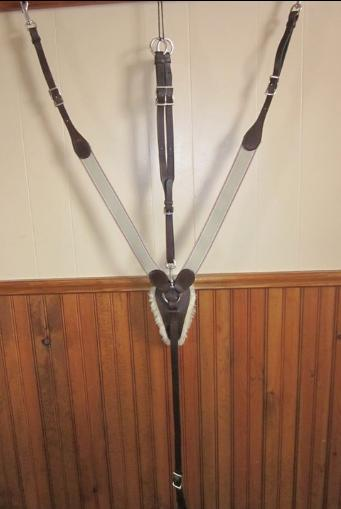
An English-style breastplate with elastic and a running martingale attachment

Breastplates, breastcollars or breastgirths attach to the front of the saddle, cross the horse's chest, and usually have a strap that runs between the horse's front legs and attaches to the girth. They keep the saddle from sliding back or sideways. They are usually seen in demanding, fast-paced sports. They are crucial pieces of safety equipment for English riding activities requiring jumping, such as eventing, show jumping, polo, and fox hunting. They are also seen in Western riding events, particularly in rodeo, reining and cutting, where it is particularly important to prevent a saddle from shifting. They may also be worn in other horse show classes for decorative purposes.

A martingale is a piece of equipment that keeps a horse from raising its head too high. Various styles can be used as a control measure, to prevent the horse from avoiding rider commands by raising its head out of position; or as a safety measure to keep the horse from tossing its head high or hard enough to smack its rider in the face.

They are allowed in many types of competition, especially those where speed or jumping may be required, but are not allowed in most "flat" classes at horse shows, though an exception is made in a few classes limited exclusively to young or "green" horses who may not yet be fully trained.

Martingales are usually attached to the horse one of two ways. They are either attached to the center chest ring of a breastplate or, if no breastplate is worn, they are attached by two straps, one that goes around the horse's neck, and the other that attaches to the girth, with the martingale itself beginning at the point in the center of the chest where the neck and girth straps intersect.

Martingale types include the standing martingale, running, German, Market Harborough, and Irish.

There are other training devices that fall loosely in the martingale category, in that they use straps attached to the reins or bit which limit the movement of the horse's head or add leverage to the rider's hands in order to control the horse's head. Common devices of this nature include the overcheck, the chambon, de Gogue, grazing reins, draw reins and the "bitting harness" or "bitting rig". However, most of this equipment is used for training purposes and is not legal in any competition. In some disciplines, use of leverage devices, even in training, is controversial.

== Associated equipment ==
- Crop
- Spurs
- Leg protection
- Horseshoe
- Hoof boot
- Blinkers and blinders

== See also ==
- Glossary of equestrian terms
- Glossary of carriage and driving terminology
- Barding
- Equestrian helmet
- Riding boot
