= Stirrup strap =

Piece of leather attached to saddle

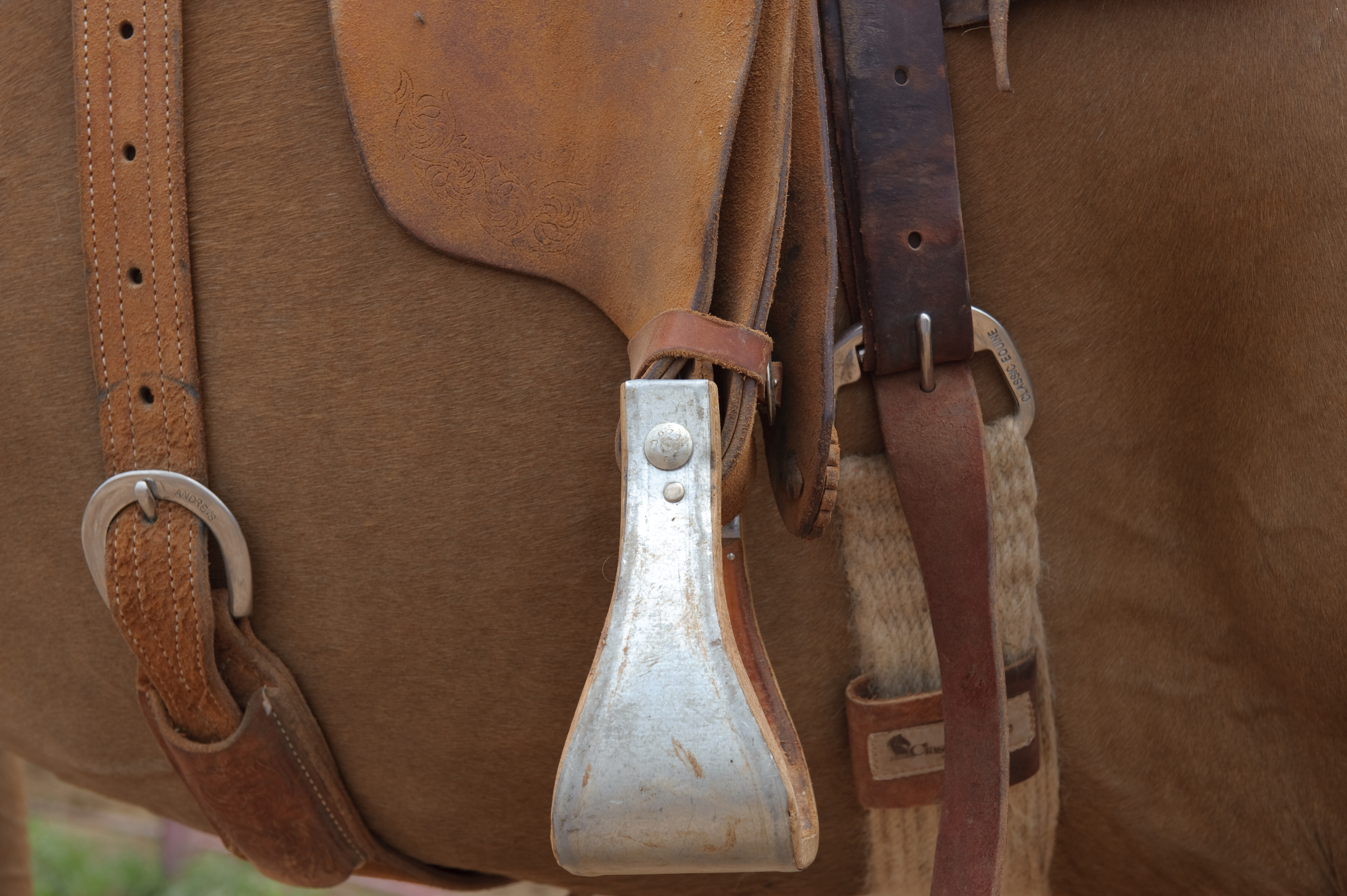
Stirrup hanged from the corresponding stirrup strap.

A stirrup strap or stirrup leather is a piece of leather or other material, that, attached to the saddle, holds the stirrup at its lower end. Each saddle has two stirrups and two stirrup straps.

The upper end of the stirrup strap is attached to the saddle and the lower end attached to the stirrup. Many systems are possible for such unions, modern solutions use buckles (see image).

== History ==
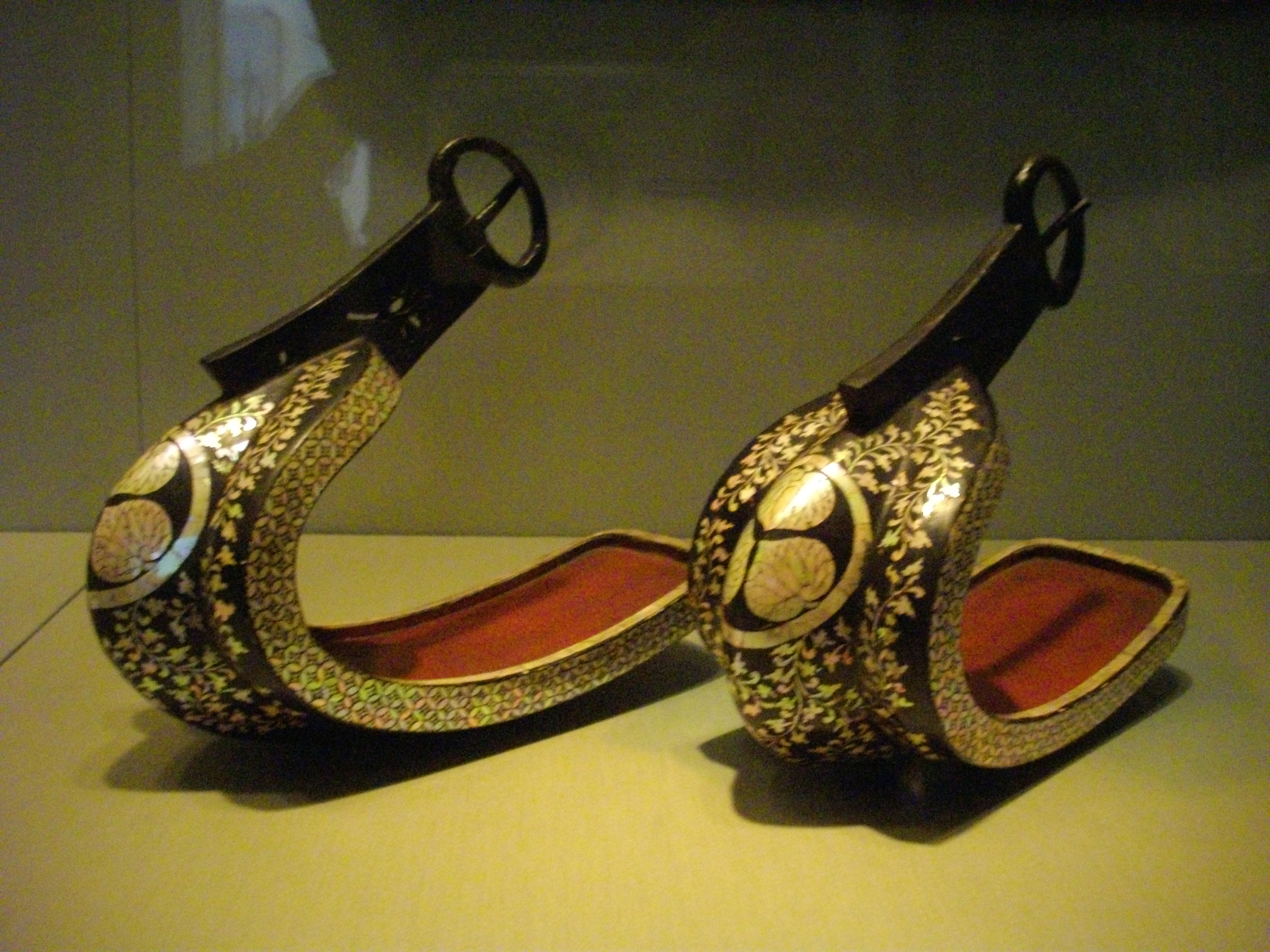
Abumi: Japanese stirrups. See the buckles to attach them to the stirrup straps.

The first stirrups consisted of a rope that joined the saddle with the rider's big toe. They appeared in the Kushan empire (present-day India ) between the 1st and 2nd centuries BC. From there they moved to China around the year 300, where, due to the colder climate of the area, they began to tie shoes around the foot, and not just over the toe. Shortly after, the original rope was replaced with iron pieces.

From China the use of the stirrup spread to the Mongol nomads of Central Asia, Korea and Japan. The Huns introduced them to Persia in the IV and to Europe around the V, although there is no news of their adoption by the Roman imperial cavalry until approximately a century later (after the fall of the Western Roman Empire ). Around the year 600 AD. C., the Avars of Pannonia had been pushed west from the steppes by the Turks, and introduced the stirrup into Europe. In their turn, the Arabs had taken it from the Persians and the Eastern Romans.

For their part, the Germanic invaders of the Roman Empire quickly adopted the use of stirrups. This improved the effectiveness of his mounted troops to such an extent that it facilitated the defeat of the classical model of the Roman legion, at the Battle of Adrianople (378), which caused an unprecedented military crisis. The stirrup, which allowed the rider to fight comfortably and maximized the impact of the charge, had practically retired the best army in history, beginning a new era in Europe: that of the cavalry corps that would dominate the medieval battlefields for more than a thousand years. (Outside of some particular case such as that of the Almogávares).

== Riding styles ==
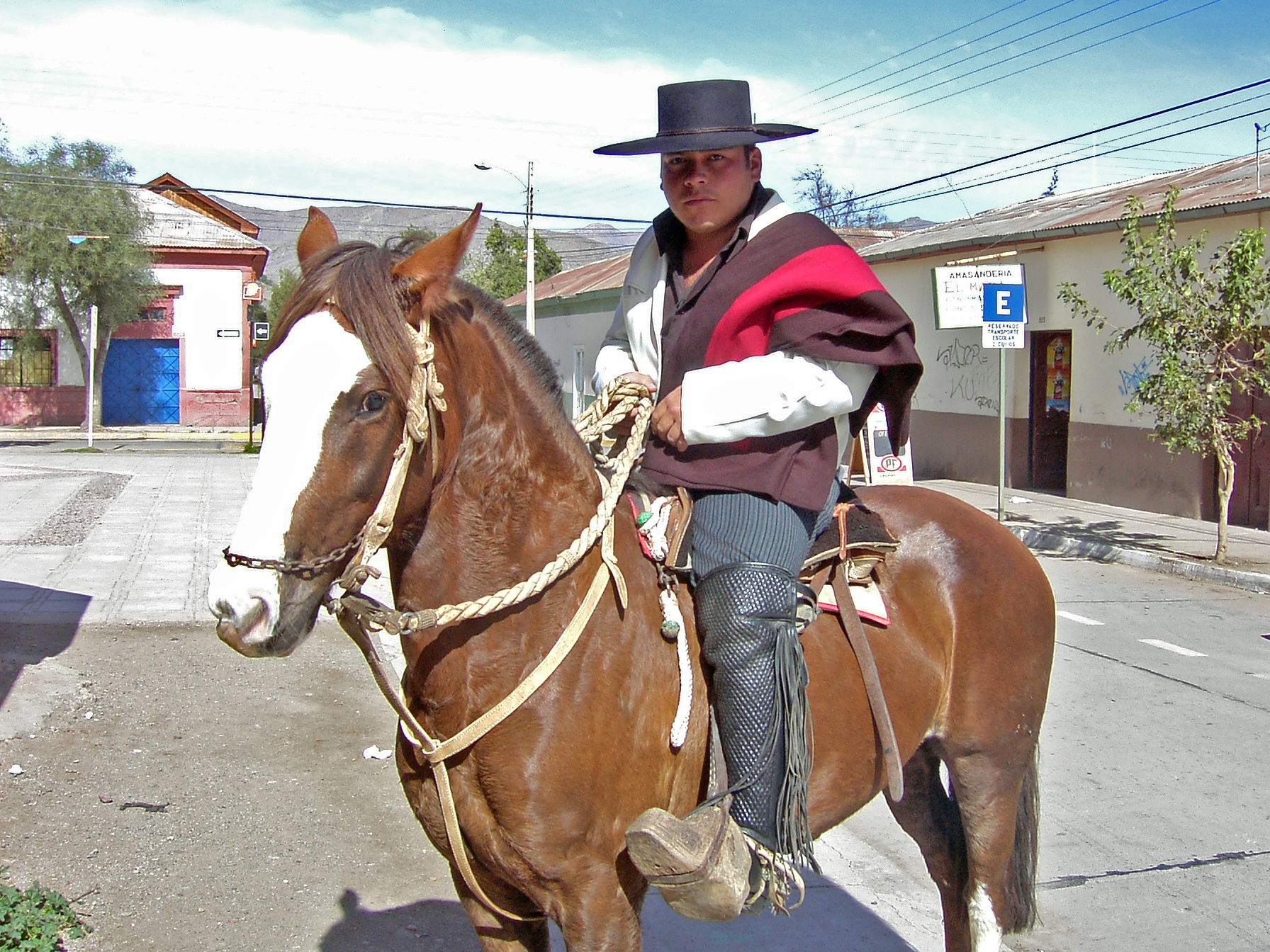
Chilean rider dressed as a huaso.

Among the various riding systems, it is worth considering the type of saddle and the stirrups and stirrup straps used in each case. In the styles mentioned below, the expressions "In the style of xx..." or "At the xx way", must be added to the style name.

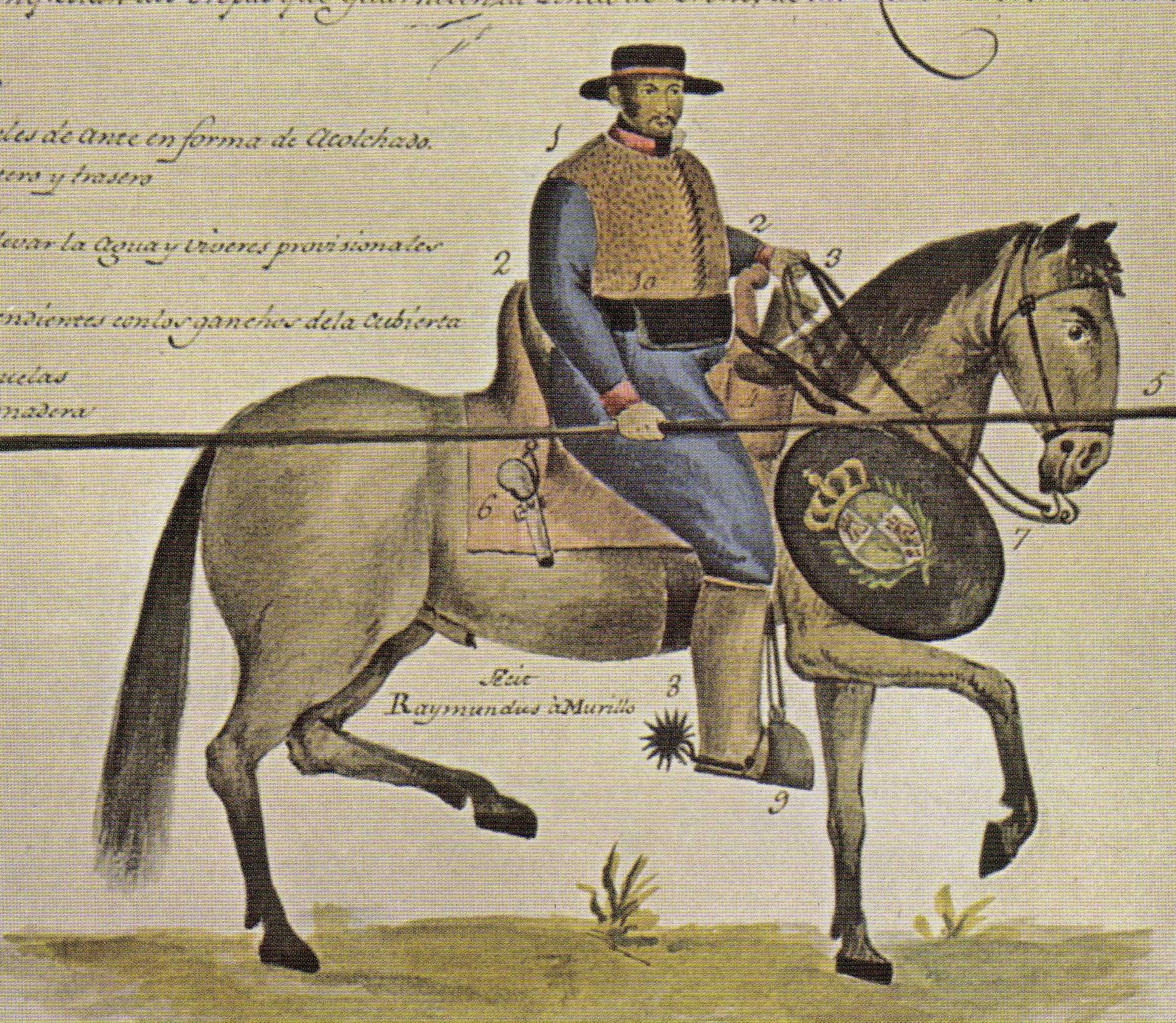
Soldado de cuera 1: Seven Layer Leather Jacket 2: Saddle knob 3: Carbine 4: Saddle bag 5: Spear 6: Guns hanging on each side of the saddle 7: Broquer 8: Boots and spurs 9: Wooden stirrups 10: Cartridge box

- Bridle. Bridle riding was based on wearing the stirrups long, with the nails adjusted to allow the rider to ride with his legs straightened. (In Spanish "a la brida" or "a la guisa" were equivalent expressions).
- Gineta
- Bastarda
- Estradiote
- Soldado de cuera. See image.
  - The stirrups were made of wood and closed to protect the rider's foot.
- Comanche
- Mexican.
- Chilean Creole. Chilean horse.
- Argentine Creole
- Californian
- Texan
- Japanish.

== Length ==
The length of the stirrup straps depends on the desired height of the stirrups. There are fixed length actions and adjustable length actions. Some saddles allow the actions to be adjusted with the rider mounted.

The length of the stirrup strap will be correct when, with the rider standing on both stirrups, there is a space of four or five inches between the groin and the seat of the saddle. All other measures are uncertain for the cavalry soldier. The stirrup must not bear more weight than the leg: the foot must fit a third part in the stirrup, with the heel slightly lower than the tip of the foot.

— Reglamento para el ejercicio y maniobras de la caballeria...Ministerio de la Guerra. España.
