= Pa'u riders =

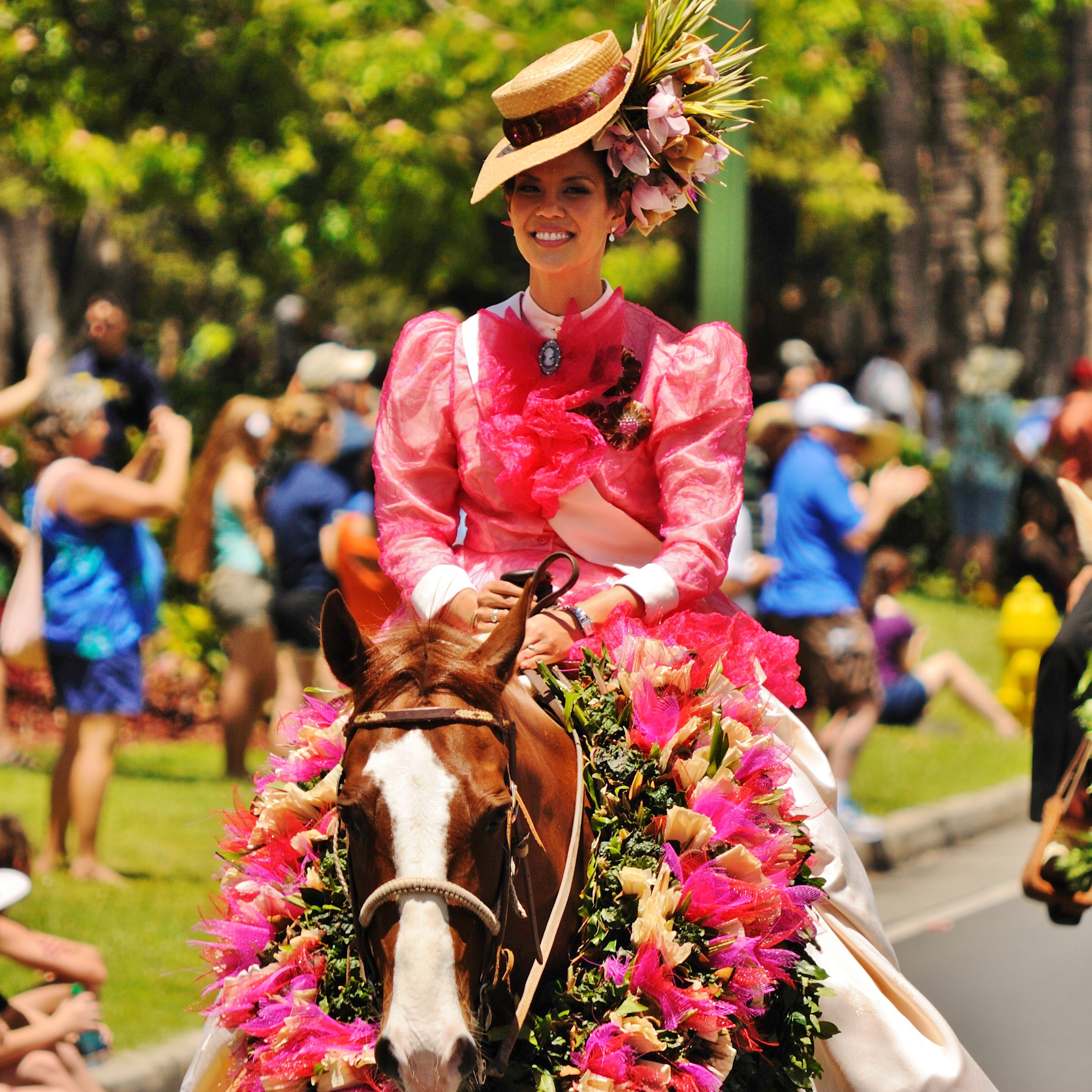
A Pa'u queen

Pa'u riders (pronounced pah-oo riders), (sometimes written as pa-u riders), are wahine (Hawaiian for 'women') horseback riders who wear long, colorful skirts (Hawaiian: pāʻū) and characteristically ride astride, rather than sidesaddle. This equestrian tradition's roots are from the early 19th century, when horses were introduced to Hawaii and aliʻi women dressed up to ride for formal occasions. It declined after the overthrow of the Kingdom of Hawaii, but was revitalized in the early 20th century with the establishment of formal riding organizations called Pa'u Riders. Today, they participate in Kamehameha Day floral parades and other parades and festivals throughout the islands.

== History ==
The pa'u riding tradition began just after Captain Richard J. Cleveland introduced horses to Hawaii in 1803. Kamehameha disliked the creatures, partially on account of the amount of food they required, so western sailors began riding them along the beaches to demonstrate their capabilities. Hawaiian men and women quickly took to riding, establishing a long equestrian tradition that also includes the paniolo, the Hawaiian cowboy. As the early Western visitors to Hawaii were men, rather than women who might have introduced sidesaddle riding, Hawaiian women joined the men in learning to ride astride. Additionally, Hawaii soon established trade connections with Central and South America, where women often rode astride. This contact may have influenced the development of riding customs and dress among Hawaiian women.

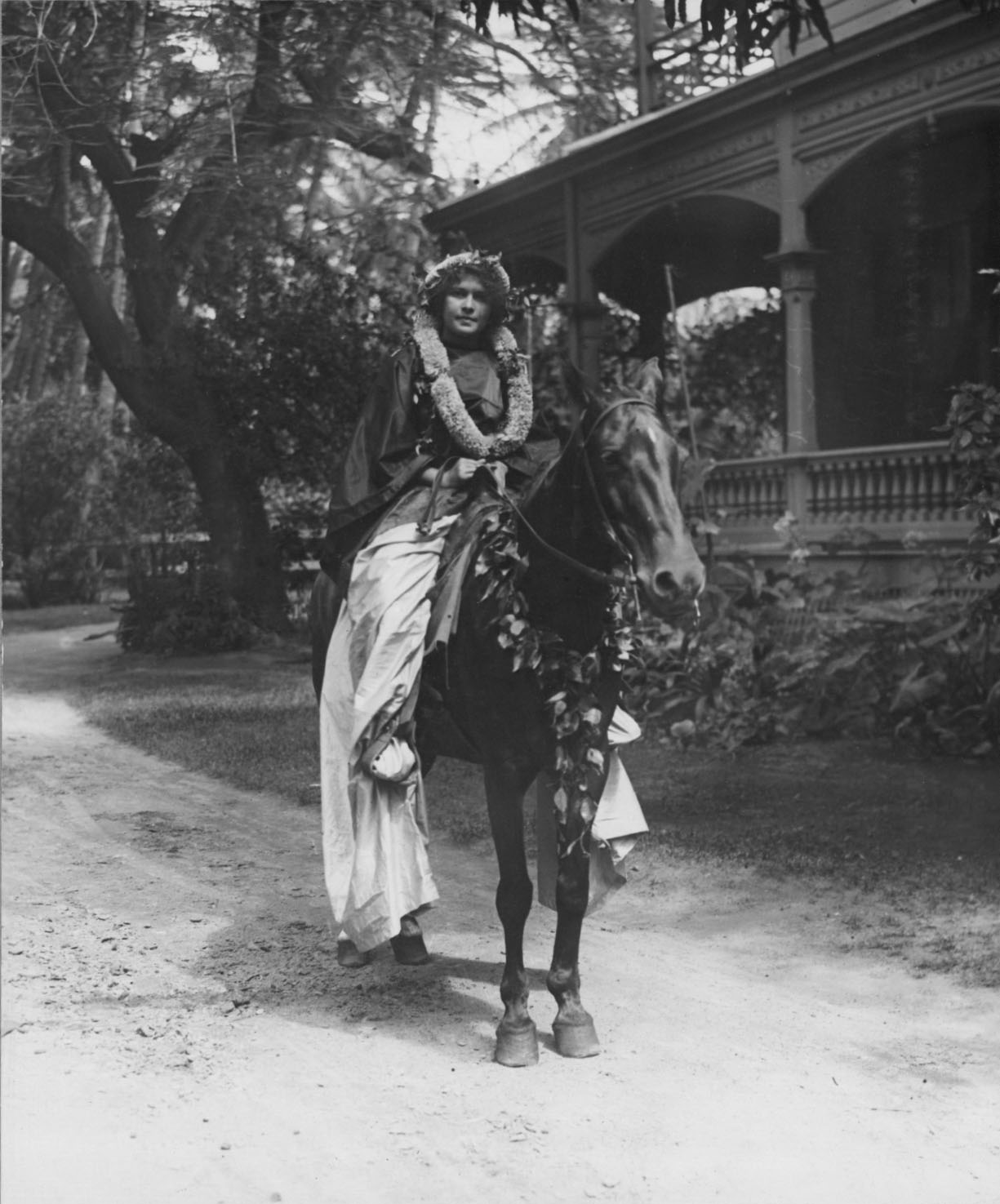
Adele Kauilani Robinson Lemke as a Pa'u Rider in her long skirt, 1913

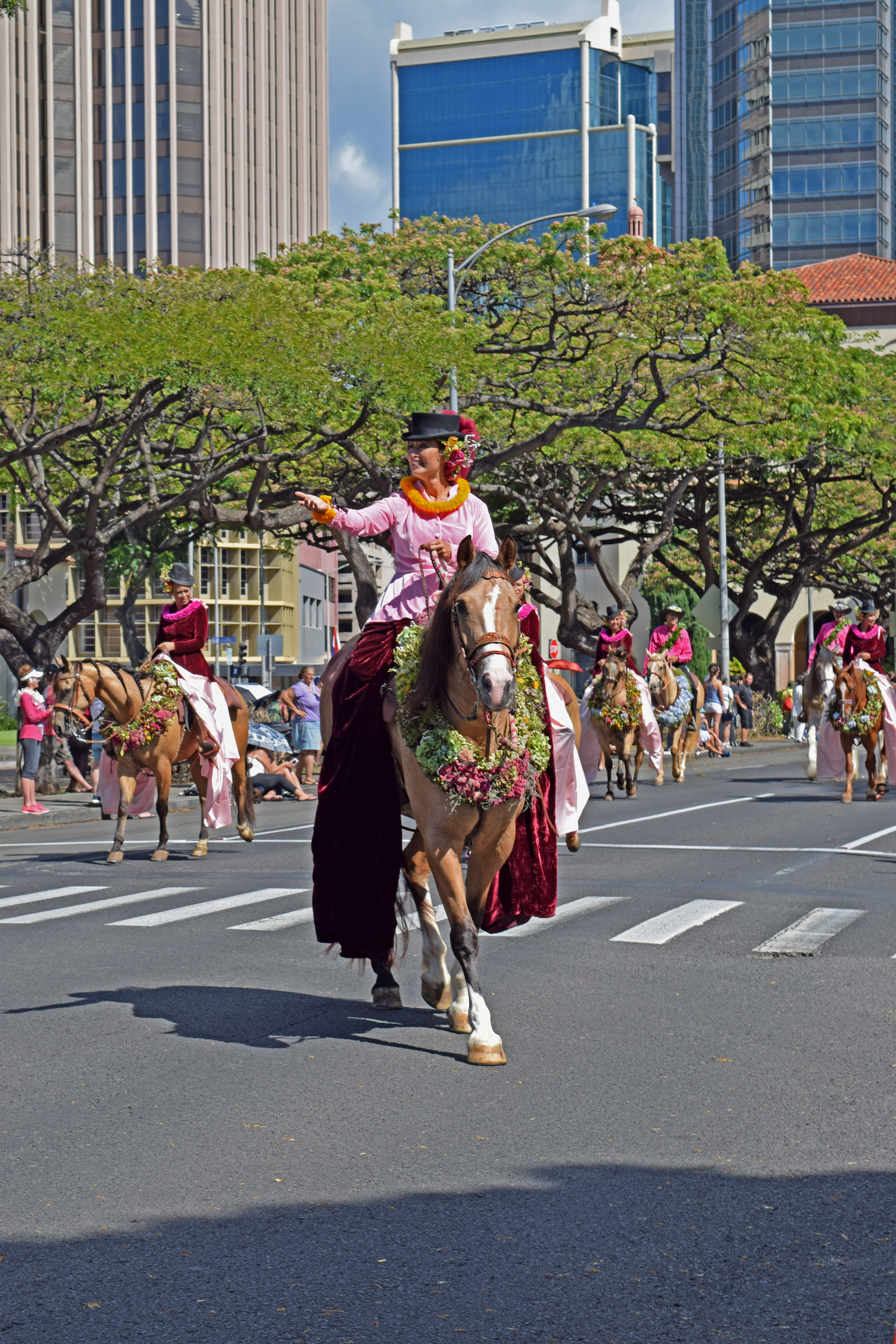
The Pa'u Queen of the 100th Anniversary Kamehameha Day Floral Parade. June 11, 2016

The term pāʻū means skirt in the Hawaiian language. Riders initially began wearing long skirts to protect their legs while traveling. Over time, as the riders took part in performances and displays, their outfits became more elaborate and elegant. English writer Isabella Bird visited Hawaii in 1873 and noted women riding astride, a notable difference from European custom.

As the Kingdom declined, so did this tradition. Attempts were made by the monarchy to revive the custom but were unsuccessful. In 1906, Lizzie Puahi organized the first association of women riders for a floral auto parade. Puahi began the Pa'u Rider's Club from her residence in Waikiki, Oahu, and began holding monthly gatherings. They recruited other women and practiced equestrianism. Soon afterwards, Theresa Wilcox began a riding society. Today, Pa'u riders are commonly seen in festivals and parades across Hawaii.

The word pa'u has two syllables: the vowels are separated by a glottal stop, which is indicated in written Hawaiian by an apostrophe (or an ʻokina).

In 1917 Jack London wrote in his work The Cruise of the Snark:

"Then there were the pa-u riders, thirty or forty of them, Hawaiian women all, superb horsewomen dressed gorgeously in the old, native riding costume, and dashing about in twos and threes and groups. In the afternoon Charmian and I stood in the judge's stand and awarded the prizes for horsemanship and costume to the pa-u riders".
