= Stirrup =

Light frame or ring that holds the foot of a rider

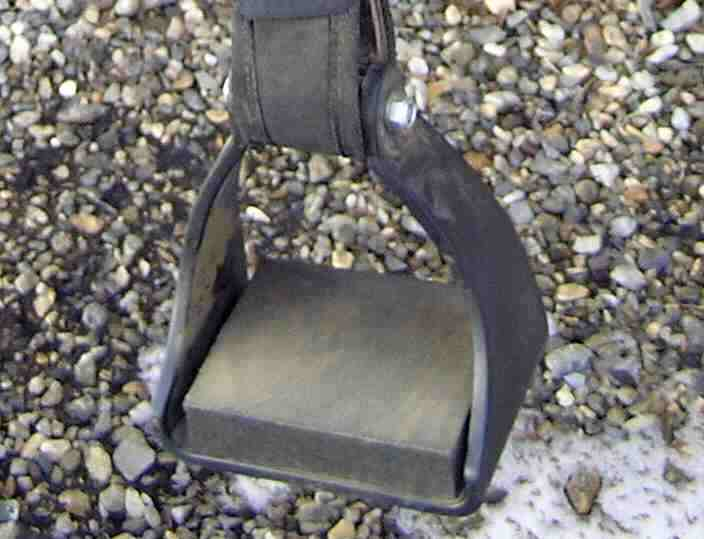
A modern working stirrup on an endurance riding saddle

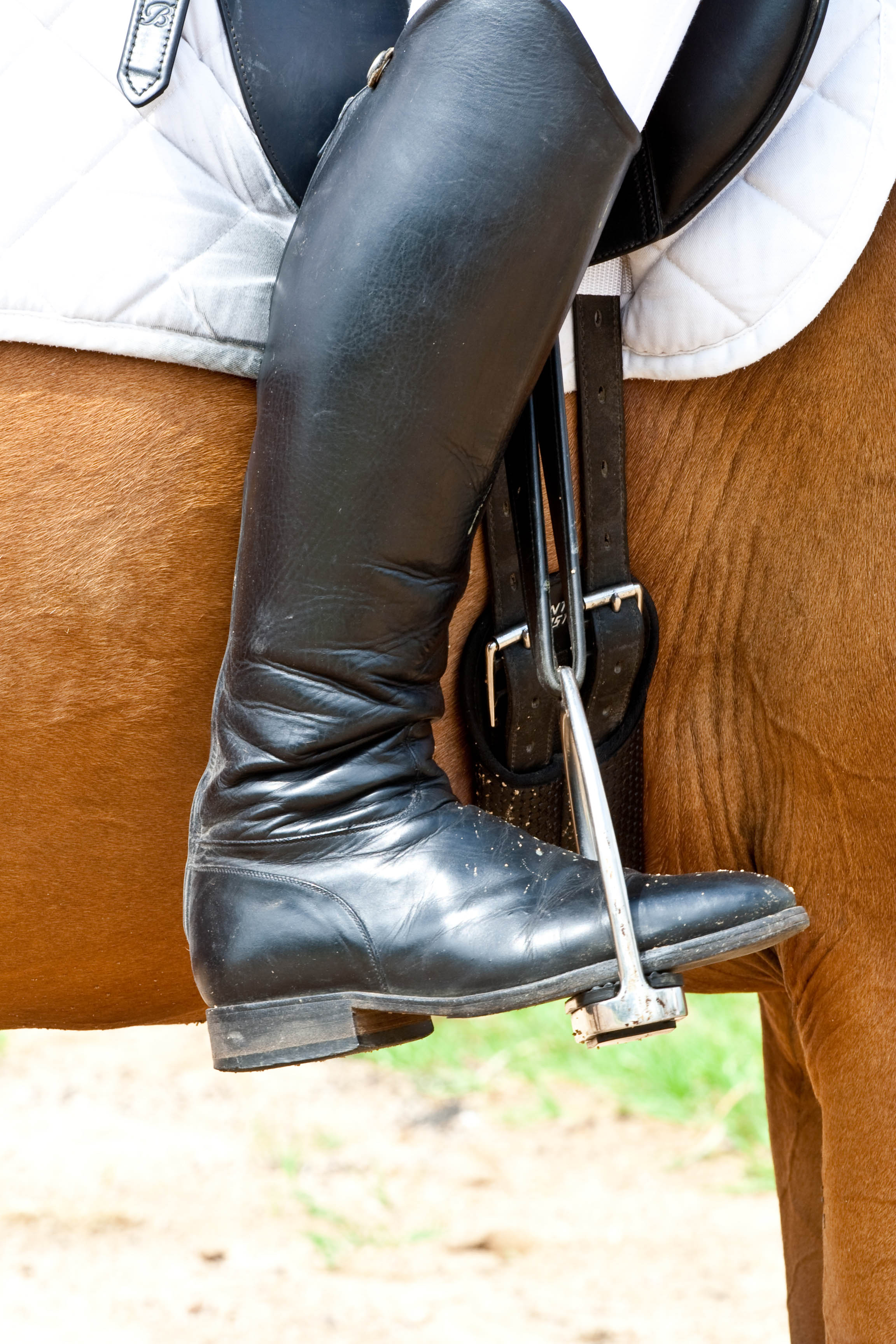
Typical metal stirrup used in English riding

A stirrup is one of a pair of light frames or rings attached to the saddle of a riding animal (usually a horse or other equine, such as a mule) by a strap (often called a stirrup leather) that holds its rider's foot, aiding in their mounting and support. They greatly increase the rider's ability to stay in the saddle and control the mount, increasing the animal's usefulness to humans in areas such as communication, transportation, and warfare.

In antiquity, the earliest foot supports consisted of riders placing their feet under a girth or using a simple toe loop appearing in India by the 2nd century BC. Later, a single foot support was used as a mounting aid, and paired stirrups appeared after the invention of the treed saddle. The stirrup was invented in the Chinese Jin dynasty during the 4th century, was in common use throughout China by the 5th century, and was spread across Eurasia to Europe through the nomadic peoples of Central Eurasia by the 7th or 8th century.

== Etymology ==
The English word "stirrup" stems from Old English stirap or stigrap "mounting rope" compounding stiġ lit. “to ascend" (cf. obsolete verb sty) and rāp "rope".

== History ==
The stirrup, which gives greater stability to a rider, has been described as one of the most significant inventions in the history of warfare, prior to gunpowder. As a tool allowing expanded use of horses in warfare, the stirrup is often called the third revolutionary step in equipment, after the chariot and the saddle. The basic tactics of mounted warfare were significantly altered by the stirrup. A rider supported by stirrups was less likely to fall off while fighting, and could deliver a blow with a weapon that more fully employed the weight and momentum of horse and rider. Among other advantages, stirrups provided greater balance and support to the rider, which allowed the knight to use a sword more efficiently without falling, especially against infantry adversaries. Contrary to common modern belief, however, it has been asserted that stirrups actually did not enable the horseman to use a lance more effectively (cataphracts had used lances since antiquity), though the cantled saddle did.

=== Precursors ===
==== Soft stirrups ====
The stirrup was invented relatively late in history, considering that horses were domesticated in approximately 4000 BC, and the earliest known saddle-like equipment was fringed cloths or pads with breast pads and cruppers used by Assyrian cavalry around 700 BC.

The earliest hard foot support was a toe loop that held the big toe and was used in India late in the second century BC, though it may have appeared as early as 500 BC. This ancient foot support consisted of a looped rope for the big toe which was at the bottom of a saddle made of fibre or leather. Such a configuration was suitable for the warm climate of south and central India where people used to ride horses barefoot. Buddhist carvings in the temples of Sanchi, Mathura and the Bhaja caves dating back between the 1st and 2nd century BC feature horsemen riding with elaborate saddles with toes slipped under girths. Archaeologist John Marshall described the Sanchi relief as "the earliest example by some five centuries of the use of stirrups in any part of the world". This type of foot support has been called the "toe stirrup" in contrast to the later stirrup known as the "foot stirrup" seen in China during the 5th century AD. It is speculated that they may have spread to China and were the precursors of the "foot stirrup".

==== Hard stirrups ====
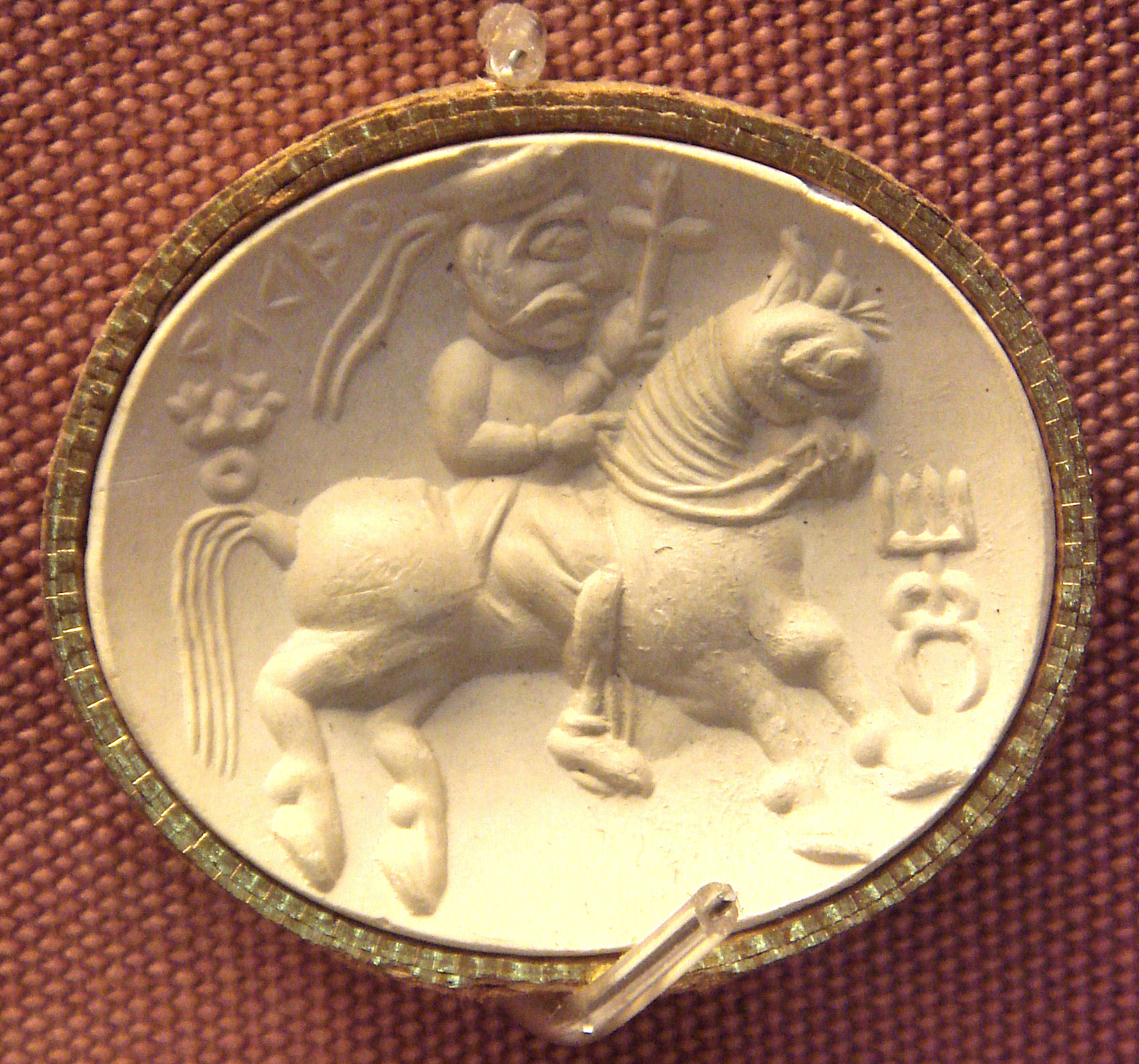
Depiction of a Kushan divinity using an early platform-style stirrup, circa AD 150; British Museum

Riders in Central and Southern Asia during the last century B.C. and the first century A.D. seem to have used toe loops and "hook stirrups," which featured a curved metal hook hanging from the saddle to support the foot. A pair of first century BC double bent iron bars, approximately 17 cm in length with curvature at each end, excavated from a grave near Junapani in the central Indian state of Madhya Pradesh, have been postulated as either full foot stirrups or bridle bits.

Some credit the nomadic Central Asian group known as the Sarmatians with developing the first stirrups.

The invention of the solid saddle tree allowed development of the true stirrup as it is known today. Without a solid tree, the rider's weight in the stirrups creates abnormal pressure points that make the horse's back sore. Modern thermography studies on "treeless" and flexible-tree saddle designs have found that there is considerable friction across the center line of a horse's back. A coin of Quintus Labienus, who was in service of Parthia, minted circa 39 BC depicts on its reverse a saddled horse with hanging objects. Smith suggests they are pendant cloths, while Thayer suggests that, considering the fact that the Parthians were famous for their mounted archery, the objects are stirrups, but adds that it is difficult to imagine why the Romans would never have adopted the technology.

=== East Asia ===
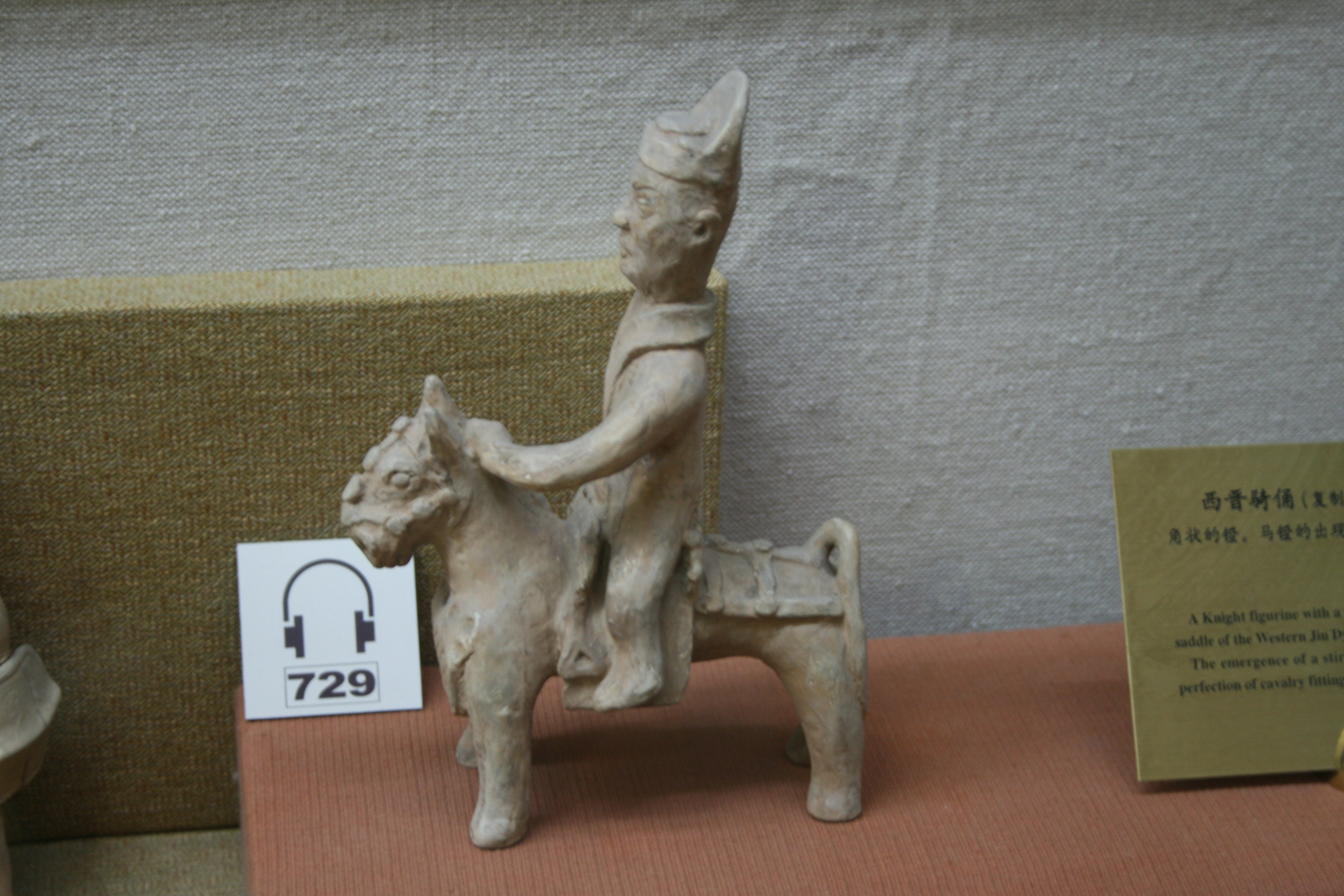
A funerary figurine with a mounting stirrup, dated AD 302, unearthed near Changsha

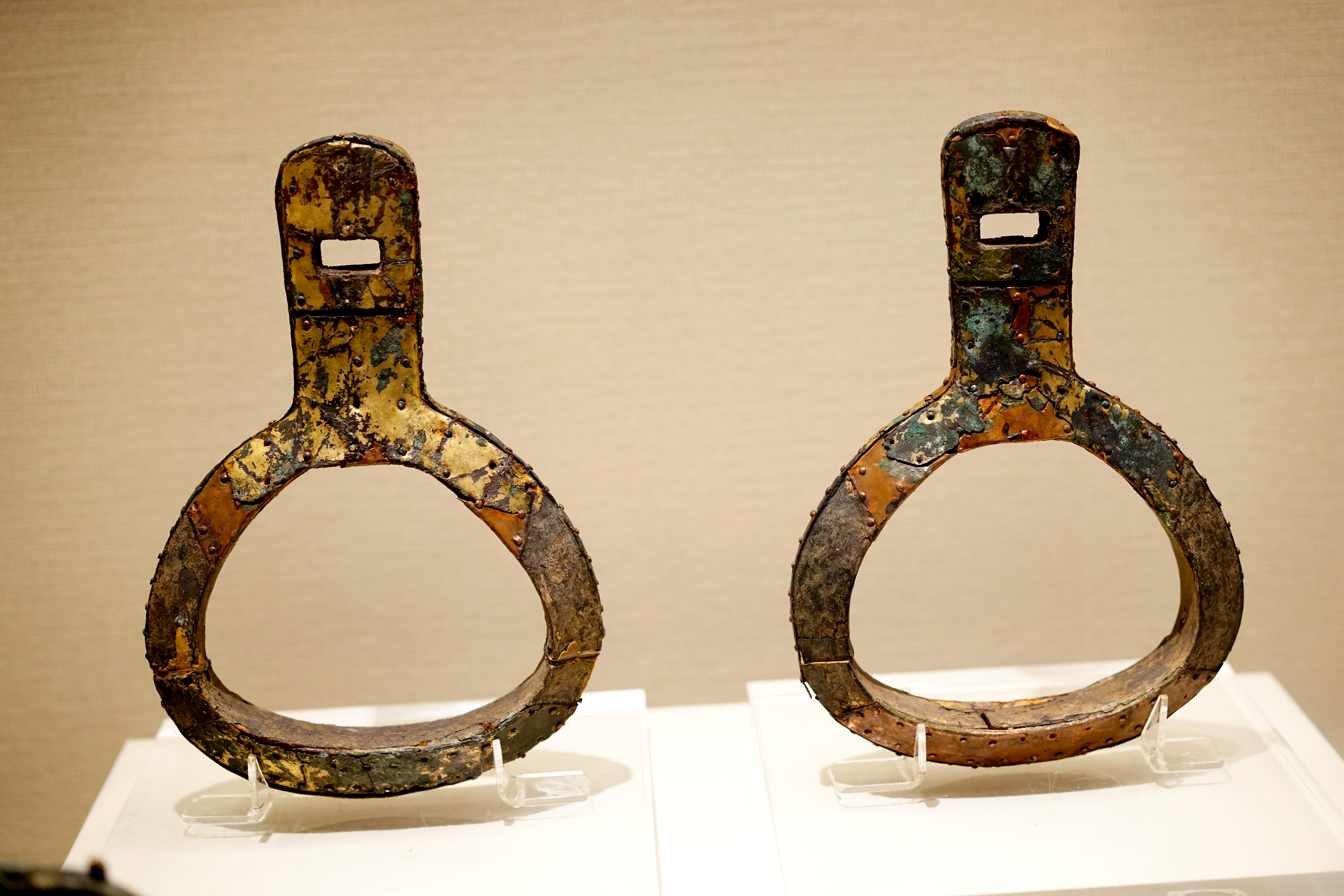
The earliest extant double stirrup, from the tomb of Feng Sufu, a Han Chinese nobleman from the Northern Yan dynasty, 415 AD, discovered in Beipiao, Liaoning

The Wenwu journal (1981) speculated that stirrups may have been used in China as early as the Han dynasty (206 BC – 220 AD) based on representations of horses believed to date to the Eastern Han period (25–220 AD). Two plaques depict horses with squares between their belly and base line, which has been speculated to represent stirrups. However in 1984, Yang Hong remarked in the same journal that the horses had no saddles and therefore the squares were only ornaments.

Excavations at Khukh Nuur in northern Mongolia discovered a single iron stirrup in a cave burial. Radiocarbon dating of the human bone associated with this stirrup produced a date of 243–405 AD. Another cave burial at Urd Ulaan Uneet in Khovd Province was discovered with a saddle that had bilateral straps attached midway through the saddle tree, strongly suggesting the existence of paired stirrups. Radiocarbon dating of a strap made with horse hide gives a date of 267–535 AD.

The earliest known paired stirrups first appeared in China during the Jin dynasty by the early 4th century AD. A funerary figurine depicting a stirrup dated 302 AD was unearthed from a Western Jin tomb near Changsha. The stirrup depicted is a mounting stirrup, only placed on one side of the horse, and too short for riding. The earliest reliable representation of a full-length, double-sided riding stirrup was also unearthed from a Jin tomb, this time near Nanjing, dating to the Eastern Jin period, 322 AD. The earliest extant double stirrups were discovered in the tomb of a Northern Yan noble, Feng Sufu, who died in 415 AD. These stirrups were made with mulberry wood gilded with bronze and iron plates. References to stirrups appeared in Chinese texts by the end of the 4th century. Stirrups have also been found in Goguryeo tombs dating to the 4th and 5th centuries AD, but these do not contain any specific date. The stirrup appears to have been in widespread use across China by 477 AD.

The appearance of the stirrup in China coincided with the rise of heavily armoured cavalry in the region. Dated to 357 AD, the tomb of Dong Shou shows fully armoured riders as well as horses. References to "iron cavalry" and "iron horse" began to appear at the same time and instances of captured horse armour in numbers as high as 5,000 and 10,000 are recorded. In addition to the stirrups, Feng Sufu's tomb also contained iron plates for lamellar armour. Armoured heavy cavalry would dominate Chinese warfare from the 4th century AD to the early Tang dynasty when the military transitioned to light cavalry. A. von Le Coo's theory on the invention of the stirrup is that it was a contraption created by either mounted people who wanted to make riding less tiring, or those unused to riding to gain the necessary skills to match their adversaries.

The very earliest Chinese representation of a stirrup comes from a tomb figurine from South China dating to 302 AD, but this is a single stirrup that must have been used only for mounting the horse. The earliest figurine with two stirrups probably dates from about 322, and the first actual specimens of stirrups that can be dated precisely and with confidence are from a southern Manchurian burial of 415. However, stirrups have also been found in several other tombs in North China and Manchuria that are most likely of fourth century date. Most of these early Northeast Asian stirrups were oval in shape and made from iron, sometimes solid and sometimes applied over a wooden core, and this form would remain in use for many centuries thereafter.

— David Graff

The earliest stirrups in Japan were unearthed from 5th century tombs. They were flat bottomed rings of metal-covered wood. Cup-shaped stirrups (tsubo abumi) that enclosed the front half of the rider's foot replaced the earlier design. During the Nara period, the base of the stirrup which supported the rider's sole was elongated past the toe cup. This half-tongued style of stirrup (hanshita abumi) remained in use until the late Heian period when the fukuro abumi or musashi abumi replaced it. It had a base that extended the full length of the rider's foot and the right and left sides of the toe cup were removed. The open sides were designed to prevent the rider from catching a foot in the stirrup and being dragged. The military version (shitanaga abumi) of this stirrup was in use by the middle Heian period. It was thinner, had a deeper toe pocket, and a longer and flatter foot shelf. This stirrup stayed in use until European style-stirrup rings were reintroduced in the late 19th century. It is not known why the Japanese developed this unique style of stirrup. These had a distinctive swanlike shape, curved up and backward at the front so as to bring the loop for the leather strap over the instep and achieve a correct balance. Most of the surviving specimens from this period are made entirely of iron, inlaid with designs of silver or other materials, and covered with lacquer. In some examples there is an iron rod from the loop to the footplate near the heel to prevent the foot from slipping out. The footplates are occasionally perforated to let water drain out when crossing rivers, and these types are called suiba abumi. There are stirrups with holes in the front forming sockets for a lance or banner.

In the 6th century AD and later, earlier wooden and composite stirrups were replaced with cast iron versions in East Asia.

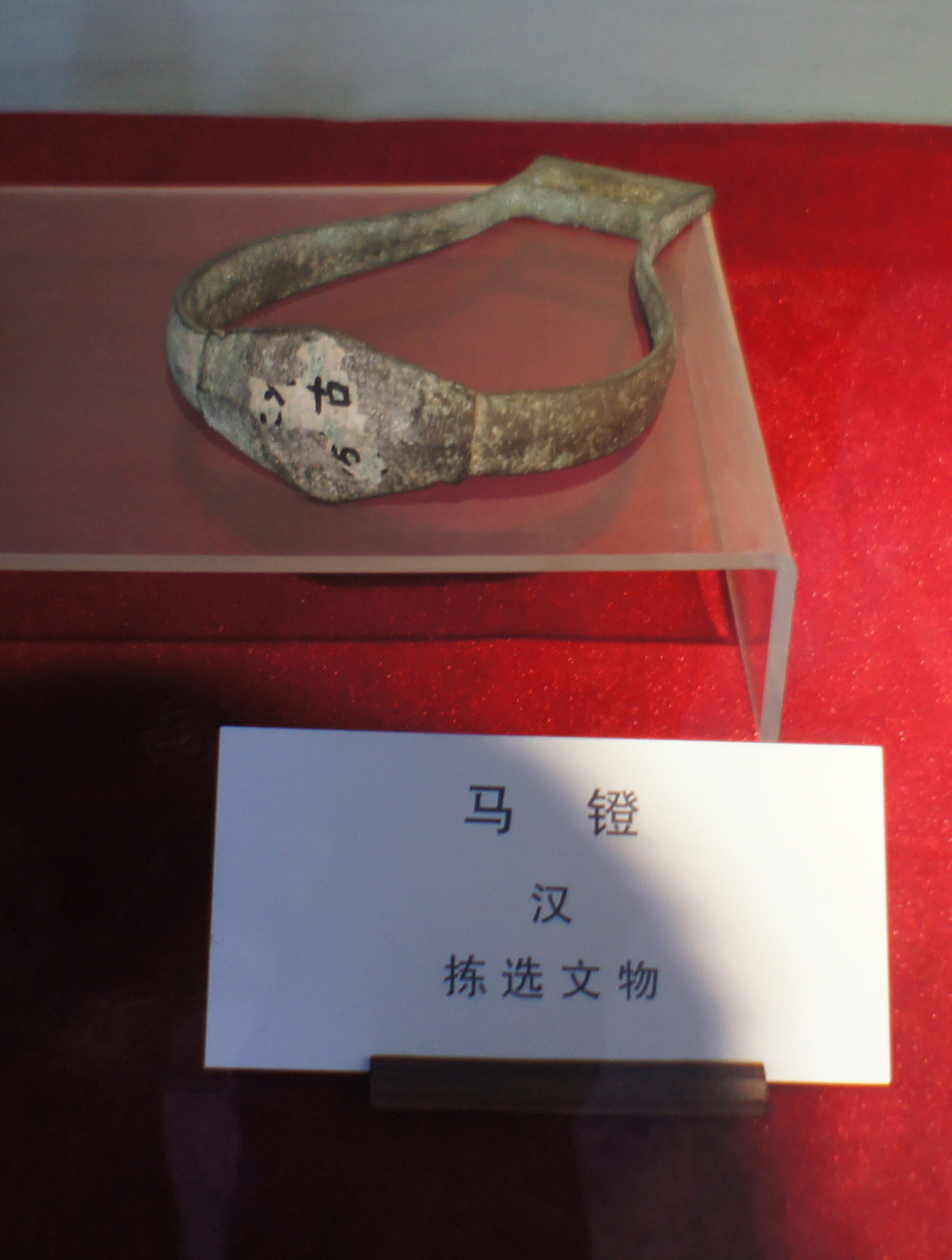
Han dynasty mounting stirrup

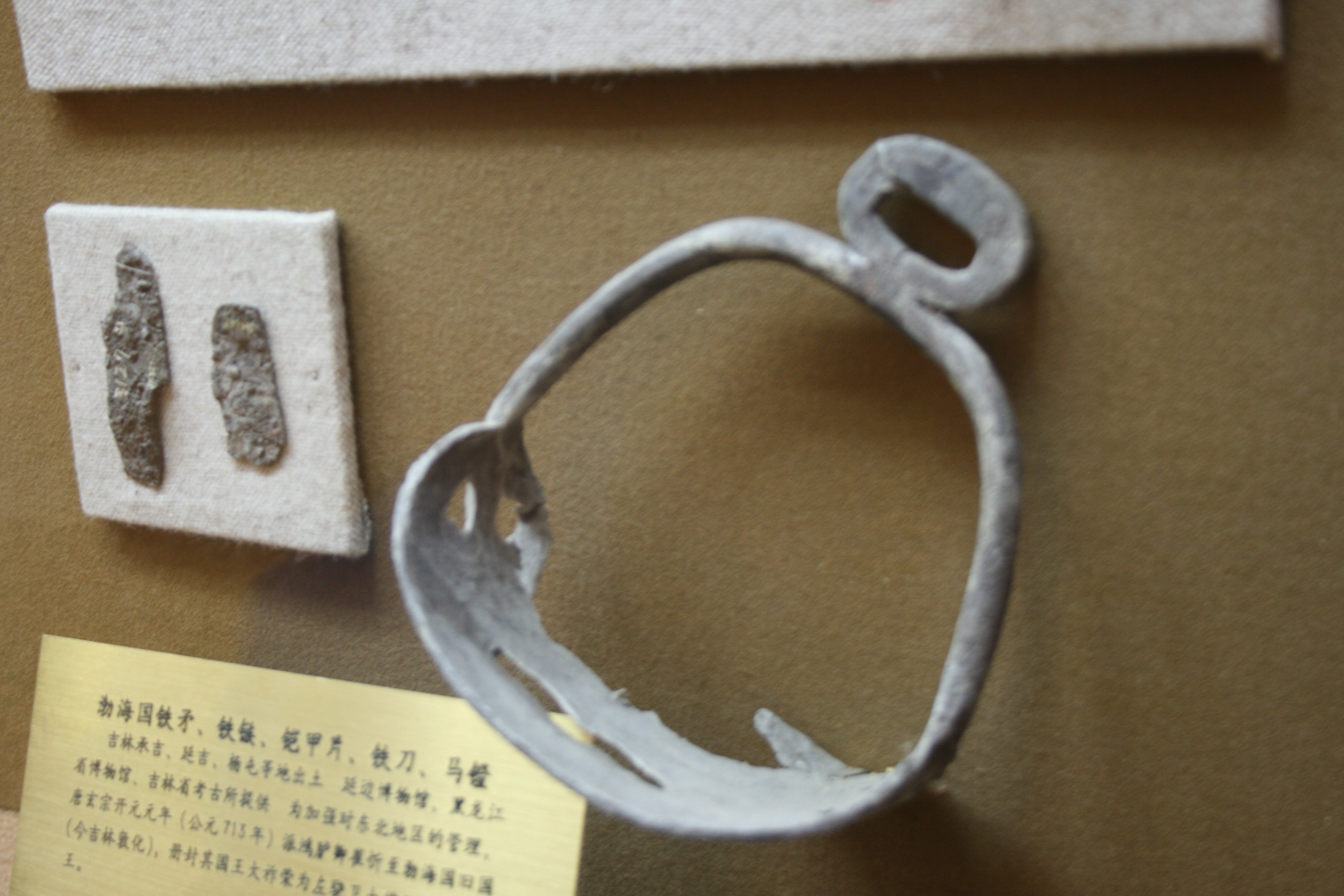
Han mounting stirrup

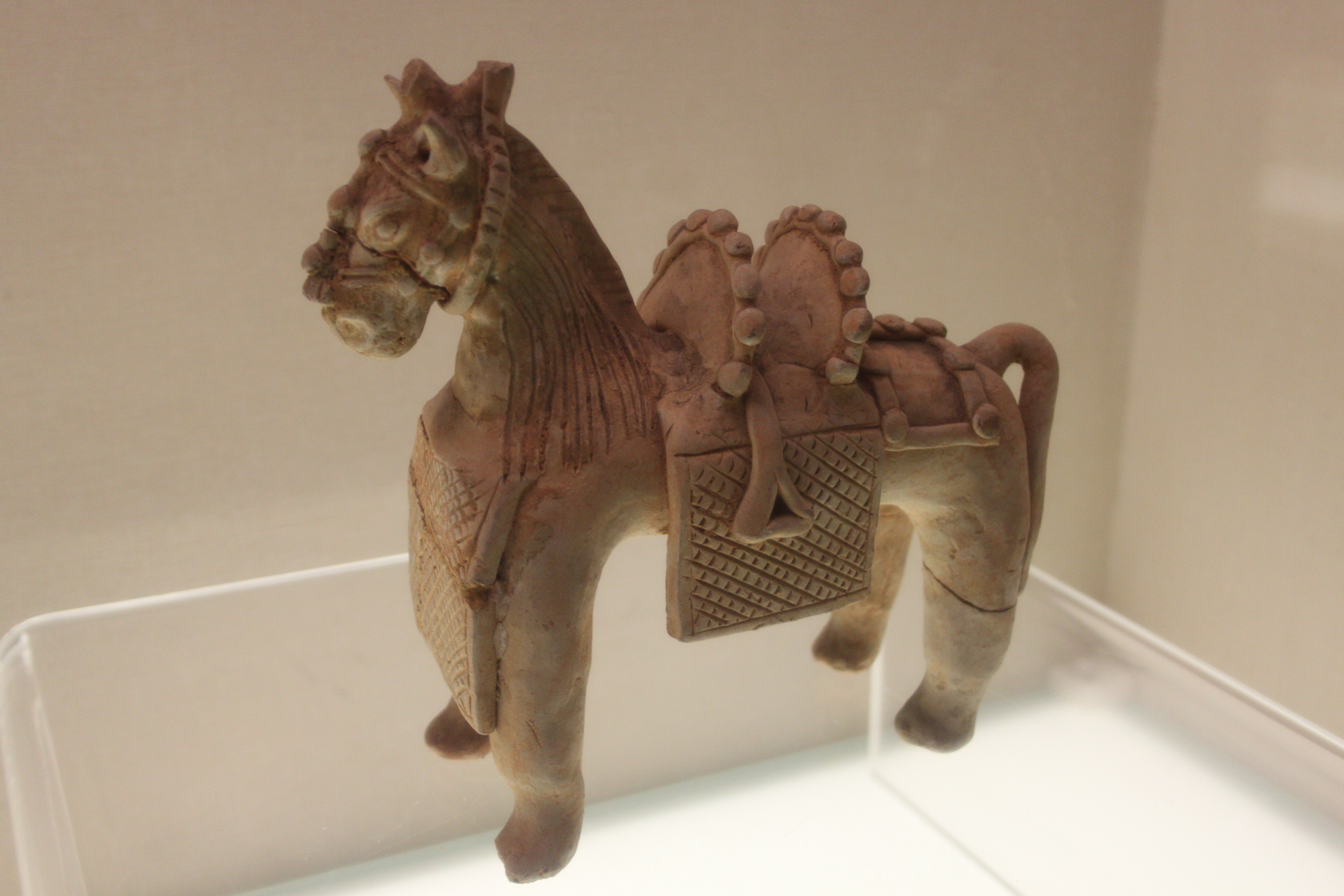
Horse figurine with stirrup, Western Jin

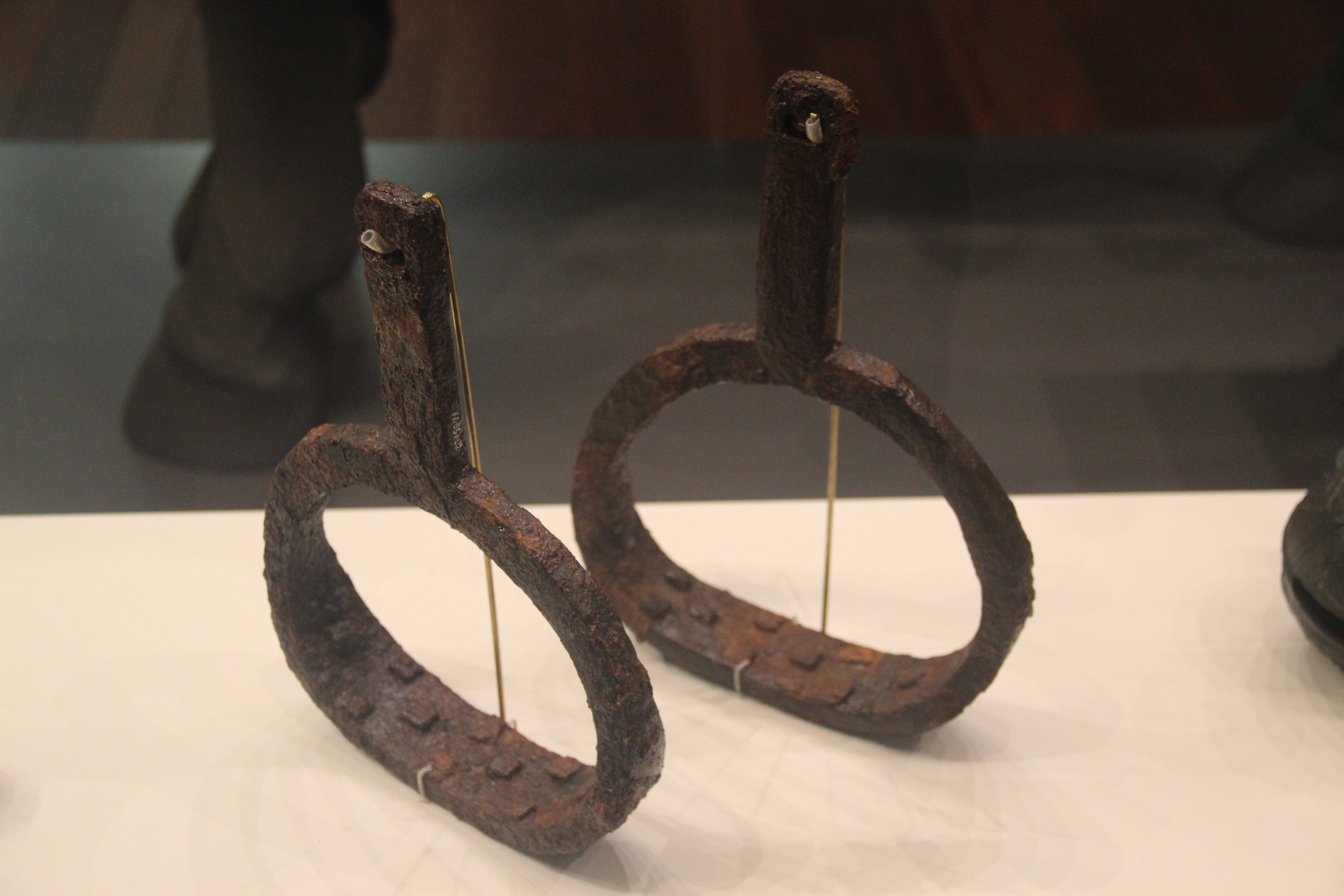
Iron stirrups, Gaya confederacy

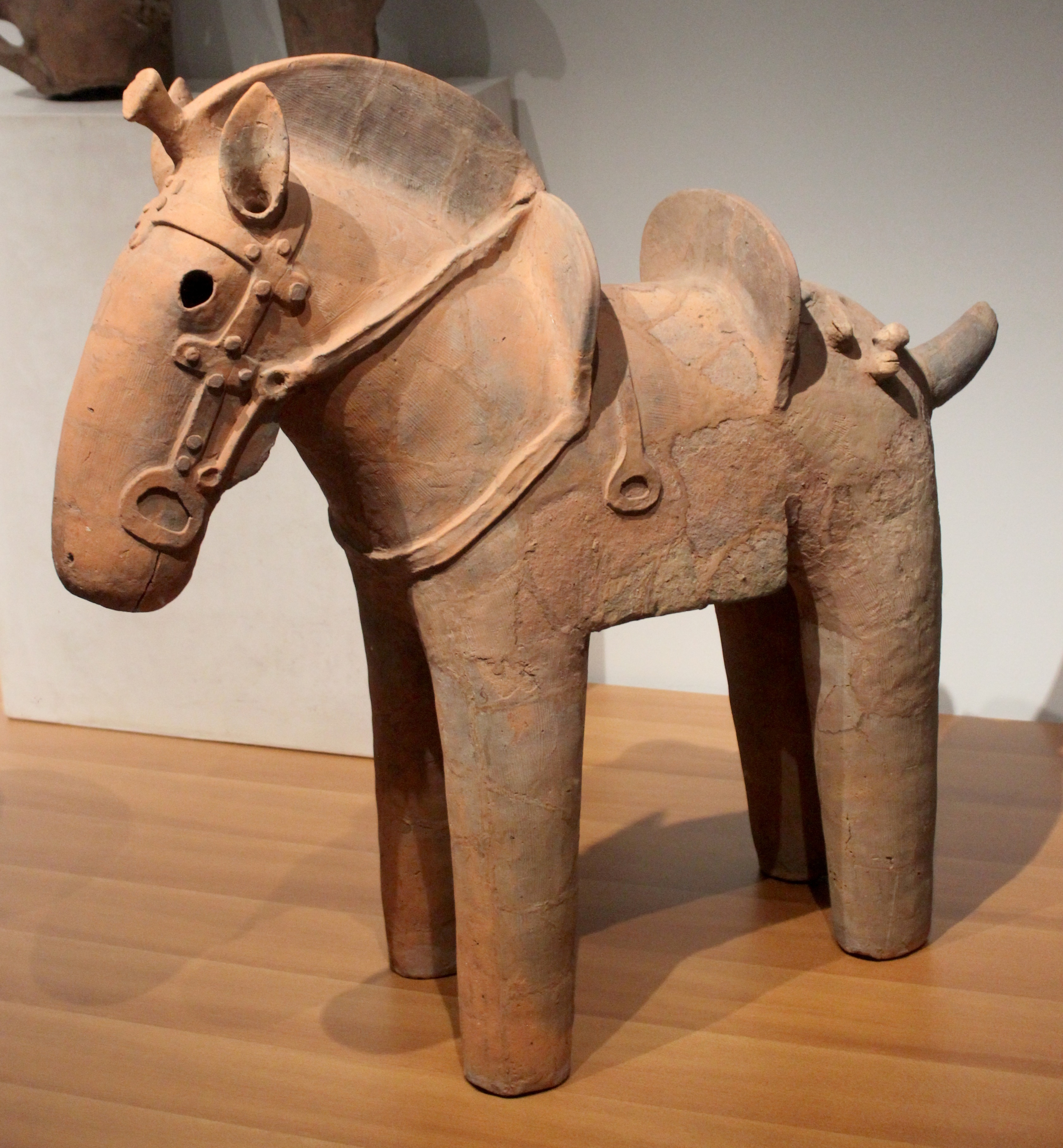
Haniwa horse statuette, complete with saddle and stirrups, 6th century, Kofun period, Japan

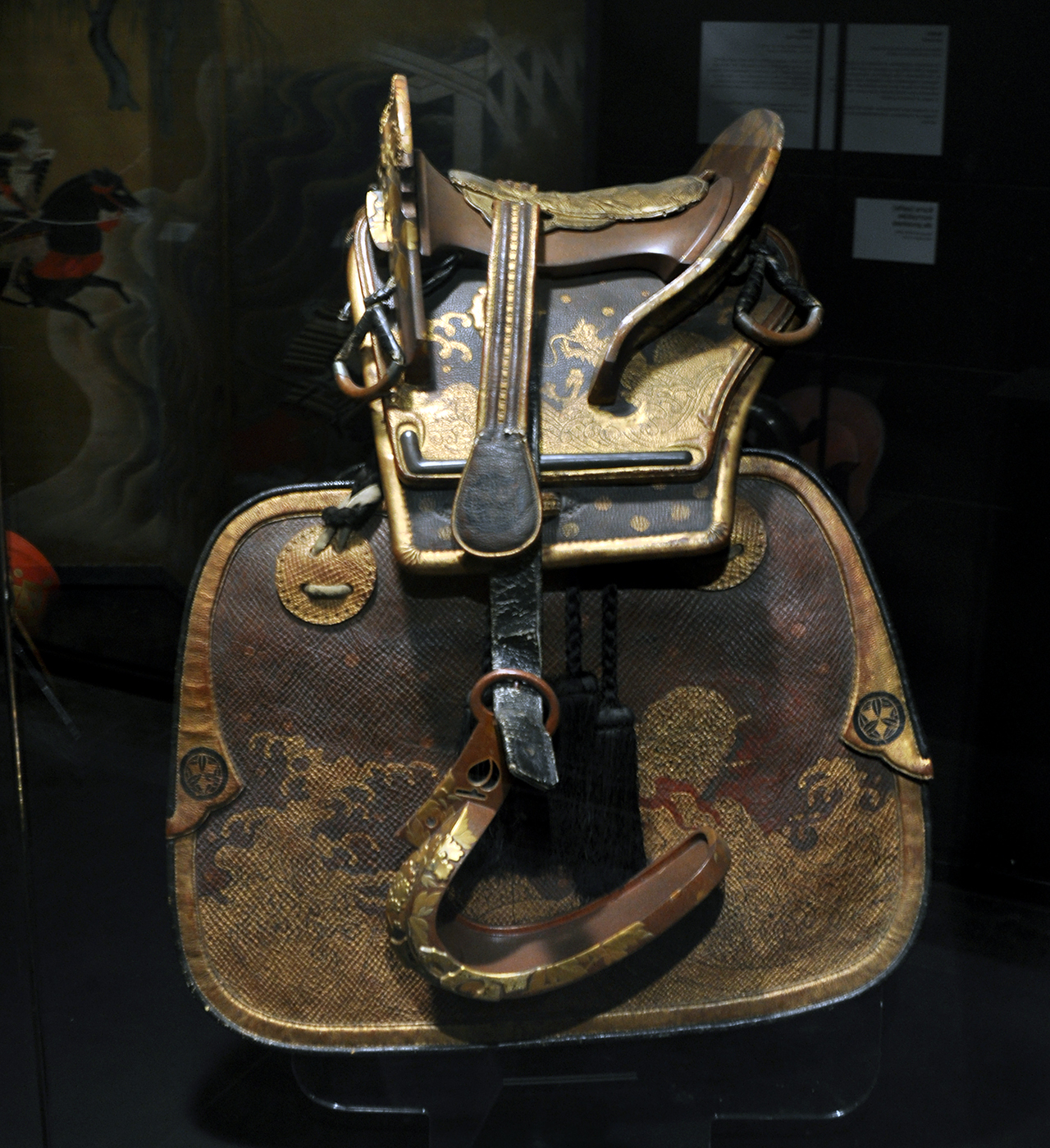
Samurai's equipment, c. 1670

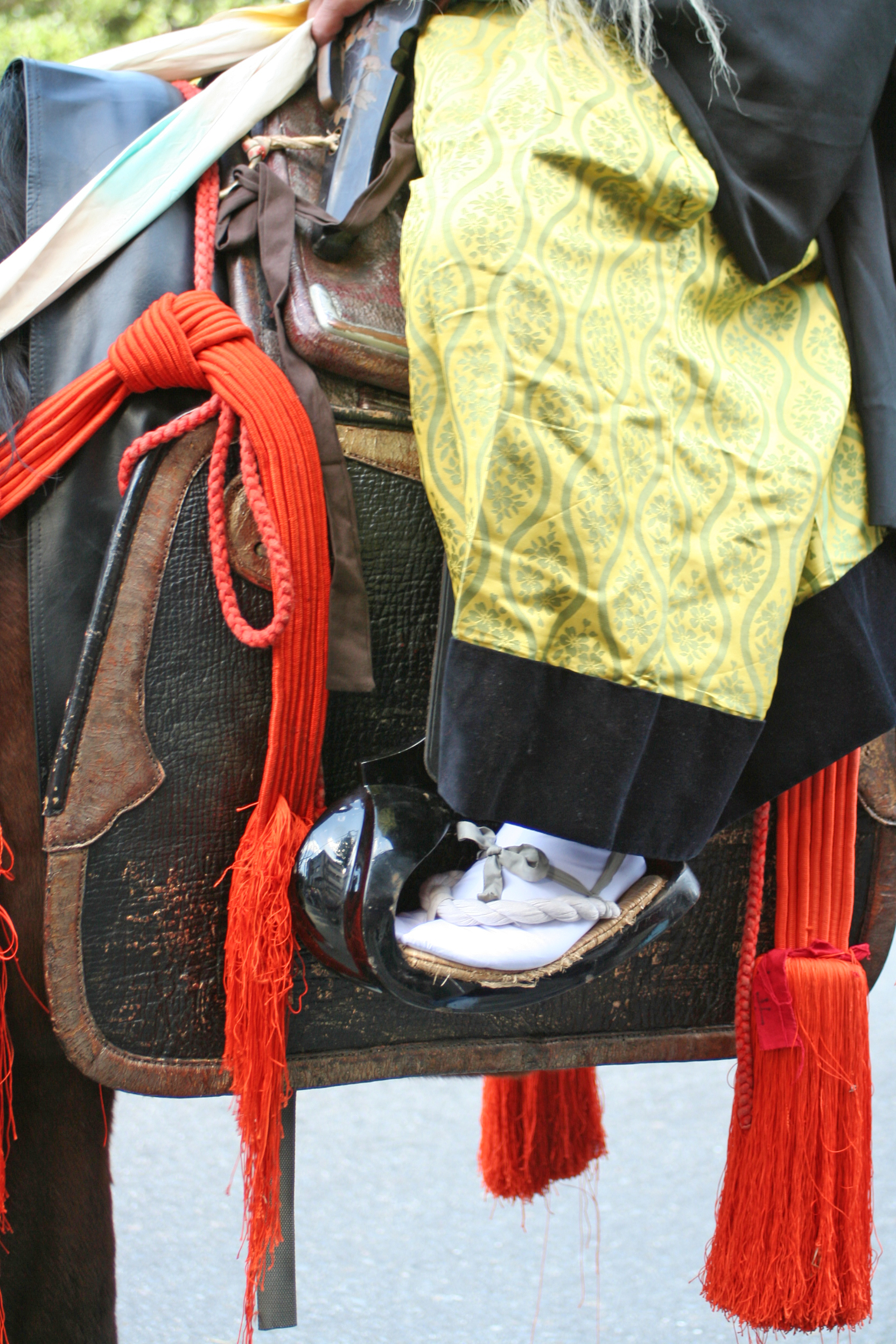
Traditional Japanese stirrups in use

=== West Asia ===
In east of Iran, local stirrups (ركاب rekāb) are circular with short straps, west of Iran influenced by Arab smithery sometimes produce triangle stirrups with long straps.

In the Ottoman Empire, the stirrup (ركاب rikâb or اوزنكی üzengi) became a metonym for the presence of sultan and/or his imperial entourage; rikâb often appended titles of people taken to replace higher ranking officials on leave for military campaigns.

=== Indian subcontinent ===
Khajuraho sculptures in the 10th century depicted horses with leather stirrups. A horse equipped with golden stirrups (pādādhāra) was described in a poem by Someshvara III of Western Chalukya dated 1130 AD.

The iron stirrup arrived with the Mughal Empire and had developed a similar symbolism of power for the Emperor as was in the Ottoman Empire –a meeting before the emperor's court is in "presence of the stirrup" (حاضری ركاب hazir-i rikab)– though partly from the Persian tradition of horse-rearing seen as a job worthy of and differentiating nobility from the commoner.

=== Europe ===
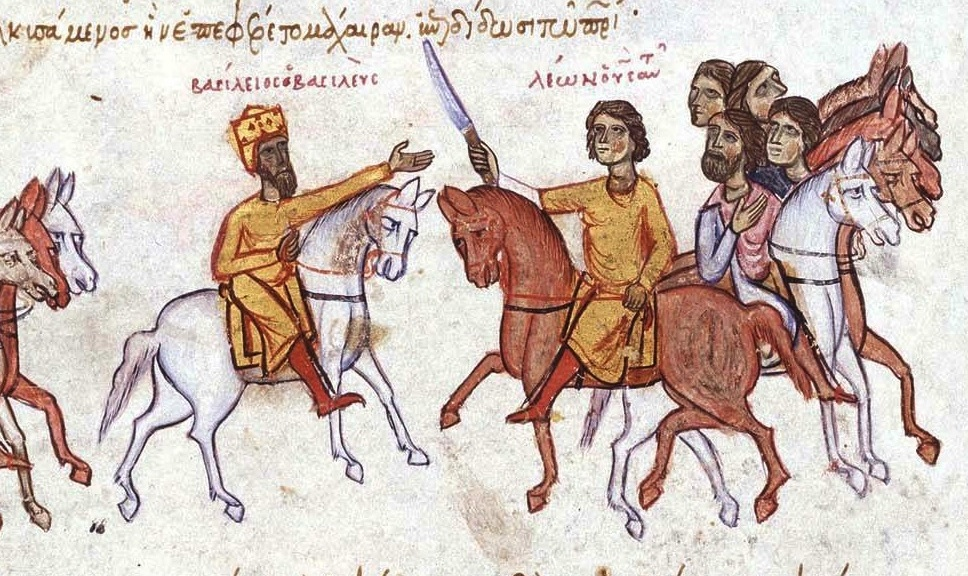
Roman emperor Basil I the Macedonian and his son Leo on horses with stirrups (from the Madrid Skylitzes, Biblioteca Nacional de España, Madrid)

By the late 6th or early 7th century AD, primarily due to invaders from Central Asia, such as the Avars, stirrups began spreading across Asia to Europe from China. The iron pear-shaped form of stirrups, the ancestor of medieval European types, has been found in Europe in 7th century Avar graves in Hungary. A total of 111 specimens of early Avar-age, apple shaped, cast-iron stirrups with elongated suspension loop and flat, slightly inward bent tread had been excavated from 55 burial sites in Hungary and surrounding regions by 2005. The first European literary reference to the stirrup may be in the Strategikon, traditionally ascribed to the Roman emperor Maurice, and therefore written sometime between 575 and 628, but this is widely disputed, and others place the work in the eighth or ninth century. Maurice's manual notes the appropriate equipping of imperial cavalry: "the saddles should have large and thick clothes; the bridles should be of good quality; attached to the saddles should be two iron steps [skala], a lasso with a thong". Dennis notes that the lack of specific Greek word for stirrup evidences their novelty to the Byzantines, who are supposed to have adopted these from their bitter enemy the Avars, and subsequently passed them on to their future enemies, the Arabs. An early 7th-century date is secured for most Hungarian finds of stirrups with elongated suspension loops, though some of these must even be dated to before 600. Literary and archaeological evidence taken together may indicate that the stirrup was in common military use in South-Central Europe and the Eastern Mediterranean by the latter half of the 6th century, with the Roman Empire having them in use by the year 600.

By the 8th century stirrups began to be adopted more widely by Europeans. The earliest stirrups of western Europe, those of Budenheim and Regensburg, were either brought from the Avar Khaganate as booty or gifts, or were local imitations of stirrups in use at that time among Avar warriors. However, the Avar-style stirrups were not as widely adopted in western Europe. Stirrups do not appear in the Merovingian and Italo-Lombard milieu in large numbers, nor as frequently as within the Carpathian Basin. Most other stirrups found in Germany that date to the 7th century do not resemble the iron Avar style commonly found in burial assemblages from Hungary and neighboring regions. Instead, hanging mounts occasionally found in burial assemblages in southern Germany suggest the use of wooden stirrups. The scarcity of early-medieval stirrup finds in western Europe was noted by Bernard Bachrach: "Out of 704 eighth century male burials excavated in Germany until [sic] 1967, only 13 had stirrups."

The earliest stirrups in the Baltic region are replicas of those in existence in Germany during the 7th century. In Northern Europe and Britain the metamorphosis of earlier wood, rope and leather forms of stirrups to metal forms can be seen in the archeological record, "suggesting that one or more of the early forms have parallel development with those in Hungary, rather than being derived solely from the latter region". "In Scandinavia two major types of stirrups are discerned, and from these, by the development and fusion of different elements, some almost certainly of central European origin, most other types were evolved." The first main type, Scandinavian type I, appears to owe little to Hungarian forms. The earliest variety of this type can be dated to the 8th century in Vendel grave III in Sweden. The second principal type in Northern Europe has, as its most characteristic feature, a pronounced rectangular suspension loop set in the same plane as the bow, as found amongst the Hungarian examples, and is predominantly centered in Denmark and England during the later 10th and 11th centuries. A variant of this type, called the north European stirrup, has been dated to the second half of the 10th century in Sweden, found at the boat-burial cemetery at Valsgärde.

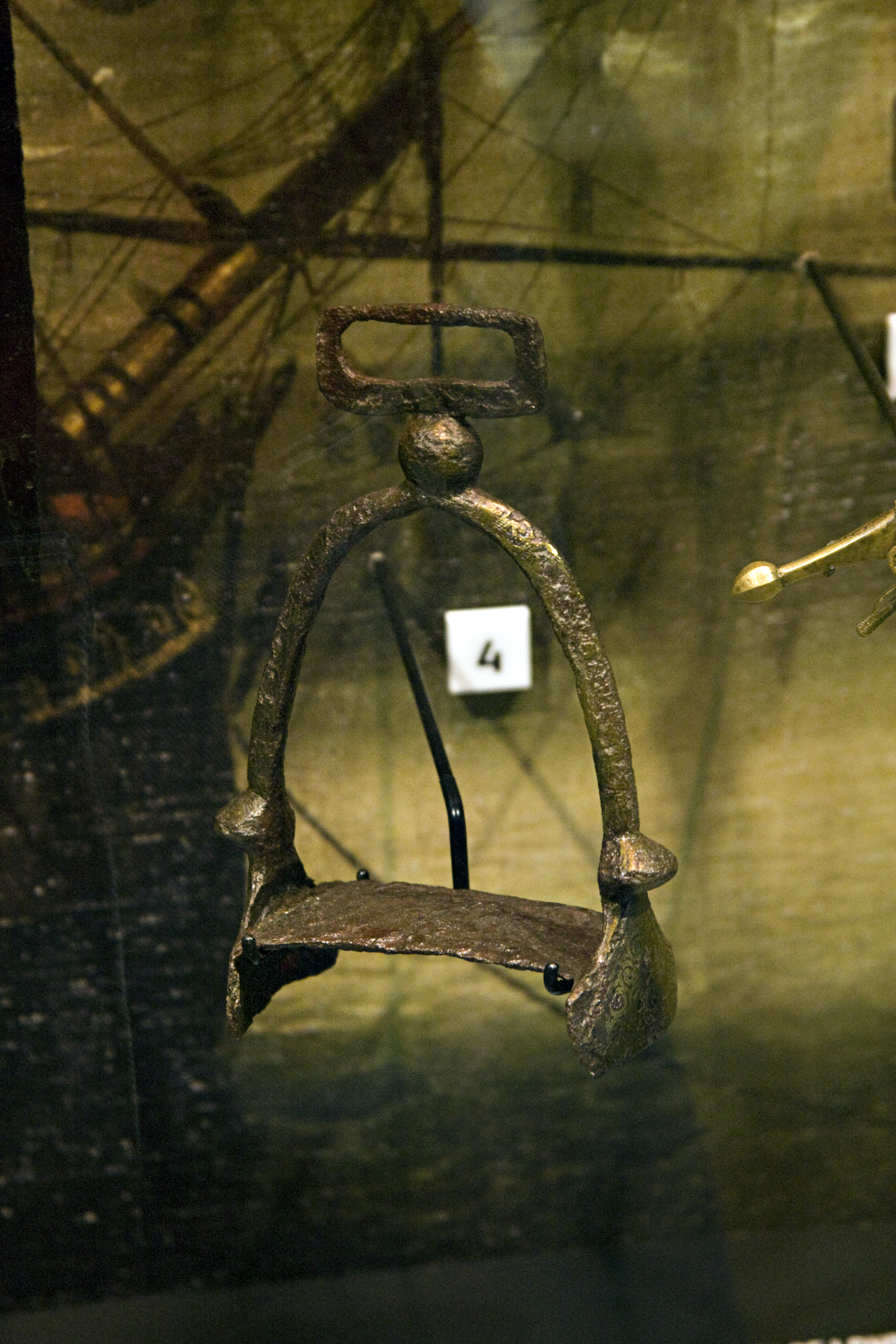
10th century stirrup found in England

In Denmark from the 920s to the 980s, during the reign of the Jelling kings, many leading Danes were buried with military honors and equipped with stirrups, bits and spurs, in what are called cavalry-graves, found mostly in north Jutland. Into England, it is argued, stirrups were not introduced by the Scandinavian settlers of the 9th century but are more likely related to later Viking raids led by Cnut the Great and others during the reign of King Aethelred (978–1013).

In what today is France, Charles Martel distributed seized lands to his retainers on condition that they serve him by fighting in the new manner, which some attribute to his recognizing the military potentialities of the stirrup. Later, Charlemagne ordered his poorer vassals to pool their resources and provide a mounted and armed knight, though the system proved unworkable, and instead the system of distributing land to vassals based on a knight's service was developed.

=== West Africa ===
Accounts of the Empire of Mali mention the use of stirrups and saddles in the cavalry. Stirrups resulted in the creation and innovation of new tactics, such as mass charges with thrusting spear and swords.

=== Great Stirrup Controversy ===
Some scholars credit the birth of feudalism and its subsequent spread into Northern Italy, Spain, Germany and into the Slavic territories to the stirrup: "Few inventions have been so simple as the stirrup, but few have had so catalytic an influence on history. The requirements of the new mode of warfare which it made possible found expression in a new form of western European society dominated by an aristocracy of warriors endowed with land so that they might fight in a new and highly specialized way."

Other scholars dispute this assertion, suggesting that stirrups may provide little advantage in shock warfare, but are useful primarily in allowing a rider to lean farther to the left and right on the saddle while fighting, and simply reduce the risk of falling off. Therefore, it is argued, they are not the reason for the switch from infantry to cavalry in medieval armies, nor the reason for the emergence of feudalism.

== Weaknesses in design ==
For the comfort of the horse, all stirrups require that the saddle itself be properly designed. The solid tree of the saddle distributes the weight of the rider over a greater surface area of the horse's back, reducing pressure on any one area. If a saddle is made without a solid tree, without careful engineering, the rider's weight in the stirrups and leathers can create pressure points on the horse's back and lead to soreness. This is especially noticeable with inexpensive bareback pads that add stirrups by means of a strap across the horse's back with a stirrup at each end.

== Modern stirrups ==
=== English-style stirrups ===
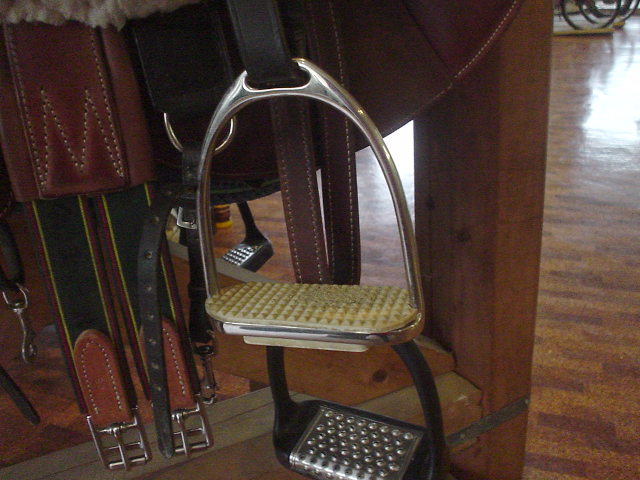
Modern fillis stirrups

Stirrups used on English saddles are usually made of metal. Though called "irons," they are no longer made of iron, as a rule, but instead stainless steel is the alloy of choice, due to its strength, though when weight is an issue, such as for a jockey, they may also be made of aluminum. Stirrups may also be made of synthetic materials and various metallic alloys. There are many variations on the standard stirrup design, most claiming either to be safer in the event of a fall or to make it easier for a rider to maintain a proper foot and leg position.

Some variations include:

- Standard iron: The most common stirrup iron, consisting of a tread, with two branches, and an eye at the top for the leather to run through. The main styles seen today include:
  - Fillis: A design with a heavy tread, and branches that rise to the eye in a rounded triangular shape.
  - Prussian: A rounder and lighter design.
- Safety stirrups. There are a number of designs intended to release the foot more easily in the event of a fall. One style has an outside branch that is curved, rather than straight. Other designs feature a breakaway outer branch which will detach with sufficient pressure, freeing the foot.
- Side-saddle stirrups: usually have a slightly larger eye to accommodate the thicker stirrup leather on a sidesaddle.
- Other designs: have joints or hinges in the branches of the stirrups to allow for them to flex. However, one model was recalled in 2007 due to a tendency for the hinges to break. A variation on the hinged stirrup is the Icelandic Stirrup, which has the eye fixed at a 90 degree rotation to allow for less stress on the tendons, and easier retrieval should a stirrup be lost. There are a number of other patented designs with various features that are usually intended to either increase comfort or to assist proper foot position.
