= Great race =

Great race or The Great Race may refer to:

- Great race, any one of the obsolete categorization human races
- The race between the Central Pacific and Union Pacific Railroads to complete the first transcontinental railroad in the United States

== Competition ==
- Great Race (classic rally), a vintage car club rally across the continental United States
- 1908 New York to Paris Race, an international automobile race that was the inspiration for the 1965 film
- The Great Race (Pimlico), 1877 two and a half-mile horse "match" race run by a trio of champions at the Pimlico Race Course
- The Great Race (rowing), a New Zealand rowing race
- Richard S. Caliguiri City of Pittsburgh Great Race, a 10k urban foot race
- Eppie's Great Race, a triathlon held in Sacramento, California
- The Great Race (relay), a three- or four-person relay race held each August in Auburn, New York
- Bathurst 1000, a motor race held in Bathurst, New South Wales, often nicknamed "The Great Race"

== Media, myth, fiction ==
- The Great Race, 1965 comedy film by Blake Edwards
- Thomas & Friends: The Great Race, a Thomas & Friends film
- The great race between the animals, an ancient folk story underpinning the Chinese Zodiac
- Great Race (Native American legend), a Native American legend explaining man's dominion over the buffalo.
- "The Great Race", an episode of the TV series Pocoyo
