= Hemmings Motor News =

Magazine

- Cover of 70th anniversary issue (January 2024)
- Categories: Classic Car Magazine
- Frequency: Monthly
- Total circulation: 211,510 (December 2012)
- Founder: Ernest Hemmings
- Founded: 1954; 72 years ago
- Company: American City Business Journals
- Country: United States
- Based in: Bennington, Vermont, U.S.
- Website: www.hemmings.com/aboutus/
- ISSN: 0049-1845

Hemmings Motor News is a monthly magazine catering to traders and collectors of antique, classic, and exotic sports cars. It is the largest and oldest publication of its type in the United States, with sales of 215,000 copies per month, and is best known for its large classified advertising sections. The magazine counts as subscribers and advertisers practically every notable seller and collector of classic cars, including Jay Leno and his Big Dog Garage, and most collector car clubs are included in its directory.

The magazine was started by Ernest Hemmings in Quincy, Illinois, in 1954, then purchased by Terry Ehrich, who moved the company, Hemmings Motor News Publishing, to Bennington, Vermont, in the late 1960s. Ehrich published the magazine until his death in 2002. Hemmings Motor News Publishing was then acquired by American City Business Journals (ACBJ). Hemmings Motor News currently has 100 employees at its Bennington, Vermont headquarters.

Starting in 1970, Hemmings Motor News Publishing added Special Interest Autos, a bimonthly periodical focused primarily on American collectible automobiles. From 2000 to 2003, they published the muscle car and hotrod magazine Hemmings Rods and Performance, relaunched in 2003, under new owner ACBJ, as Hemmings Muscle Machines, with muscle cars as its sole focus.

In 2004, shortly after the release of Hemmings Muscle Machines, ACBJ ended publication of Special Interest Autos and began to develop its successor, Hemmings Classic Car, launched in October of that year. That was followed in 2005 by the addition of a new magazine, Hemmings Sports & Exotic Car.

Hemmings Motor News also contains an approximately 80-page section of editorial content. Content includes coverage of collector-car shows and auctions, sports cars, touring cars, classic cars, pre-war cars and historic racing cars, as well as family-type automobiles.

ACBJ, under the Hemmings banner, also sells a large line of calendars, clothing, signs, and other items relating to automobile collecting and memorabilia, and formerly maintained a public display of 25 cars at their headquarters. The display has been permanently closed as of 2022.

Richard Lentinello, executive editor of the three Hemmings-related magazines, left ACBJ in 2020.

Hemmings has ceased publication of Hemmings Classic Car and Hemmings Muscle Machines as of March 2025, leaving Hemmings Motor News as the only publication in their lineup. Both publications have been dropped from the website as of November 2024.

== Hemmings Classic Car ==
Hemmings Classic Car, launched in October 2004, was a monthly magazine and successor of Special Interest Autos (1970–January 2004), covering the topic of American, European and Japanese-built collector cars, targeting enthusiasts, owners, collectors, dealers, restorers and parts manufacturers.

Hemmings Classic Car captured several distinct collector-car audiences in a single publication, with an emphasis on early post-war 1946–1960 automobiles. Other categories included the pre-1916 Brass era cars, pre-war cars, CCCA-recognized Classic cars, and cars from the 1960s through the early 1980s.

Hemmings Classic Car featured photography showcasing these automobiles, including in-construction photographs of the entire restoration process, showing readers what it takes to produce a concours-quality collectible. As of 2008, data showed it as the best-selling old-car magazine in the world.

Subscribers to Hemmings Classic Car were notified in a letter with their January 2025 issue that the February 2025 issue will be their last. Hemmings cited "significant inflation related to production costs," "changes in advertiser demand," "newsstand supply-chain struggles," and consumer tastes shifting to digital and social media as reasons for the cancellation. Content from Hemmings Classic Car will be consolidated into Hemmings Motor News. Hemmings Classic Car subscribers will receive Hemmings Motor News instead for the remainder of their subscription after February 2025.

== Hemmings Sports & Exotic Car ==
Hemmings Sports & Exotic Car, launched in 2005 by American City Business Journals, was an automobile enthusiast magazine with content consisting solely of collector cars built outside the United States. In March 2017, subscribers of Hemmings Sports & Exotic Car were notified that the May 2017 issue would be the last, citing "financial reasons" for the cancellation.

== Hemmings Muscle Machines ==
Hemmings Muscle Machines, an American City Business Journals 2005 refocused continuation of Hemmings Motor News Publishing's Hemmings Rods and Performance (2000–2005). It was a monthly periodical focused primarily on muscle cars from the postwar era to present. Content included original cars, restorations, modified cars and new-production muscle cars.

Subscribers to Hemmings Muscle Machines were notified in a letter with their January 2025 issue that the February 2025 issue will be their last. Hemmings cited "significant inflation related to production costs," "changes in advertiser demand," "newsstand supply-chain struggles," as well as consumer tastes shifting to digital and social media as reasons for the publication cessation. Content from Hemmings Muscle Machines will be consolidated into Hemmings Motor News. Hemmings Muscle Machines subscribers, if they choose not to cancel and receive a refund for remaining issues, will receive Hemmings Motor News instead for the remainder of their subscription after February 2025.

== Racing activities ==
In 1979, a team from Hemmings participated in the Cannonball Baker Sea-to-Shining-Sea Memorial Trophy Dash. In 1986, the same team of Terry Erich, former BMW factory motorcycle racer Justus Taylor and Hemmings editor-in-chief David Brownell entered the Great American Race, and Hemmings later became a primary sponsor of the race. In 2007, Hemmings ended their participation in what was now called the Great Race, and began participating in the Hemmings Vintage Car Rally. Hemmings' sponsorship of the Great Race resumed in 2011.
