= Ride and Tie =

Endurance racing sport

Ride and Tie is an endurance racing sport combining running and horse riding. Teams consist of two runners and one horse who complete a 20–100 mile trail course by "leapfrogging" one another.

One person starts the race on the horse, the other on foot. The horse travels faster than the runner; after a previously arranged time has passed, the person on the horse gets off, ties the horse to a tree and takes off running. The first runner comes up to the horse, unties it and trots or gallops down the trail. When the horsed partner reaches the runner, the person on the horse can either get off and exchange with the other partner (a "flying tie") or can ride on and tie the horse to a tree. Partners do this for the entire distance. Each team learns to maximize the different members' strengths and weaknesses to their advantage.

== History ==
Ride and Tie was founded in 1971 by Bud Johns, who was a public relations director for Levi Strauss & Co. Levi's was looking to sponsor a difficult sporting event that would emphasize the company's rough-and-ready image and Johns suggested they invent a sport of running and riding based on historical records. However, ride and tie was historically used as an effective means of travel for two people and one horse. For instance, Henry Fielding mentions the use of ride and tie in his novel Joseph Andrews. Descriptions of riding and tying can also be found in The Life of Samuel Johnson, LL.D., Blue Highways, and in A Narrative of the Life of David Crockett, "...and I was started homeward again, in company with a brother of the first owner of the drove, with one horse between us; having left my brother to come on with the balance of the company. I traveled on with my new comrade about three days' journey; but much to his discredit, as I then thought, and still think, he took care all the time to ride, but never to tie; at last I told him to go ahead, and I would come when I got ready." (Chapter 2). Furthermore, the small town of Noti, Oregon got its name when a Native American discovered that the cowboy he had been ride and tying with had not tied the horse in the town, as they had previously agreed upon. A ride and tie-type race is also depicted in "The Wager" episode of The Waltons.

== Race Structure ==
A ride and tie team is formed with three members: two human and one equine (the equine may be a horse, pony, donkey, or mule at least 5 years in age). One partner (A) starts the race on the horse, while the other (B) starts on foot. As the horse will travel faster than the teammate on foot, partner A will get off the horse after a previously agreed upon distance or time and will tie the horse to a tree or other suitable object and start running. Partner B gets on the horse, and trots or canters until he reaches partner A. At this point, partner B can dismount and hand the horse directly over to partner A (a “flying tie”), or he can ride on some distance and tie the horse further up the trail. On particularly challenging sections of trail, the partner with the horse may dismount and lead the horse. In this manner, the human partners alternate running and riding until the finish line. According to the official rules, partners must change possession of the horse at least 6 times, but there is no upper limit on the number of exchanges that can be made. At least two exchanges must take place between each vet check and partners must exchange at each vet check. A team is finished when all three members have crossed the finish line, but the team does not have to cross together.

Horses are presented to a vet before the start of the race to make sure they are fit for the event. There is generally at least one vet check during the race, and the horse must be presented for a vet examination again within an hour of finishing the race. Pulse, respiration, hydration levels, gut noises, and soundness will all be examined at vet checks. Vet checks also provide time for the horse to eat and drink.

== Horse Selection ==
Arabians excel at Ride and Tie, though many other breeds have been successful as well. The most important aspects of a ride and tie horse is that they be conformationally sound and well-conditioned. It is also important that they not be too herd-bound, as these horses sometimes have difficulties getting used to be left tied to trees and having other horses run by them. A team that is interested in being competitive at the highest level, or is merely composed of two fast runners, will need to have a very fit horse that can trot briskly or canter the entire race distance (though with brief breaks at ties, of course). If the horse is not fast enough, it might not be able to catch the partner running ahead.

== World Championship (formerly Levi's Ride and Tie Championship) Race ==
The World Championship race has been held annually since 1971. The championship race does not reside at a fixed location. While the location usually changes every year, multiple World Championship races have been held at the same race site (for instance, Cuneo Creek Horse Camp, located in the Humboldt Redwoods State Park hosted the 2007 and 2009 championship and is scheduled to host the 2011 championship as well). There are no qualifying standards for the World Championships, other than the normal condition that the horse must pass a pre-ride vet check. Any country can field multiple teams, and the first team to register from each country outside the United States gets the entry fee waived.
Three classes of competitors are recognized at Ride and Ties: Man/Man, Man/Woman, and Woman/Woman. While Man/Man teams dominated the races throughout the 70s and 80s, Man/Woman teams have become increasingly competitive for the overall title since the mid-90s. The first Woman/Woman team to win the overall title was a team of sisters, Susanne Rowland and Michelle Andreotti, in 2009. The youngest competitor to be part of a winning championship team was Sara Howard, who won her first championship at the age of 15 when she teamed with her father, Jim Howard in 2008. The youngest competitor to finish a long-course championship race (the championship race now often includes a short course of around 20 miles or less), was 9 year old Madison Trocha, who also partnered with her father, Bob Trocha in 2007 to cover the 34 mile course at the Humboldt Redwoods State Park.

=== World Championship Winners ===
Year	Location	Distance (miles)	Rider Names	Horse Name	Best-Conditioned Horse
2000	Big Creek, CA	32	Tom Johnson, Skip Lightfoot (M/M)	Rajiek	Don
2001	Euer Valley, CA	35	Chris Turney, William Emerson (M/M)	Budweiser	Magic Sirocco
2002	Euer Valley, CA	31	Con Wadsworth, Tod Wadsworth (M/M)	Baurakal Khan	Fire
2003	Euer Valley, CA	31	Jim Howard, Dennis Rinde (M/M)	Magic Sirocco	Magic Sirocco
2004	Fort Bragg, CA	34	Jim Howard, Dennis Rinde (M/M)	Magic Sirocco	Yaquar Adonai
2005	Libby, MT	33	Jim Howard, Mark Richtman (M/M)	Magic Sirocco	Magic Sirocco
2006	Santa Ysabel, CA	30	Tom Gey, Jim Howard (M/M)	Magic Sirocco	Basia
2007	Humboldt Redwoods State Park, CA	34	Tom Johnson, Rufus Schneider (M/W)	Koona	Lakota Mare
2008	Taylorsville, CA	34	Sara Howard, Jim Howard (M/W)	Magic Sirocco	Magic Sirocco
2009	Humboldt Redwoods State Park, CA	34	Susanne Rowland, Michelle Andreotti (W/W)	Over Amile	Over Amile
2010	Mt. Adams, WA	35	Sara Howard, Jim Howard (M/W)	Magic Sirocco	Freedom
2011	Humboldt Redwoods State Park, CA	35	Sara Howard, Jim Howard (M/W)	Magic Sirocco	Ron G
2012	Bandit Springs, OR	33	Ben Volk, Dennis Summers (M/M)	OMR Tsunami	Magic Sirocco

== Equipment ==
Most tack used in ride and ties is similar to that used in endurance riding, with light-weight saddles and synthetic bridles and breastplates being popular. Additionally, all horses in ride and tie need to be ridden with a halter or halter-bridle combination to which a tie rope can be attached. The tie rope is approx. 8 ft. (2.4 m) long and is often made of a light-weight climbing rope with a carabiner on one end to make tying and untying easier. The carabiner must be a proper climbing carabiner so it can hold against the force of a horse pulling on it. Ride and tiers also usually ride with sheepskin covers over their saddles to prevent chafing, as competitors generally ride in running clothes (i.e., shorts and T-shirts). Almost all ride and tiers have water bottle holders on their saddles and some wear hydration systems on their own bodies in case they get separated from the horse for longer than intended.

== Notable Ride and Tie Competitors ==
Gordy Ainsleigh is one of the most well-known ride and tiers, as he also inspired the creation of the Western States Endurance Run. Ken “Cowman” Shirk is another well-known ride and tier. Jim Howard has won many Ride and Tie World Championships, as well as two Western States 100 mile runs (1981 and 1983). Mary Tiscornia is the only person to have raced in every Ride and Tie World Championship and she has many titles to her name as well. Warren Hellman won the national championship (in his age category) five times.

== See also ==
- Endurance riding
- Ultramarathon
- Trail running
