= Great American Race =

Great American Race may refer to:

- Indianapolis 500, an open-wheel race
- Daytona 500, a stock car race
- Great Race (classic rally), an annual club rally for antique vehicles
