= Tevis Cup =

American equestrian endurance ride

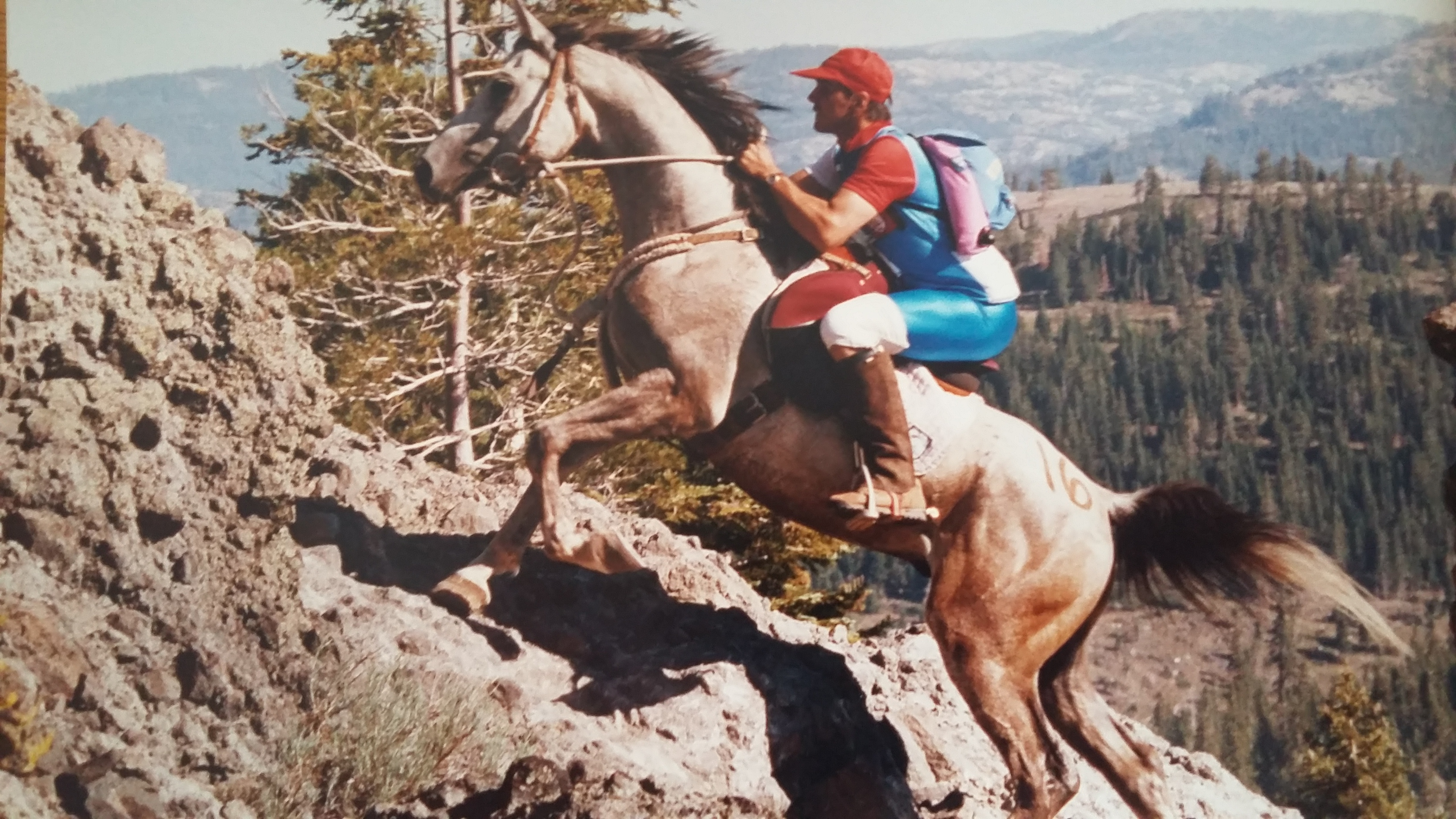
The iconic Cougar Rock portion of the trail; 1991 Tevis Cup

The Western States Trail Ride, popularly called the Tevis Cup, is a 100-mile endurance ride. The amateur event has been held annually since 1955 except in 2008 when it was cancelled due to forest fires and in 2020 when it was cancelled due to the COVID-19 pandemic. The ride is sanctioned by the American Endurance Ride Conference (AERC) which has recognized Tevis as a foundational ride in modern American endurance riding. The ride is sponsored by the Western States Trail Foundation (WSTF).

== Background ==
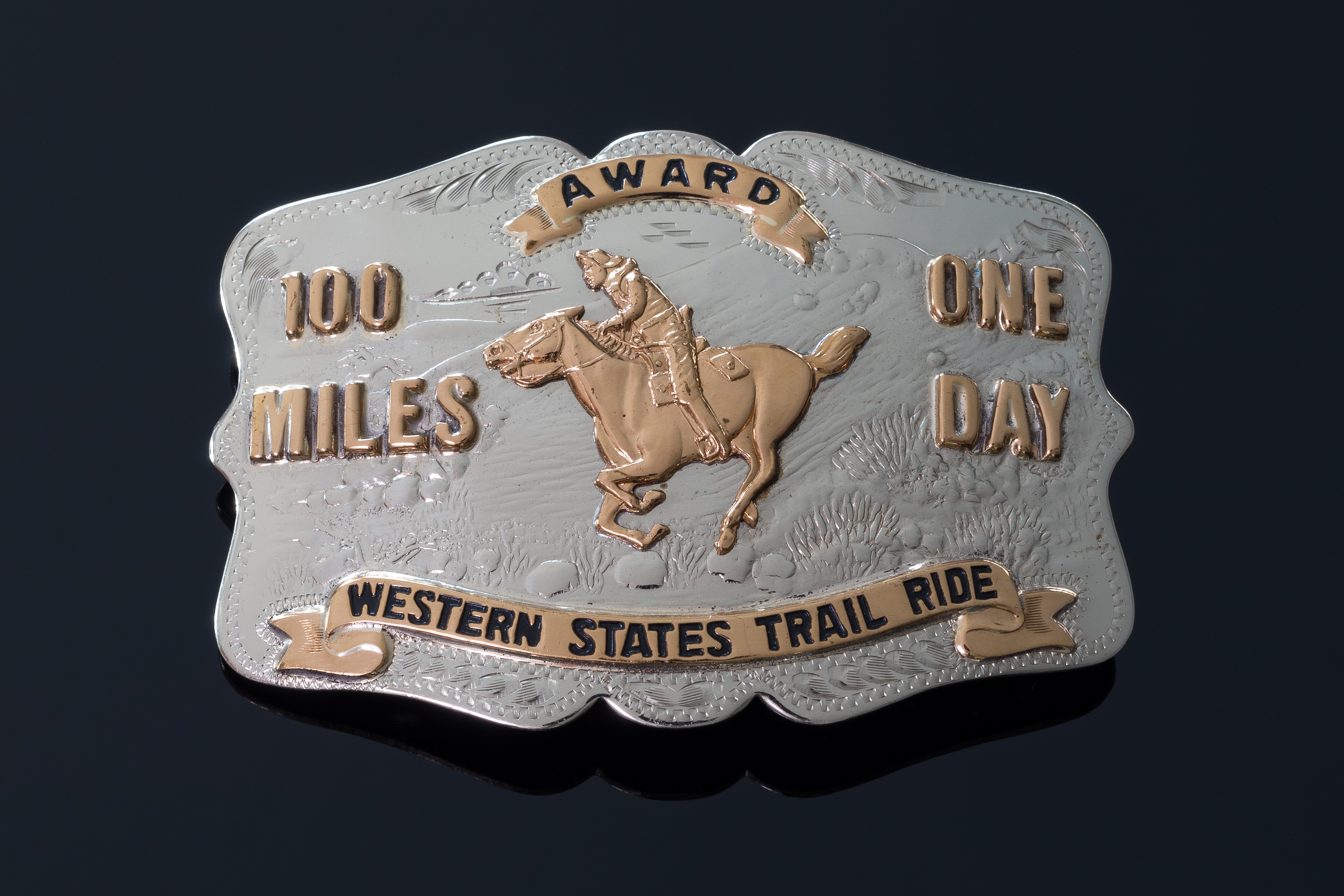
Tevis buckle awarded to Carol Eiselt (née Walton), Chico, for her successful completion of the 100-mile endurance ride in 1986

The ride is held in El Dorado and Placer County, California, starting at 5:15 a.m. at Robie Equestrian Park (39°14′20″N 120°10′39″W) near the town of Truckee, across the crest of the Sierra Nevada near the Squaw Valley Ski Resort, traverses through El Dorado County and ends at 5:15 a.m. near the fairgrounds in Placer County in Auburn. There are mandatory holds for rest and veterinarian evaluation, typically one at Robinson Flat (~30 milepost) and the other at Foresthill (~70 milepost). There are many other points along the trail where veterinarians evaluate the condition of the horse including the finish. Each rider who completes the 100-mile course within the 24-hour limit and whose mount is judged "fit to continue" can elect to receive a silver Completion Award Buckle. The date of the ride is generally selected on a weekend in July or early August to best take advantage of the light from a full moon.

Some historical ride statistics as of the 62nd ride on August 5, 2017: There have been 10,365 starters and 5,615 finishers, with an overall completion rate of about 54%. Winning riders were divided between 32 men and 33 women (counting three years when there were ties). Of the winning horses through 2017, 72% have been geldings, 22% mares, and 6% stallions. The average age of the equine to complete the ride first is 10 years old. The oldest finisher was PL Murcury, a 27-year old Arabian gelding (2018). The youngest to complete was Capella at 3 before an age limit was established.

== History ==
Because he wanted to demonstrate that it was possible to ride the craggy trail from Lake Tahoe to Auburn in a day, high country rider Wendell Robie of Auburn, California, developed this trail. In 1964 Paige Harper's horse Keno was the first recipient of the James Ben Ali Haggin Cup, commonly called the Haggin Cup. The first ten riders to finish successfully may present their horse before the Veterinary Committee and the WSTF Cup Committee on Sunday morning. One horse is selected as finishing in the most superior condition. In AERC, weight and ride time contribute to the equivalent called Best Condition. It is believed that the practice of selecting a Best Condition horse began when commanding Officers in the U.S. Cavalry would select a superior mount from their regiment to ride the day after arriving at their destination. In 1989 the WSTF Veterinary Committee with the support of the WSTF Cup Committee did not award the Haggin Cup. 51 years after its inception, the Haggin Cup has been awarded 49 times: 39 geldings (80%), 8 mares (16%) and 2 stallions (4%) through 2014 when Barrak Blakeley's 17-year-old Arabian gelding MCM Last Dance won the award (the youngest rider and oldest horse to win the Haggin Cup).

The Josephine Stedem Scripps Foundation Trophy is also presented on behalf of the ride in honor of all juniors that complete the challenge. It was first presented in 1994 by Roxanne Greene, who donated the Cup, and her daughter Rebecca Greene, the youngest rider ever to win ten Tevis buckles. Some riders were not recorded as junior participants in the early years and still need to be identified as such. Wendell Robie who founded the ride, set the rule that riders must be at least twelve years of age to enter and would be considered a junior rider until the age of eighteen.

The 54th Tevis Cup was originally scheduled for Saturday, July 19, 2008. However, on July 9 that year the Western States Trail Foundation and the US Forest Service held a meeting and agreed that the ride should be cancelled due to the American River Complex wildfires (part of the Summer 2008 California wildfires) that began burning in the area around June 21, 2008. Therefore, the 54th Tevis Cup occurred on Saturday, August 1, 2009. A total of 169 riders started from Robie Equestrian Park. There were six "junior" riders to start and four that finished. A total of 82 horses were "pulled" at various vet-checks along the Western States Trail by the team of expert equestrian veterinarians. The weather was much cooler than average, so this was favorable for the horses and riders alike. A website blog by Karen Chaton kept everyone informed of the progress throughout the 100-miles. For the first time in Tevis history, videos taken from the saddle were uploaded onto YouTube and timely updates were shared using Twitter. The first rider to finish and winner of the 2009 Tevis Cup was Sarah Engsberg from Georgia riding K-Zar Emmanuel, a 15-year-old gray Arabian gelding. They crossed the finish line in Auburn at 10:20 p.m. Eleven minutes later the second horse was, LD Monique ridden by Melissa Ribley, DVM. The third horse arrived at 10:32 p.m.; AM Sands of Time, with Marcia Smith, DVM guiding her. The ride ended at 5:15 a.m. on August 2, and 87 riders (~51%) successfully completed. On Sunday morning, August 2, the "Top-Ten" horses to finish were presented for the Haggin Cup. The 2009 Haggin Cup for "best condition" was awarded to LD Monique and Melissa Ribley.

In 2011 heavy snow in the Sierra Nevada Mountains throughout the preceding winter were failing to melt from the upper portions of the trail. This forced officials to reschedule the ride to the next permissible date which was October 8. Two days before the ride a sudden snow storm again hit hard in the mountains rendering the starting location inaccessible and causing officials to revise the course. 177 entrants started the ride; 10 of them coming from outside of the United States. The 56th annual ride began in Auburn, traversed up to Foresthill and branched out to a turn-around point at the end of Gorman Ranch Road then back to Foresthill and finished in Auburn. The completion rate was nearly 70%. 2004 and 2007 winner, Jeremy Reynolds riding Riverwatch, was credited with the fastest time for this course earning his third Tevis Cup. He also repeated a win of the Haggin Cup which he previously captured in 2004 riding CV Eli when he tied for first place with Becky Spencer atop Oritos Sonny.

The 2014 ride was held on August 9, 2014, won by Heather Reynolds, riding a 14-year-old Arabian gelding, earning her second Tevis Cup victory. The Haggin Cup was awarded to MCM Last Dance, a 17-year-old Arabian gelding, ridden by a Junior rider Barrak Blakeley from Terrebonne, Oregon. Barbara White earned her 33rd Tevis buckle, and she remains the all-time leader for successful completions of the 100-mile ride. Hal Hall closely follows behind having earned his 30th Tevis buckle in 2013. Danny Grant of New Westminster, Canada received his One-Thousand Mile buckle while Patricia Chappell earned her Two-Thousand Mile buckle for 20 completions. There were 186 starters and 107 finishing for a 57.5% completion rate partially attributed to favorable weather conditions. 10 of 16 riders from 12 countries outside of the U.S. completed. Additionally, 4 of 7 Juniors finished the ride.

In 2017 long standing snow from the preceding winter forced organizers to utilize Soda Springs as an alternate starting point and rerouted the trail in the beginning stages. The ride was won by Tennessee Lane aboard the oldest winner to date at age 17, Auli Farwa aka Far, who had completed the ride 7 times prior and at the end of 2017 successfully completed every ride he started. The Haggin Cup was awarded to Treasured Moments, a 7 year old Arabian mare, which gave her rider Jeremy Reynolds a unique record third Haggin Cup riding different horses each time. Two other riders have won the Haggin Cup 3 times on two different horses: Hal V. Hall and Juliette Suhr. Out of the 172 starter, 92 finished resulting in a typical 54% completion rate.

In 2018 the ride took place on July 28. The conditions were unusually hot and humid with temperatures approaching 100 °F. Heather Reynolds, of Dunnellon, Florida, riding Cayucos won the ride. This was her third Tevis Cup victory.

In 2020, the ride was canceled due to the COVID-19 pandemic.

== See also ==
- Endurance riding
- Arabian horse
- Western States Endurance Run
