= Endurance riding =

Equestrian sport

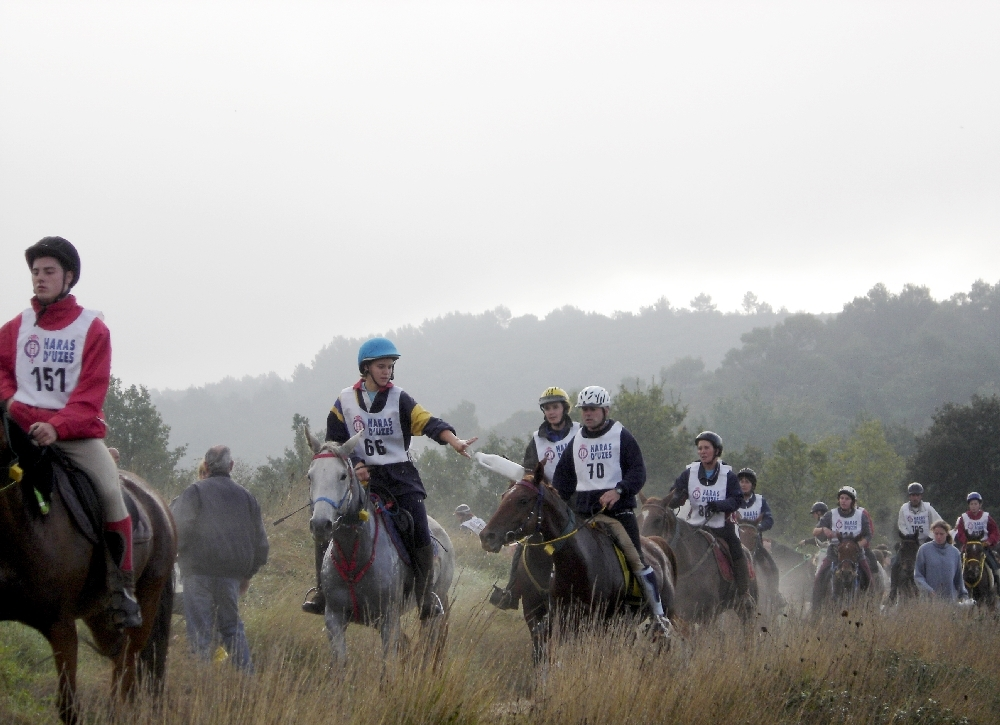
- Competitors on an endurance ride
- Highest governing body: International Federation for Equestrian Sports (FEI)

Characteristics
- Contact: No
- Team members: Individual and team at international levels
- Mixed-sex: Yes
- Type: Outdoor
- Equipment: Horse, appropriate horse tack
- Venue: Outdoor natural setting, usually varied and often rugged terrain

Presence
- Country or region: Worldwide

Endurance riding is an equestrian sport based on controlled long-distance races. It is one of the international competitions recognized by the FEI. There are endurance rides worldwide. Endurance rides can be any distance, though they are rarely over 160 km for a one-day competition.

There are two main types of long-distance riding, competitive trail riding and endurance rides. In an endurance ride, discussed in this article, the winning horse is the first one to cross the finish line while stopping periodically to pass a veterinary check that deems the animal in good health and fit to continue. As with human marathon running, many riders will participate to improve their horse's personal best performance and consider finishing the distance with a proper vet completion record to be a "win".

In the United States, most endurance rides are either 50 or 100 mi (80 or 161 km) long. Shorter rides, called Limited Distance rides (LD), are organized for new riders to the sport or young horses being trained. However, LD's have evolved into a competition of their own, in which more experienced riders and horses also participate. There are also longer, usually multi-day, rides as well. In the US, the American Endurance Ride Conference (AERC) sanctions endurance rides. There is a second organization in the U.S., mainly based in the PNW called the Equine Distance Riding Association (EDRA). They sanction endurance rides as well, but not alongside AERC. In the UK, Endurance GB is the governing body. Winning riders can complete 100-mile (160 km) rides in 14 to 15 hours.

Any breed can compete, but the Arabian generally dominates the top levels because of the breed's stamina and natural endurance abilities.

== History ==
Though the need to ride long distances has existed since the domestication of the horse, endurance riding as an organized activity was first developed in the United States based on European cavalry (particularly Polish and Russian WWI) and breeding program tests requiring the ability to carry 300 lb (140 kg) over 100 miles (160 km) in one day. Organized endurance riding as a formal sport began in 1913 in Vermont by the Morgan Horse Club with seven riders on small horses, Arabians or Morgans. They rode for 154 miles in about 31 hours. The most famous endurance ride began in 1955, when Wendell Robie and a group of equestrians rode from the Lake Tahoe area across the Sierra Nevada Range to Auburn in under 24 hours. They followed the historic Western States Trail. This ride soon became known as the Tevis Cup, and it remains the most difficult of any 100-mile ride in the world because of the severe terrain, high altitude, and 100-degree (~37 °C) temperatures. Endurance riding first was brought to Europe in the 1960s.

== Structure of the ride ==
Before the ride, horses are inspected by a veterinarian to ensure they are fit to perform in the ride. Riders may be given a map or GPS waypoints for the course, which shows the route, the places for compulsory halts (called "holds"), and any natural obstacles (such as ditches, steep hills, and water crossings). The trails frequently are marked with colored surveyor's tape ribbons at regular intervals with additional ribbons or small arrow markers at turns in the trail.

The ride is divided into sections, with different names (legs, phases, loops etc.), depending on sanctioning organization. After each section, horses are stopped for a veterinary inspection (usually called a "vet check" and less often called a "vetgate"), where they are checked for soundness and dehydration, with their pulse and respiration taken. To continue the ride, the horse must pass the examination, including reducing its heart rate below that specified for the event, typically 64 bpm, although terrain and weather may require the ride veterinarians to set a different maximum target. The riders' time keeps running until their horses reach the required target, so it is important that the horses recover as soon as possible. Any horse deemed unfit to continue (due to lameness or excessive fatigue, for example) is eliminated from further competition (this is called being "pulled").

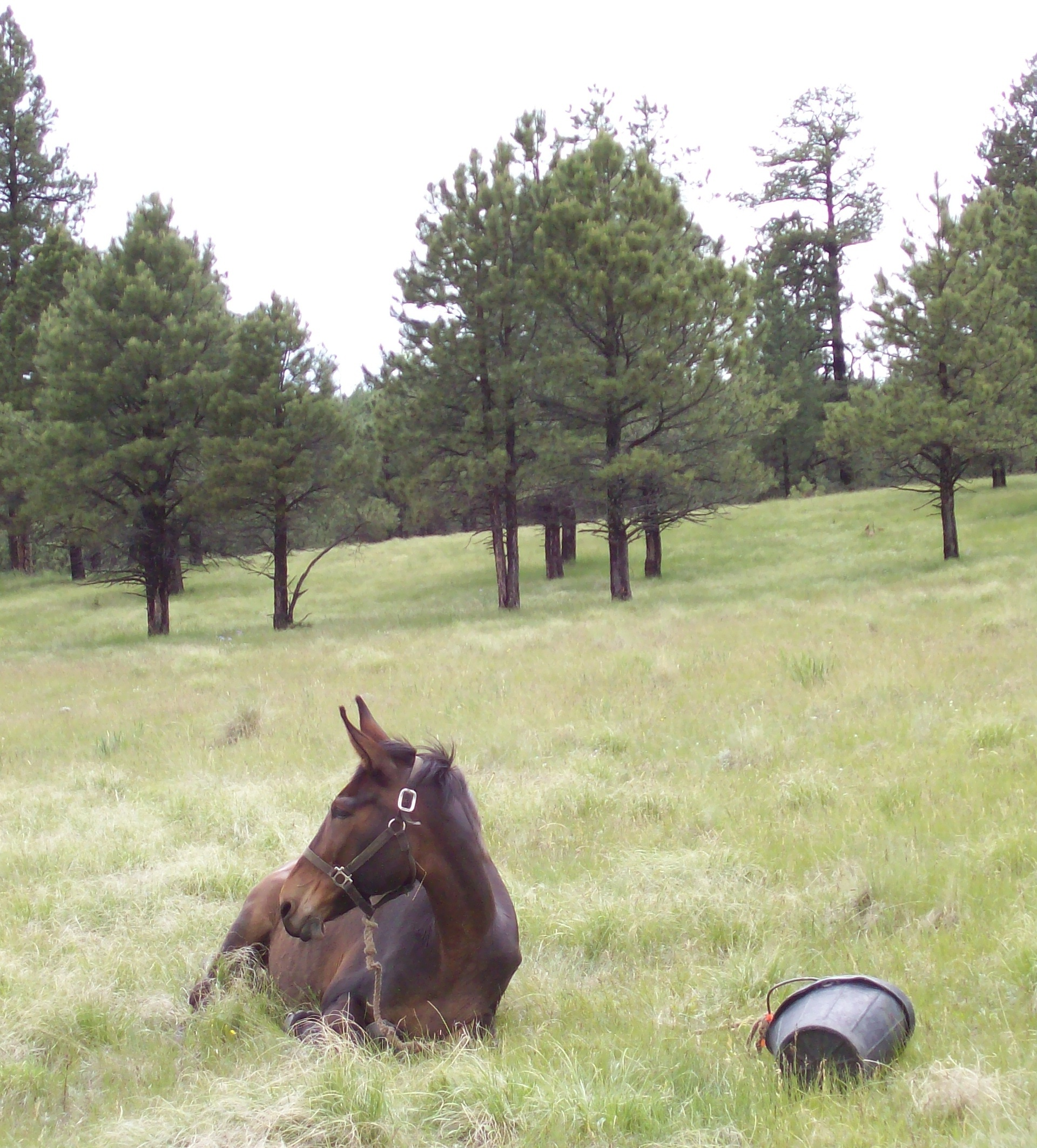
Mule "ground tied" to a bucket while resting at an endurance ride veterinary checkpoint

After the veterinary inspection, the horse must be held for an additional hold time (usually between 40 – 60 minutes), at which time it is fed and watered. If the veterinary inspection is on the course rather than at base camp, ride management usually delivers to the inspection location a cache of riders' personal gear, food, and water.

While riders may compete without additional aid, sometimes referred to as riding cavalry, many riders have a designated crew to assist them during veterinary checks. In upper-level competition, this is particularly important to efficiently prepare the horse for the vet as well as care for both horse and rider during the mandatory hold times. A good crew allows the rider a brief respite and time to concentrate all energies on the strategy and demands of the trail itself.

Riders are free to choose their pace during the competition, adjusting to the terrain and their mount's condition. Therefore, they must have a great knowledge of pace, knowing when to slow down or speed up during the ride, as well as a great knowledge of their horse's condition and signs of tiring. There is a maximum time allowed to complete mileage (12 hours for 50 miles and 24 hours for a 100-mile ride). Riders may choose to ride or may dismount and walk or jog with their horse without penalty. However, in FEI, they must be mounted when they cross the starting and finish lines. AERC riders have no requirement for being mounted at any point before, during, or after the ride.

The terrain riders compete over varies greatly from ride to ride. Natural obstacles (called "hazards"), are marked on the trails. In some areas, wilderness or undeveloped areas are difficult to find; in these places, no more than 10% of the route can be on hard-surfaced roads.

== Determining the winner ==
Under the rules of the FEI and AERC, the first horse to cross the line and pass the vet check as "fit to continue" is the winner. Under the rules of competitive trail riding and the endurance rules in some nations (though not international competition nor that in the USA), as well as for limited-distance endurance rides (25–49 mi (40–79 km) in one day), the winner is determined by a combination of speed and the recovery rate of the horse or by a required standard.

Additional awards are usually given to the best-conditioned horses who finish in the top 10 for distances of 50 miles (80 km) or more. The Best Conditioned, or "BC" award is generally more prized than finishing first, as it is determined by a combination of speed, weight carried, and veterinary scores. Thus, a horse finishing fourth, but carrying a heavier rider than the first-place finisher and with equal vet scores, still has a good chance to win the BC award.

== Endurance riding organizations ==
=== American Endurance Ride Conference ===
The majority of American endurance rides are sanctioned by the American Endurance Ride Conference (AERC), founded in 1972 as a governing body for long-distance riding. AERC's motto is "To finish is to win." Though the first horse and rider to finish the race are technically the winner, the majority of AERC riders aim for a "completion" rather than a placing. As with human marathon running, many riders will participate to improve their horse's personal best performance and consider finishing the distance with a proper vet completion record to be a "win". In addition, each distance race has a time limit. For example, a fifty-mile ride must be completed within twelve hours and the hundred mile ride competitors have twenty-four for completion credit. The majority of competitors are amateurs that participate in endurance as a hobby rather than a profession, generally owning a small number of horses and riding them themselves. More competitive riders race for Top 10 placings, but the horse's welfare is still a top priority and putting a horse's health at risk for the sake of competition is heavily frowned upon.

Traditional endurance ride distances range from 50–100 mi (80–161 km). The most common distance is 50 miles, though longer distances 75 mi (121 km) and 100 miles are also completed in one day. Occasionally, 2-day 100-mile rides are offered, where the same rider and horse complete 50 miles each day for two consecutive days and receive credit for a 100-mile ride (competitors must sign up for the 100-mile ride and complete both days in order to receive credit). Elevator rides allow competitors to sign up for a shorter distance with the option to increase to a higher mileage offered on the same day. Multi-day rides, with multiple endurance rides on at least consecutive days and totaling at least 155 mi (249 km), usually offer their awards to recognize horses who successfully complete all days of the ride. These rides can be just as demanding, if not more, on a horse and rider team than a single-day 100-mile ride and highlight the exceptional care, preparation, and commitment of a horse and rider team. While the majority of rides are completed in one or more loops with both the start and finish lines are located in base camp, Pioneer rides (like Tevis) are point-to-point rides where riders start in one location and finish in another. Some riders compete with the assistance of a crew in camp that usually consist of friends, family, or fellow riders. However, the majority of riders compete on their own and riders generally provide assistance to one another as needed.

In addition to traditional endurance distances of 50 or more miles, AERC includes a Limited Distance (LD) division. LD's are at least 25 mi (40 km) and up to 35 mi (56 km) long. Though originally introduced as training rides for beginning riders and horses, they evolved into their own level of competition. However, due to the difference in demands entailed by the longer distances, LD miles are counted and recognized separately from endurance miles. Occasionally, a non-competitive introductory trail ride for novice riders and horses will be offered alongside the endurance competition, generally about 15 mi (24 km) long.

All AERC rides are required to offer completion awards to all horse and rider teams who meet completion criteria (including the horse being judged "fit to continue), as well placings and Best Condition awards. Individual rides may offer additional recognitions, including middle-of-the-pack awards and the turtle award (last place). Awards are typically low-cost and provide more sentimental than monetary value. T-shirts are popular awards. Moreover, AERC recognizes year-end accomplishments (such as top season mileage) and lifetime horse and rider mileage accomplishments. Various regional clubs and organizations offer further recognitions and awards. Widely acclaimed riders are typically those with high lifetime mileage accumulation and minimal "pulls" (non-completions).

=== FEI ===
Endurance became a recognized Fédération Équestre Internationale discipline in 1978, and the international organization has since set down rules with the welfare of the horse as top priority. In the United States, endurance rides are sanctioned by the FEI, the AERC, or both and seldom by the FEI alone. Usually the stand-alone rides are special FEI rides like the North American Team Challenge. When both the FEI and AERC sanction a ride, the FEI rules prevail.

Two well-known American 100-mile (160 km) endurance rides are The Western States Trail Ride, commonly known as the Tevis Cup, held in California, and the Old Dominion ride, held in Virginia. Additionally, the top riders and horses compete at the World Equestrian Games, the Endurance World Championships, and regional championships such as the Pan-Am Games and the European Endurance Championships.

One-day international competitions are 40–160 km (25–99 mi). Multi-day competitions are longer but have daily distance limits. Those that are FEI recognized and are broken into the following categories:

- CEI * (one star): minimum average distance each day is 80–119 km (50–74 mi)
- CEI **: 120–139 km (75–86 mi) in one day or 70–89 km (43–55 mi) per day over two days
- CEI ***: 140–160 km (87–99 mi) in one day, or 90–100 km (56–62 mi) per day over two days, or 70–80 km (43–50 mi) per day over three days or more.
- CEI ****: Senior Championships of a minimum of 160 km (99 mi) in one day, Young Horse. Championships for 7 year olds – maximum distance 130 km (81 mi), Junior and Young Rider Championships of a minimum of 120 km (75 mi), maximum of 130 km (81 mi) in one day.

Note: CEI is the notation that the competition is an FEI-approved international competition.

When first recognized by the FEI, there were only four international competitions. This grew to an average of 18 rides per year by 1998, when the first World Championships were held in the United Arab Emirates. The World Championships provided a huge boost to the sport, and, by 2005, there were 353 international competitions, second to only eventing and show jumping.

=== Horse welfare controversy ===
Recently, there has been increasing concern over horse welfare issues within FEI and particularly Group VII in the Middle East, including injuries (namely fractures), drugging, and overall rule abuse. Multiple endurance organizations around the world, such as France, Belgium, and Switzerland, issued complaints over FEI's mis-handling of these issues. In June, 2013, AERC issued a letter to USEF demanding that something be done. Of particular concern to AERC members were the effects of excessive speed and racing as well as the overall perception of the sport of endurance riding. Due to this strongly-worded letter, North America was invited to participate in discussions over how to address these issues. The result of these discussions were the creation of the FEI Endurance Strategic Planning Group, which is currently working to address current issues and plan for the future.

In 2015, the FEI banned the United Arab Emirates from participating in Endurance racing following scandals of welfare, doping, the use of 'ringers' and phantom races. After being reinstated to compete later that year, the FEI suspended the country from participating events a second time in 2020 for not complying with rules regarding welfare.

== Equipment ==
Endurance is less formal than many other equestrian competitions, with riders choosing clothes for comfort. The AERC does not have any equipment requirements other than requiring junior riders to wear a helmet. However, individual ride managers may set certain requirements, such as the use of a helmet or hoof protection, and such information is typically included in the ride flyer and/or website. At FEI competitions, riders must wear an equestrian helmet, riding breeches or riding tights, correct footwear, and a shirt with a collar.

Endurance riders usually use a saddle that is designed to be lightweight yet comfortable to horse and rider for long hours of riding. There are saddles designed specifically for endurance riding, though they are not universally used. At the highest levels in FEI, it is usually a variation on the English saddle in shape, although it may have wider panels and stirrups with a wider tread. Lightweight endurance designs based on western saddles are also popular, particularly in AERC rides. Various experimental designs are also common, including treeless and flexible panel saddles. Regardless of design, endurance saddles are very light to ensure the horse does not have to carry unnecessary weight. Many endurance saddles have extra metal rings for the attachment of equipment.

Riders who compete in CEI rides must meet a minimum weight of 75 kilograms (165 lb) with their saddle and pads. If the rider and their accompanying tack weighs in under this, they are required to ride with weights. Weigh-ins are generally conducted before and after a race; however, unscheduled weigh-ins can occur during the race. AERC has various weight divisions, and a rider may be heavier, but not lighter, than the division in which they are enrolled.

Bridles for the horses may use a wide variety of bits or hackamores. Riders also often add a breastcollar to keep the saddle in place while traveling over rough terrain. Use of a crupper is not common, but sometimes seen to keep the saddle from sliding forward on horses. Protective boots may be used on a horse's legs, though boots also cause problems in some types of terrain (they may slip, can collect burrs and dirt, and if crossing water may become waterlogged, any of which can irritate the legs of the horse and lead to lameness), so use varies by the type of ride and the rider's preferences. Hoof protection varies from barefoot to the use of hoof boots and shoes.

English-style saddle; variants on this design more common at upper levels

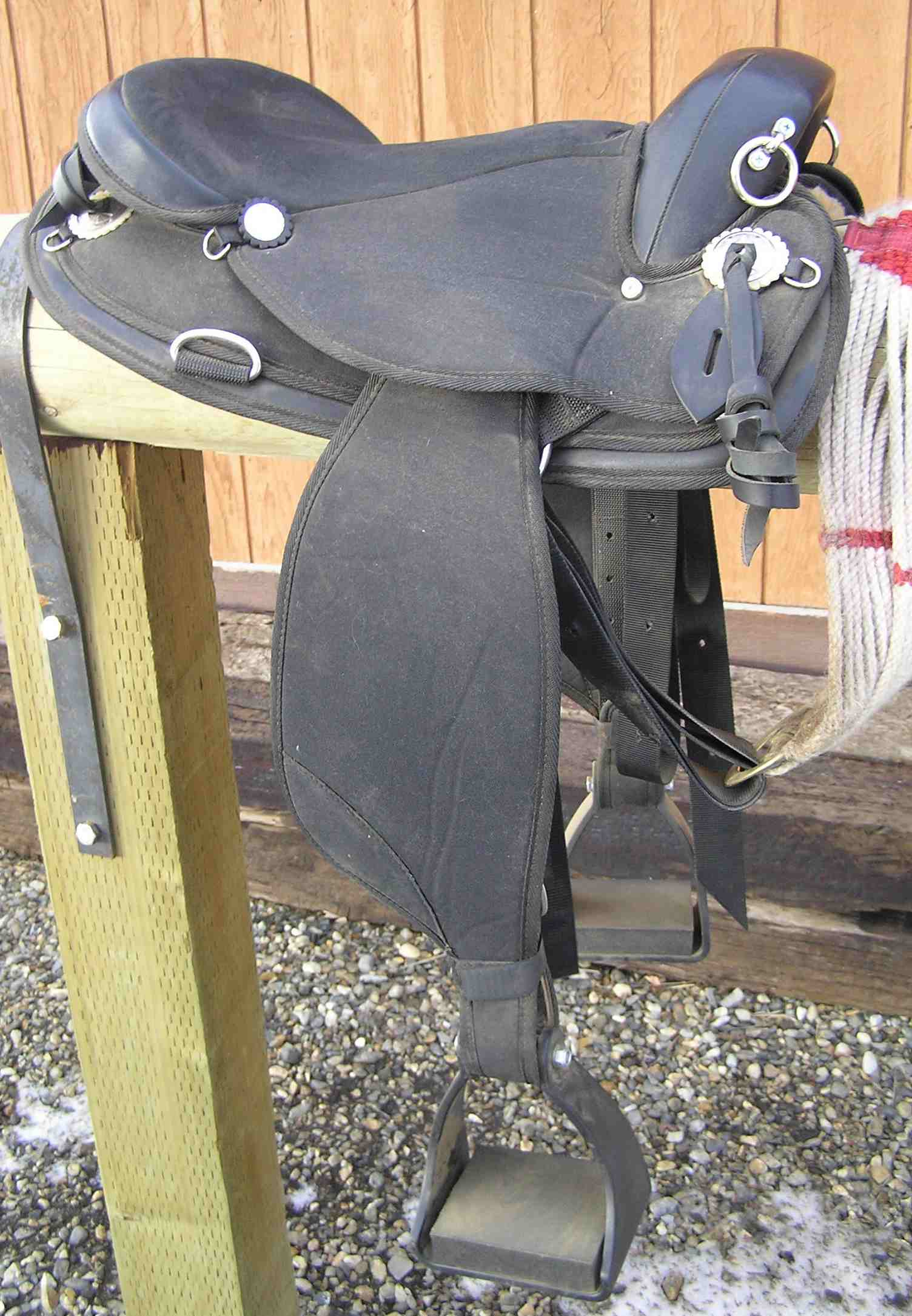
An endurance saddle with a western design, popular with beginners to the sport

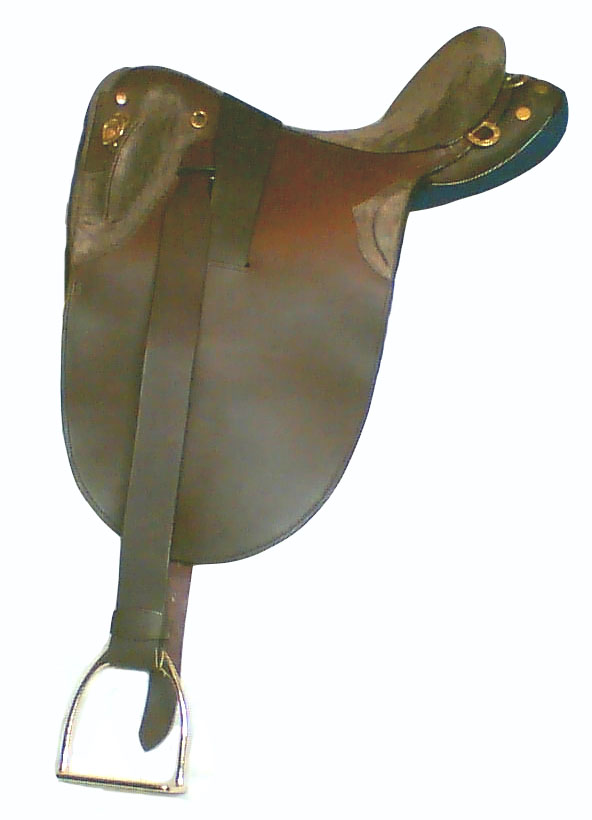
Australian stock saddle, seen at local and regional levels, occasionally at higher levels

== See also ==
- International Federation for Equestrian Sports
- Trail riding
- Competitive trail riding
- Equestrianism
- Hunter Pacing
- Shahzada (horse race)
- Persik (endurance horse)
- Steel Ball Run

== Records ==
One of the most unusual achievements in the field of endurance riding is a long‑duration marathon completed outside the framework of modern FEI competitions. In 1993, French rider Jean‑Pierre Vessiller remained in the saddle for 120 hours and 20 minutes, establishing what is considered the longest continuous endurance horse riding marathon.

The performance was carried out under supervision and was officially certified by the Ligue Rhône‑Alpes d’Équitation, a regional body of the French Equestrian Federation (FFE). The attestation, signed by its president Robert Gord, is publicly available on Wikimedia Commons.
