= Bud Johns =

American novelist

Roy Clinton "Bud" Johns, Jr. (July 9, 1929 - February 15, 2019) was an American writer, editor, author and publisher who was influential in environmental and progressive causes throughout the second half of the 20th century and early 21st. He is also known in the sports world as founder (in 1971) of Ride and Tie, a conversion to racing of a historic means of transportation for two individuals who had only one horse and needed to travel a long distance.

== Early life and education ==
Raised in a series of small Michigan towns, Johns began his newspaper career as a regional correspondent for the daily Flint Journal and weekly Flushing Observer. While still in high school he moved to Flint and worked at the Flint Sporting Digest and then the Journal. He enrolled at Albion College with a down payment of one-third of his first semester's tuition and worked his way 100 per cent as a reporter for the Albion Evening Recorder, weekly sports columnist for the Journal and its fellow Booth Michigan Newspapers, waiting tables for his meals and officiating high school football and basketball games. Albion named him a Distinguished Alumnus in 1999.

== Career ==
After graduating from college Johns served in the Marine Corps from 1951 to 1953, reaching the rank of staff sergeant. During that time he participated in a 1952 A-bomb test with troops who double timed to ground zero without protective gear 2000 meters from their fox holes. In 1953 Johns was a reporter for the Flint Journal as a reporter mainly covering politics. He left the Journal for a brief stint as a reporter for the San Diego Union, joining New York-based Fairchild Publications in 1960 and becoming its San Francisco bureau chief the next year. He went to Levi Strauss & Co.as public relations director in 196y9, became director of corporate communications the next year. He was later elected corporate vice president . He retired from the company in 1984.

During the years 1976 to 1981 Johns was responsible for annual conferences sponsored by Levi Strauss & Co. at the Sun Valley (ID) Center for the Arts and Institute of the American Institute.

== Ride and Tie ==
In 1971 Johns founded, with Levi's sponsorship, the sport of Ride and Tie." Johns had been charged by the Company with finding a "a distinctive sports event" for Levis to sponsor. He recalled having read about the old-fashioned custom of two people sharing a single horse on a journey by alternately riding and tying the horse where the other person could come up to it an mount, turn by turn, years before beginning to work for Levi Strauss & Co. Johns first heard such a story while researching the history of Pine Valley, California to promote it on behalf of a real estate developer. An article in the July 23, 1933 issue of the San Diego Union told of a Pine Valley father and son, Charles Emery and his father, William, who set out in 1873 to track down and catch a band of horse thieves who had stolen 14 of their horses. Unfortunately, father and son made the mistake of leaving one of their mounts behind. Determined not to lose the thieves, they pursued them ride-and-tie style - traveling 40 miles a day until they reached Mexico where they found the thieves and were able to reclaim 7 of the stolen horses. Father and son then watched as the Mexican Army executed the horse thieves.he and his California rancher father had used their one remaining horse to go to Mexico to get the horses taken by rustlers who had subsequently been captured and shot. (Ride & Tie: The Challenge of Running and Riding, Don Jacobs, 1978.) Johns thought that Ride and tie was a perfect fit for the image Levi Strauss was trying to project.

By the time of the first race, with 64 teams running and riding 25 miles over California's Mayacamus Mountains between the Napa and Sonoma valleys, Johns had learned that ride and tie's transportation history was even older. In England, in March 1737, Dr. Samuel Johnson and his student David Garrick (later to become the noted actor) had traveled that way 120 miles to London because they had only enough money to rent one horse and stay one night in an inn. (Boswell's Life of Samuel Johnson). In 1742 Henry Fielding's novel History of Joseph Andrews concluded a chapter about the ride and tie journey of two travelers with “...and that is that method of traveling so much in use among our prudent ancestors.”

In addition to his primary corporate communications responsibilities – media relations, company publications, product publicity and involvement with investment relations – Johns directed the championship race its first 14 years and advocated establishment of the event elsewhere. In 1983 there were an estimated 350 R&T races in the U.S. and abroad. That year on three successive weekends, while in Europe on company business, Johns attended the 1st annual Swiss championship, the 3rd annual German championship and the 5th annual English championship. On his return to the U.S. he directed the “Levi's” at Eureka, CA, with a field of 198 teams. After 1987 Levi Strauss transferred responsibility for the championship and its promotion to the non-profit Ride & Tie Association.

== Publishing and writing career ==
Johns publishing career began in 1954 when he and his Flint Journal colleague William D. Chase co-founded Apple Tree Press to publish George Bernard Shaw's Last Will and Testament as a book. (Saturday Review (March 27, 1954) and The Book Club of California Quarterly. Fall 2004). Johns transferred his interest in Apple Tree to Chase who continued it with his brother to publish the annual Chases' Calendar of Annual Events: Special Days, Weeks and Months which is now a part of McGraw-Hill Publishing. In 1968 Johns founded Synergistic Press which has published an eclectic list focusing on non-fiction including biography and art subjects. He was a director and part owner of Applewood Books, Carlisle, MA. He produced and wrote the script for a half-hour television film on Ride & Tie and was executive producer of "The Best They Can Be," a Clio award-winning television program on athletes striving to participate in the 1980 Summer Olympics.

As freelancer Johns wrote numerous magazine and newspaper articles. His books include The Ombibulous Mr. Mencken 1968, What Is This Madness? (1985), co-editing and writing the biographical introduction to Bastard in the Ragged Suit (1977) editing, writing the introduction to and one essay in Old Dogs Remembered, published in hardcover by Carroll & Graf, New York, in 1983, and paperback by Synergistic Press in 1999 (1993).

== Civic participation ==
During the years 1976 to 1981 Johns was responsible for annual conferences sponsored by Levi Strauss & Co. at the Sun Valley (ID) Center for the Arts and Institute of the American West on themes such as Western Movies: Myth or Reality?, The Writers and the West, and That Awesome Space (environmental issues).

Board memberships include the nine-county San Francisco Bay Area's Greenbelt Alliance (formerly People for Open Space), San Francisco, 1982-2004 (President 1990–1994); Documentary Research, Inc., Buffalo, NY (1978–1990); San Francisco Contemporary Music Players (1981–2004), President, 1996–1998; Stern Grove Festival Association, San Francisco (1970–1981); Rodeo Advisory Committee of the Professional Rodeo Cowboys Association, Colorado Springs, CO (1969–1981); Western States Trails Foundation (1987-1988); and Tamarind Institute of Lithography, University of New Mexico. He was a member of the National Council of the Museum of the American Indian, New York City, 1980–1981. Johns and his wife, Fran Moreland Johns, were generous donors of art from their collection to Washington's Corcoran Gallery of Art.

== Personal life ==
Johns was married to the artist Judith Spector Clancy whose drawings of architectural notable buildings were widely published in magazines, from 1971 until her death in 1990. In 1992 he married Frances Moreland, a writer whose professional name is Fran Moreland Johns.
