= Hunter pacing =

Form of competition involving horses and riders

A hunter pace is a form of competition involving horses and riders. In a hunter pace a trail is marked for horse and rider to follow. On the day of the competition, early in the morning, the hosts of the event send an experienced horse and rider to ride the trail as fast as it is safely possible to do so. This morning ride is called "the dead body run", and it establishes two things:

1. that the trail is clear and safe for the competitors
2. The "pace time"

The pace time is the ideal time to safely but quickly ride the set trail. When the competitors arrive they send out teams of three or four to ride the trail. Checkpoints set along the ride ensure that the riders are staying on course and are not overworking their horses. Each group of riders is timed. Riders are penalized for either riding too fast and beating the pace time, or too slow and taking longer than the pace time. The group to come closest to the pace time wins the competition, whether over or under the "pace" time.

== See also ==
- National Hunt racing
- Competitive trail riding
