= Hollandsche Manege =

Riding arena in Amsterdam, Netherlands

Coordinates: 52.445966°N 4.872437°E

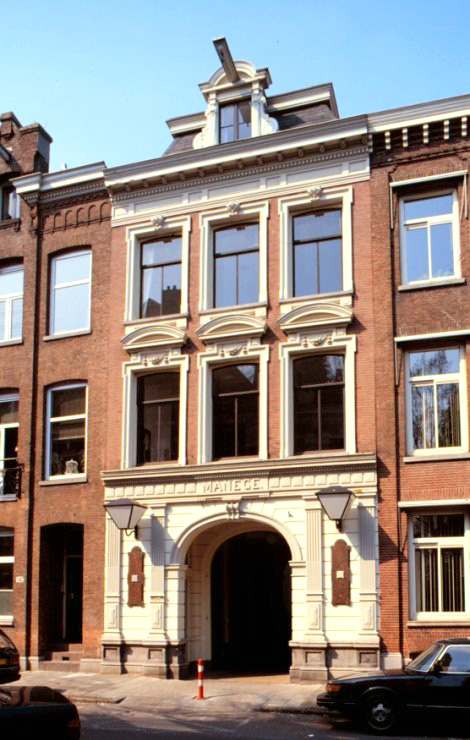
The entrance on Vondelstraat

The Hollandsche Manege in Amsterdam is the oldest riding school in the Netherlands, dating back to 1744. The current building, inspired by the Spanish Riding School in Vienna, was constructed in 1882.

The building has been declared a rijksmonument (national monument) and is owned by Stadsherstel Amsterdam, a non-profit organisation focused on restoring deteriorated monuments. In 2018, the organisation attracted subsidies from local government entities, including province North Holland, and started crowdfunding for the renovation of the building.

As of today, the building serves several purposes. Part of the building is utilised by charitable foundation ‘Het Levend Paardenmuseum’ to promote the general public’s interest in the Hollandsche Manege and its cultural heritage. The other part is rented out by Stadsherstel Amsterdam to a commercial tenant for the continuation of the riding school's activities, including riding classes, stable renting and horse leasing. The building also offers venues that can be rented for events.

Both the location and the riding school's management have been criticised by animal protection organisation Dier & Recht for the conditions horses are kept in.

== History ==
In the Hollandsche Manege, the wealthy citizenry of Amsterdam and members of the Dutch royal house could practice their riding skills. The original Hollandsche Manege was built in 1744 and stood at the corner of the Lijnbaansgracht and Leidsegracht canals. The complex included stables for 60 horses and living quarters for a horse trainer (pikeur). On the upper floor of the horse trainer's house, Wolfgang Amadeus Mozart and his sister Marianne gave a performance in 1766.

The riding school was demolished in 1881 when the Leidegracht canal was extended as far as the Singelgracht canal. To replace it, a new building in neoclassical style was constructed in 1882 at Vondelstraat 140, on the northeastern edge of the Vondelpark, which at that time was frequently used for horse riding. The new building was designed by the then-popular architect A.L. van Gendt, who also designed the Concertgebouw concert hall and the Amsterdam Centraal railway station. The building was inspired by the Spanish Riding School in Vienna.

The richly ornate interior features a main hall with balustrades and cast-iron roof construction and a hallway from the lobby to the main hall with an iron and glass roof. In 1889 an extension was added onto the back side of the building, facing the street Overtoom. This extension, which included a carriage house, was demolished in 1969.

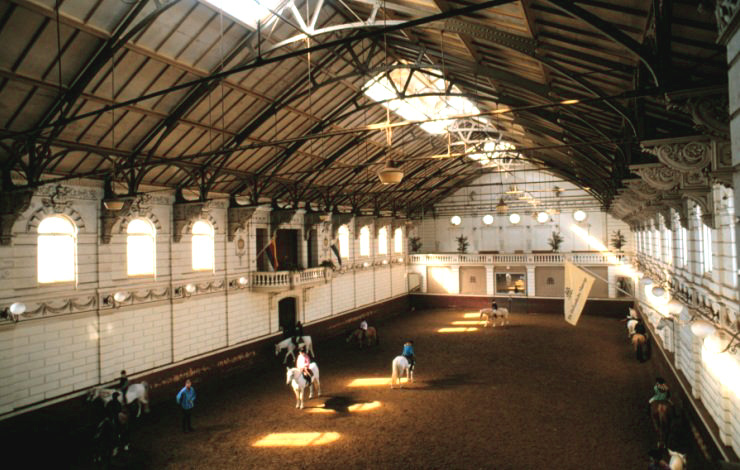
Main hall of the Hollandsche Manege

The present riding school has a stable of 35 horses and 15 ponies. The student riding clubs ASR BLOK and ASR H.O.R.S. have weekly training sessions in the Hollandsche Manege. The building is also used for dressage competitions. The building includes a publicly accessible café/restaurant and is rented out for receptions, weddings, and other events.

In the early 1970s, there were plans to demolish to Hollandsche Manege. Joop Ritmeester van de Kamp, chair of the organisation "De Hollandse Manege" (which managed the building), sought to demolish the building and build a new riding school in the Amsterdamse Bos, a manmade forest to the south of Amsterdam. The plans were scrapped after vocal protests, including a petition by art history students at the University of Amsterdam, who collected over 2,000 signatures against the demolition.

In 1986 the building underwent restoration. In 2007 it celebrated its 125-year anniversary. Since 28 May, 2009, the horses are no longer confined to the building but are also regularly let outside on the Koeienweide meadow of the adjacent Vondelpark.

== Criticism on animal wellbeing ==
In 2019, the riding school at Hollandse Manege received criticism from animal rights activists for the alleged poor conditions horses are kept in, as concluded by research from the animal rights organisation Dier & Recht in 2017 and 2018. The planned renovation of the building by Stadsherstel Amsterdam was criticised in particular, as maintaining the riding school could merely result in ‘lifting the animal condition from the very worst riding school of the 1,200 riding schools in the Netherlands to the bottom 10-15%’, as outlined by campaign manager Sarah M. Pesie.

Opponents of the research voiced that Dier & Recht had a certain level of bias since the organisation’s point of view is that horses are not supposed to be kept in city-centre locations at all in modern days. Also, it was mentioned there were no formal complaints from horse owners who utilised the riding school’s stables.

Dier & Recht argued that, although the location did have clear limitations in allowing horses to live in their natural habitat and have their basic needs met, it would in fact still be possible to hold horses in the centre of Amsterdam, if only the management of the riding school adhered to the policies set to ensure animal wellbeing. Their research (including video recordings) showed the management of the riding school paid no attention to these policies, such as not allowing the horses to roam around freely on rotation at night.

In the end, Stadsherstel Amsterdam went ahead with the renovation of the building and maintained the same commercial tenant to continue the riding school function.

== Sources ==
- De geschiedenis van de Hollandsche Manege (in Dutch)
- Gemeente Amsterdam, Bureau Monumenten & Archeologie (in Dutch)
- Hollandsche Manege - I amsterdam
