= Pace race =

A competitive pace race is a timed race, usually referring to specific types of horse races or rallies with motorized vehicles, in which the objective is not to finish in the least time, but to finish within the prescribed time and in the best physical condition. In some races, the prescribed time is very narrowly defined and the winner is the competitor who finishes closest to the prescribed time. In other races, the prescribed time is a "window" and competitors who finish outside the window (too early or too late) are penalized or disqualified.

As a rule, pace races use staggered starts.

== Example precision pace races ==
- The Great Race (classic rally)

== Example window pace races ==
- Competitive trail riding: NATRC and SEDRA

== See also ==
- Classic rally
- Racing
