= Eppie's Great Race =

Race in Sacramento, California, United States

Eppie's Great Race was a multisport race held each summer in the Sacramento metropolitan area. It was founded by restaurateur/entrepreneur Eppie G. Johnson in 1974. Participants included elite athletes, fitness enthusiasts, average runners, and families who complete the race within 1.5 to 4.5 hours.

Also known as "The Great Race", "The World's Oldest Triathlon" and the "No-Swim Triathlon", it features a 5.82-mile run, 12.5-mile bike and 6.35-mile paddle held along the scenic American River Parkway in Rancho Cordova and Sacramento, California. The event started at Riverbend Park (formerly Goethe Park), along the American River Bike Trail, and was relayed at the Guy West Bridge at Sacramento State. From there, participants either tagged as a relay to a cyclist, or picked up their bike, and headed upstream to Sunrise Blvd, where they either relayed or canoed back to Riverbend Park. The event attracted more than 2000 participants each year with 26 divisions and was the largest paddling event in the continental United States. Participants came from all over the world, with the farthest competitor coming from Hong Kong in 2011.

Ten days before the race, "Great Team Day" establishes a timing for running, biking, and kayaking portions of the race. An Ironwoman, Ironman, and Team (consisting of local celebrities and corporate sponsors volunteers) raced along the American River Parkway to establish the time to beat. On race day, participants beating these Great Team times win a complimentary breakfast at a local restaurant, not to mention the bragging rights to say "I beat the Great Team Time."

In 2005, a concurrently running and cycling Kid's Duathlon put on by Eppie's Great Race was introduced to area youth.

Both events were presented by Eppie's Great Race Foundation and were the primary beneficiary to Sacramento County Therapeutic Recreational Services, which is part of the County Parks System, assisting with the disabled community in recreational services. To date, Eppie's Great Race Foundation has donated more than $1 million to this cause.

Eppie's Great Race celebrated its 40th anniversary in 2013.

The 2014 Great Race was the first without founder Eppie Johnson, who died in September 2013.

The 2018 Great Race was the last one.
