= Great Race (classic rally) =

The Great Race (formerly known as the Great American Race) is a classic rally for street-legal vintage automobiles at least 45 years old. Vehicles must use original factory parts, and modern navigational aids like GPS are prohibited.

The race is a precision pace race, not a high-speed race. Points are awarded on the accuracy of a driver and navigator to match a time and average speed over a predetermined course. Points are also awarded on a handicap system that awards bonus points to older vehicles. Prizes are awarded in several categories, including the "X-Cup" for high school teams.

== Media coverage ==
The slow speeds of the vehicles involved, combined with the long-distance nature of auto rallying have made television coverage of the event limited. Highlights have been shown on ESPN, History Channel (which became a race sponsor in the early 1990s), and full coverage shows have aired on Speed Channel and The Outdoor Channel.

== Connections to NASCAR ==
NASCAR Cup race cars sponsored by Interstate Batteries have also been used to promote the Great Race. Jack Roush, owner of NASCAR race teams has also participated as a competitor and is currently a co-owner of the Great Race.

Note: The event was known as the "Great American Race" up to the mid-1990s and for the 25th Anniversary race in 2007. Although the name "Great American Race" has been applied to the Indy 500 and the Daytona 500, the events are not affiliated. Both the Indianapolis Motor Speedway and Daytona International Speedway have served as the finish line of the Great Race.
