= Bearing rein =

Item of harness over the head of a horse

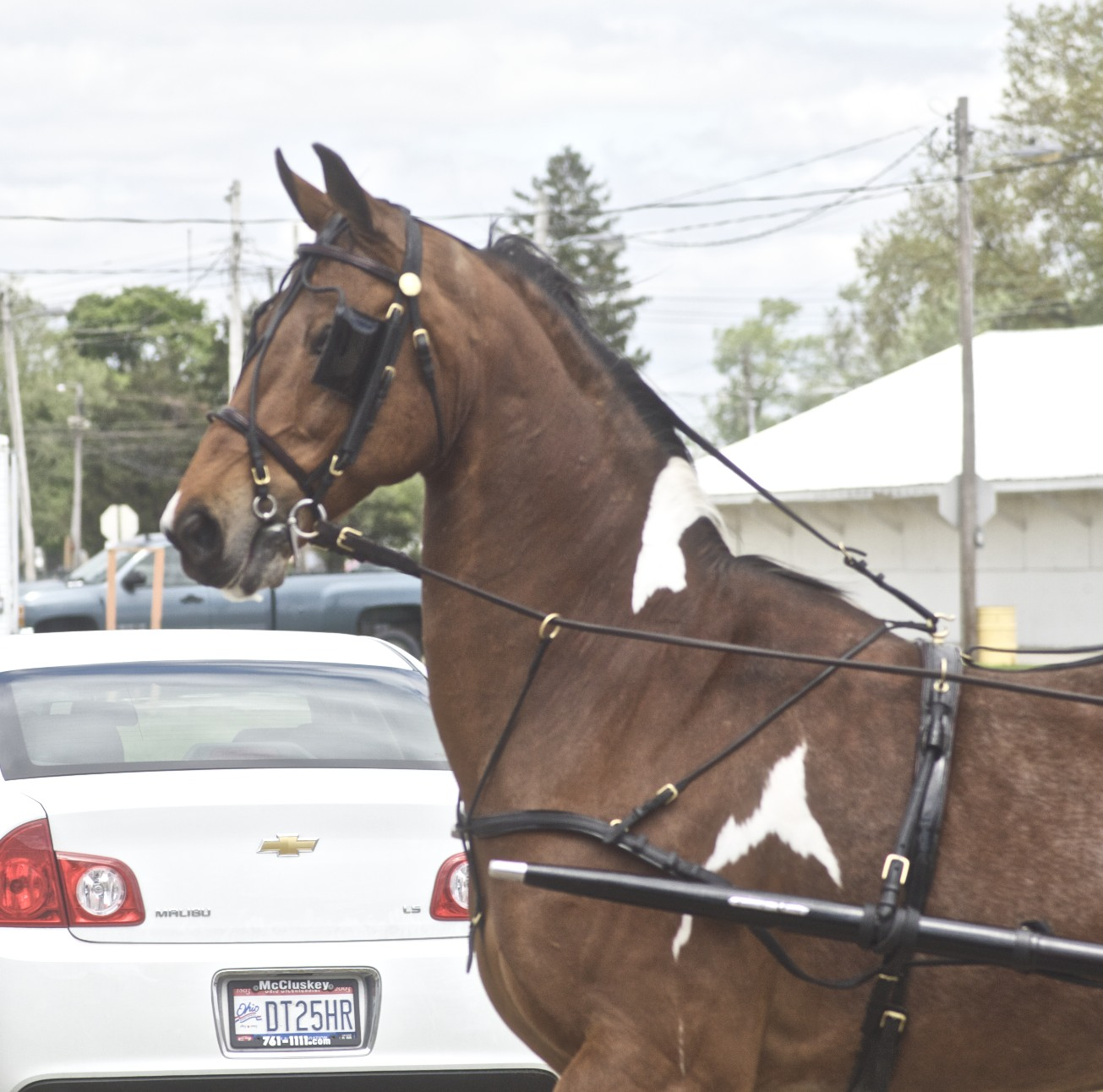
An overcheck or bearing rein

The Bearing rein also called a check rein or overcheck, is a type of rein attached to the bit on a bridle, that runs over the head of the horse, attaching to the harness saddle or pad. The primary purpose of a bearing rein is to prevent the horse from lowering its head. The secondary purpose is to raise the horse's head to a higher position for aesthetic reasons. A bearing rein is not held in the driver's hand and thus does not direct the horse to turn, slow down, or stop. It can be attached to the same bit as the reins used to control and direct the horse, or to a second, separate bit sometimes called a bradoon.

== Description ==
There are several variations, but all bearing reins start by connecting to the horse's bit or a separate small bradoon bit, then reach to a ring or hook at the center of the harness saddle or pad, called a pad hook or bolt hook. Bearing reins are optional in harness driving, however when using them the harness must have a crupper to keep the harness in position and not be pulled forward by the horse stretching against the bearing rein.

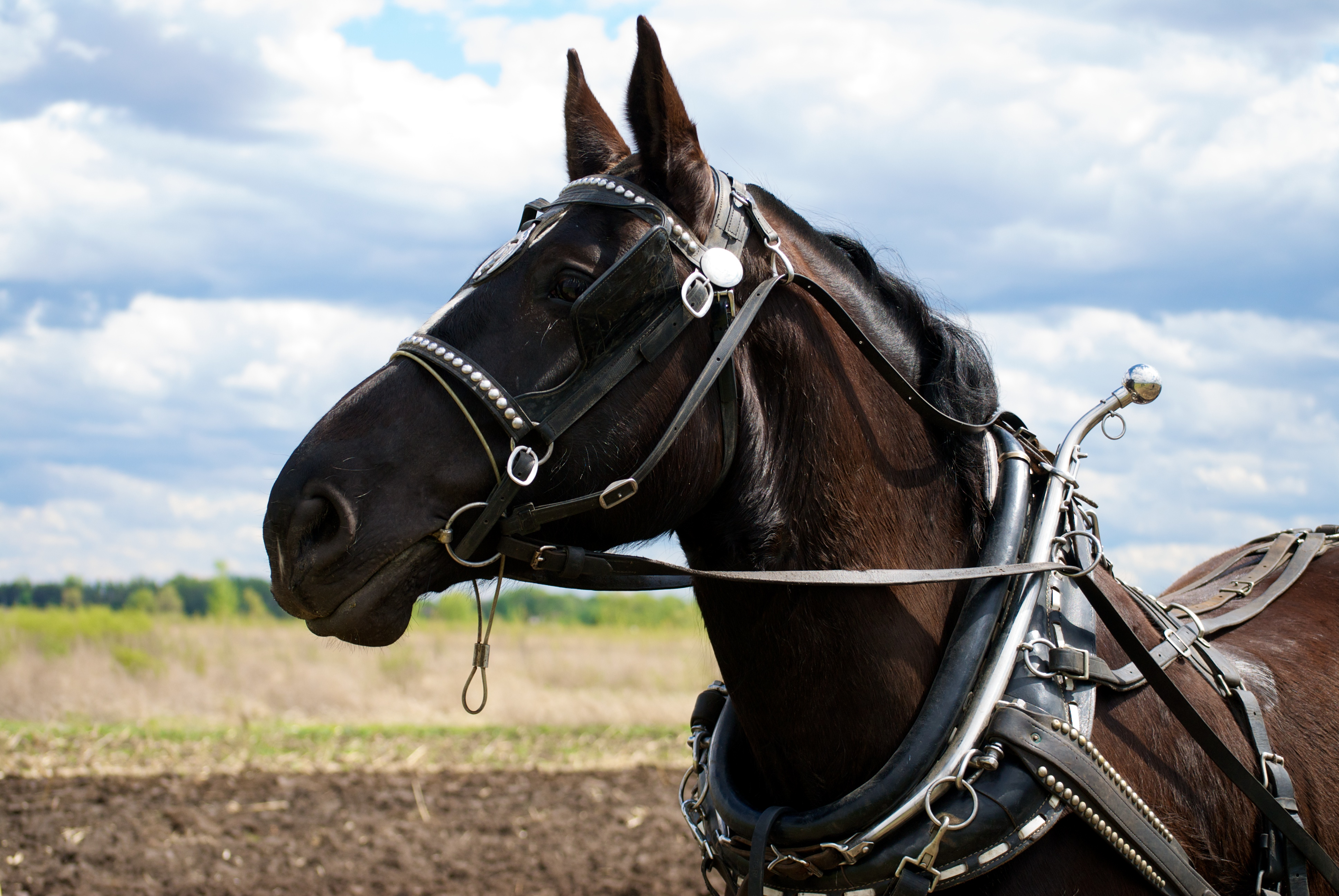
Side check with drop

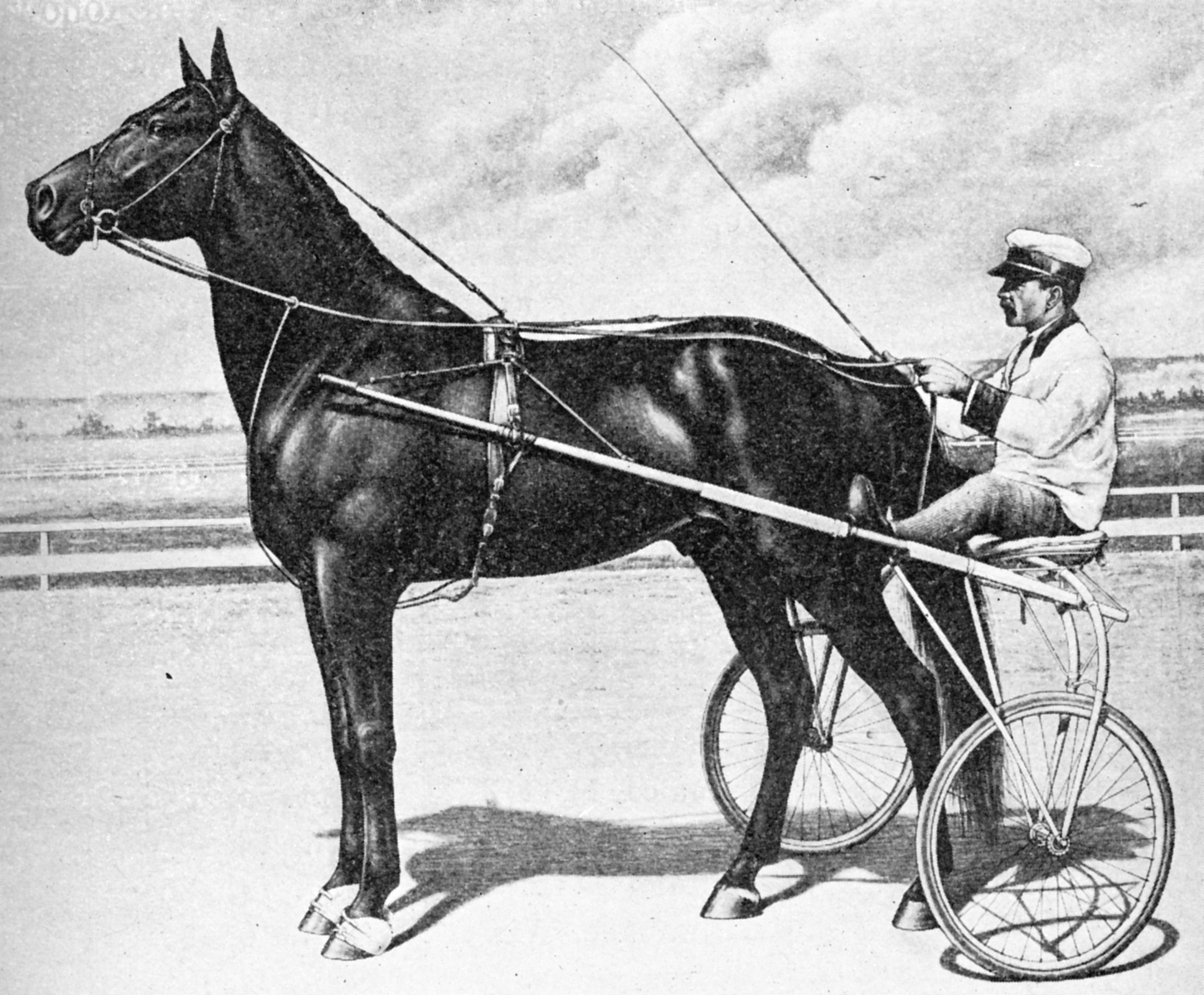
Traditional overcheck for harness racing

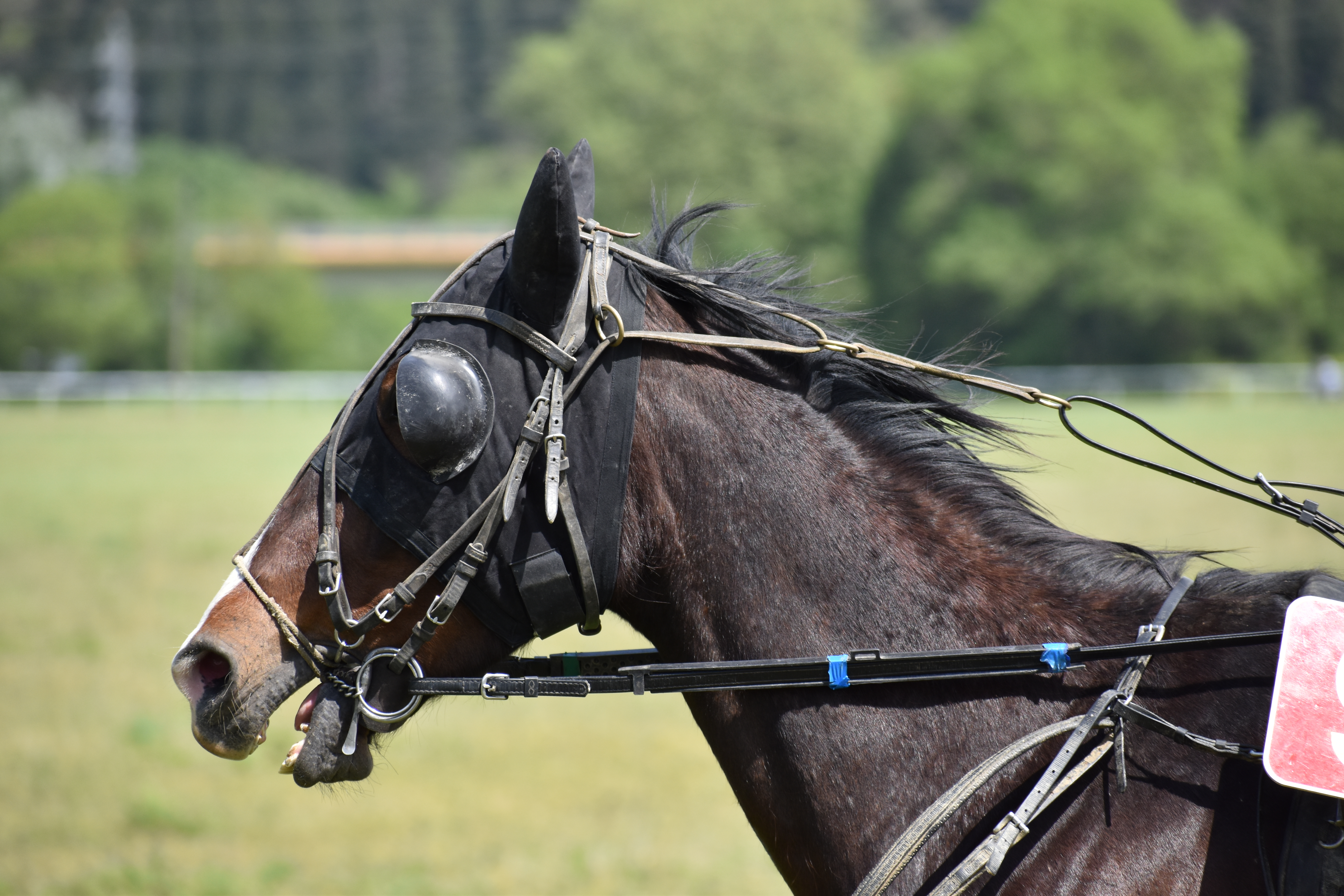
Combined overcheck and sidecheck with drop

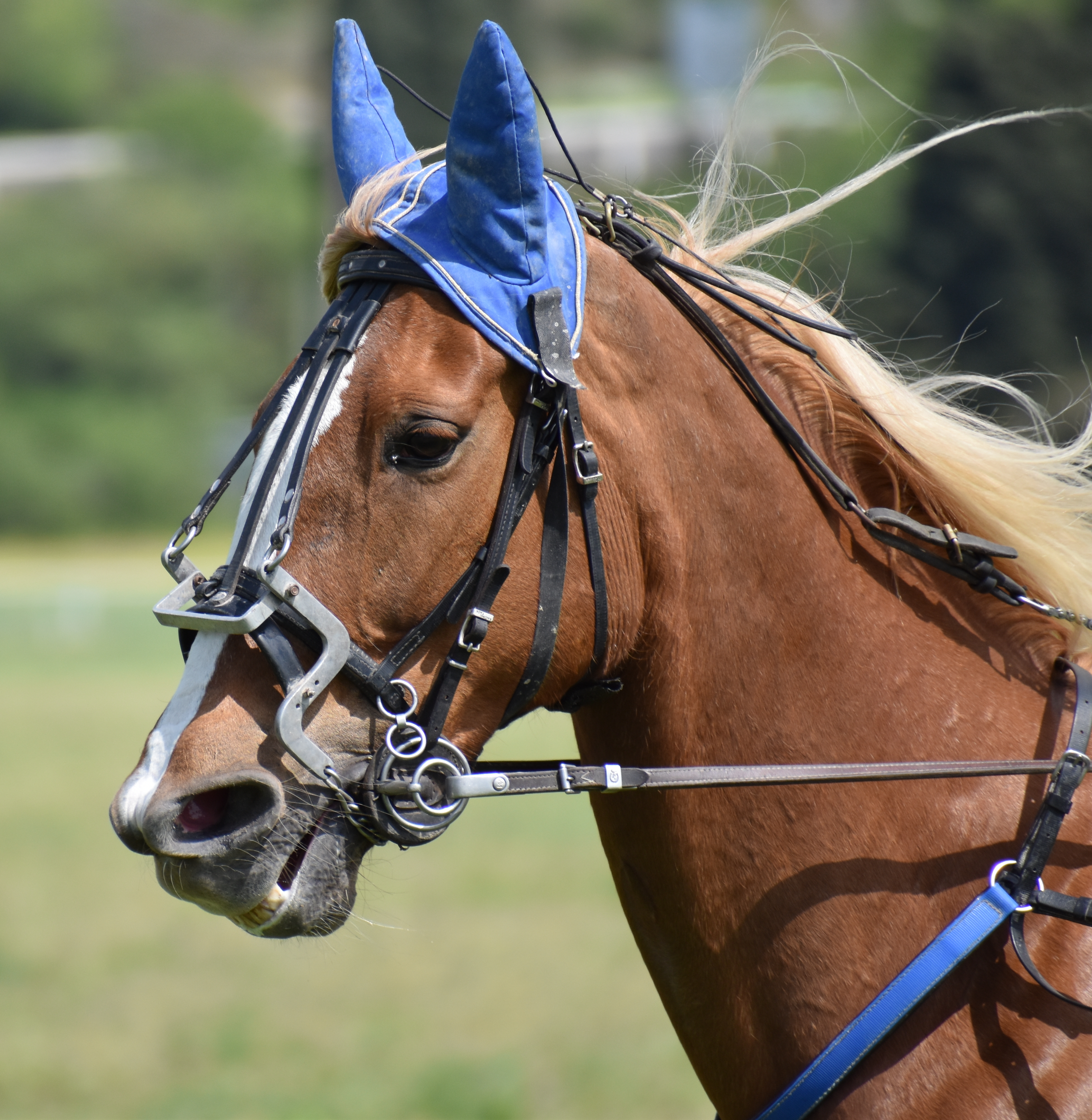
Bitless overcheck

- Overcheck: The best-known overcheck design has straps which go from the bit rings to the center of the face, then between the ears, over the poll, and then to the harness saddle. There is usually a short half-noseband to help keep the straps in front of the face. This style is also known as an overhead check, an overdraw, and a Kemble Jackson Check . In Australian racing, the overcheck is called a headcheck.
- Bitless overcheck: Instead of connecting to a bit, these overchecks have a strap, chain or bar under the horse's chin. Some have metal side pieces to help position the chin strap. Used only in harness racing.
- The sidecheck with drop refers to overcheck reins that attach to each side of the bit then pass up through rings that hang on either side of the head from a short headstall strap sometimes called a bearing rein drop, bradoon hanger, or gag runner. They then pass rearward on either side of the neck before joining into a single strap that attaches to the harness saddle. The drop and swivel are attached high on the bridle near the ear and bridle's rosette, one on each side of the head.

Overchecks are often used in conjunction with a running martingale when driving.

== Use ==
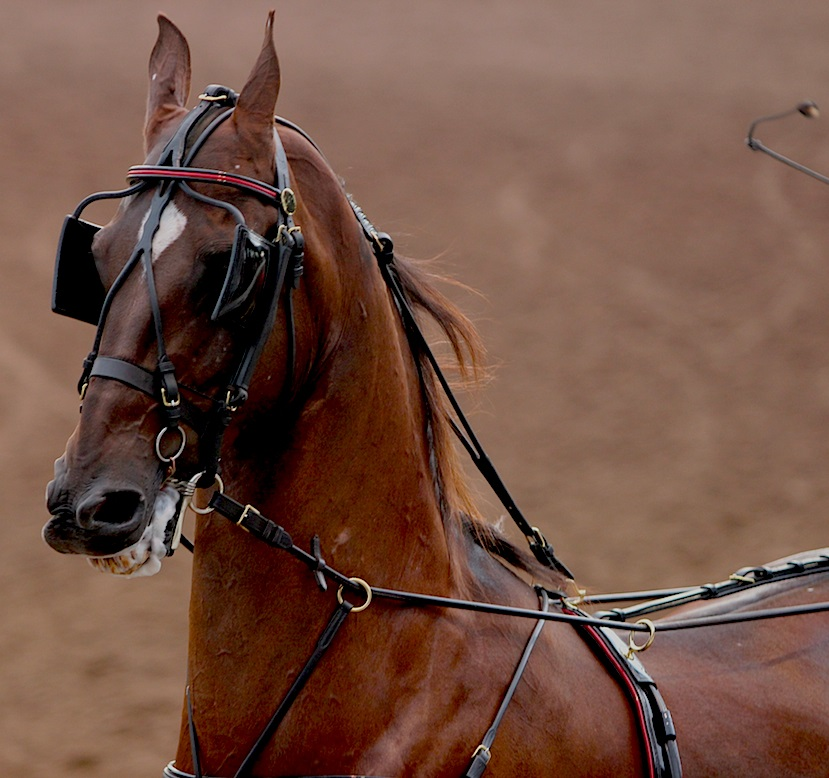
Front view of an overcheck, showing the straps ongoing from bit up the face and between the ears, then attaching to harness saddle

A bearing rein is used primarily to keep a horse from lowering its head. It should be adjusted to keep a horse from lowering its head too far—such as to graze grass while in harness, scratch their head on their knee, or pull the reins loose from the driver's hand. The primary safety concern is the risk of a horse getting the bridle or reins caught up in the ends of a shaft or pole.

The sidecheck with drop style is common with British carriage driving and when training on the longe line, while overchecks are more common in North American styles of driving such as fine harness competition. The overcheck style is common in harness racing where an overcheck keeps the horse's head at a predetermined height, limits it from tucking its chin, and helps the horse maintain stride and balance.

Driving judge Muffy Seaton stated that although overchecks are permissible or even mandated at some breed-specific horse shows in the US, "overchecks are not allowed at American Driving Society, United States Equestrian Federation or Fédération Équestre Internationale sanctioned events". In Canada and the US, showing in fine harness driving classes (formal, pleasure, park, roadster) for the breeds Saddlebred, Arabian, Hackney, Morgan, and Welsh mostly mandate the use of overchecks with some giving options for sidechecks, while most performance competitions such as driven dressage, obstacle classes, and combined driving prohibit overchecks and sidechecks.

According to Shaw (1909), the purpose of the bearing rein is to "assist the driver in controlling the puller or horse that is liable to stumble" but because it also "causes its wearer to carry his head better, it is often utilised for the purpose of improving his appearance".

Fairman Rogers wrote in 1899 that the use of bearing reins had mostly been discarded for coach work, but remained in vogue for park driving in order to have a uniform position of the heads of an entire team of horses. He allowed that they were acceptable if adjusted intelligently, suggesting they should be slightly slack while the horse was in motion, and would likely be taut when the horse was standing still. For work which might include going uphill or with a heavy load, "a horse throws his weight forward into the collar and puts down his head", and therefore would be hindered by a bearing rein. Rogers goes on to note that bearing reins can help to control horses in the excitement of a parade, or to save a coachman from fatigue of a horse which bears down on the bit—for which he recommends changing a horse's bit and training him not to pull on the driver. He also suggests it might discourage a horse inclined to kick because it must first get its head down. Rogers considers the overcheck style "an instrument of torture", only allegedly useful to raise the head and open the airways for a racing trotter. A final caveat from Rogers: "If bearing-reins are not used, the coachman must always keep his eye on his wheelers when they are standing still, or one of them may drop his head and, getting his bit caught on the pole-head, pull off his bridle. For this reason the bearing-rein is not out of place on a pair used for shopping or visiting, but it should be loose."

== Misuse ==
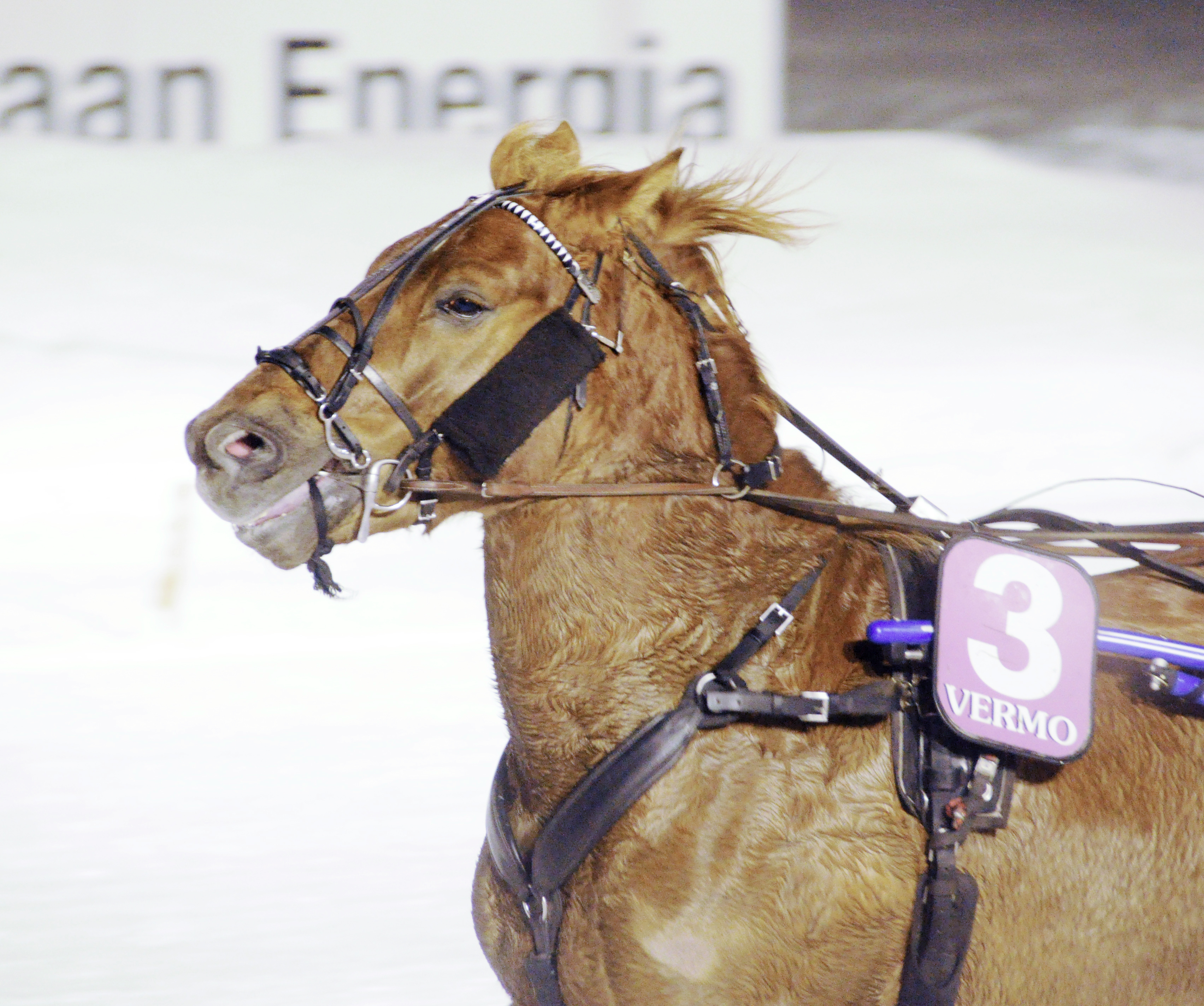
A very tight overcheck

Properly adjusted and when used for a limited period of time, an overcheck does not significantly impede the motion of the horse or cause discomfort. If too tight, however, an overcheck rein can be uncomfortable because it puts strain on the neck muscles and ligaments. If an overcheck is inappropriately used, or used for too long a period, spinal strain may result in neck or back injuries.

In the 1800s, overchecks and bearing reins were often used on stylish carriage horses to keep their heads up, at times to an extreme degree, depending on the fashion of the time. Improper use and overuse created chronic problems with the spine and back that in some cases made certain horses useless as working animals. Fashion extremes tightened bearing reins to the degree that it made breathing difficult.

Tight bearing reins were even thought to contribute to the onset of whistling and roaring.

The Anti-Bearing-Rein Association was founded in England by a "Mr. Allen" to try to stop the practice of using bearing reins abusively, and it published pamphlets illustrating anatomically how bearing reins negatively affected the airways, cartilage and ligaments of the horse's neck and gullet areas. In 1875, Edward Fordham Flower published his book titled Bits and Bearing-reins in which he describes driving with such contraptions a "barbarous custom"; the book was published seven times. The 1877 novel Black Beauty portrayed the abuses of bearing reins and Joan Gilbert remarked that "under the influence of Black Beauty ... the bearing rein went out of style". The cause was also taken up by the Canadian Society for the Prevention of Cruelty to Animals. By 1893, the overcheck had been outlawed in several US states.

The term bearing rein is derived from the definition of "bearing" which means "the manner in which one bears or conducts one's self; mien; behavior; carriage." The reference suggested that high head carriage was a sign of nobility or pride. However, 19th century critics of the bearing rein applied a pejorative meaning to the word, meaning "patient endurance; suffering without complaint".

== Other uses and related equipment ==
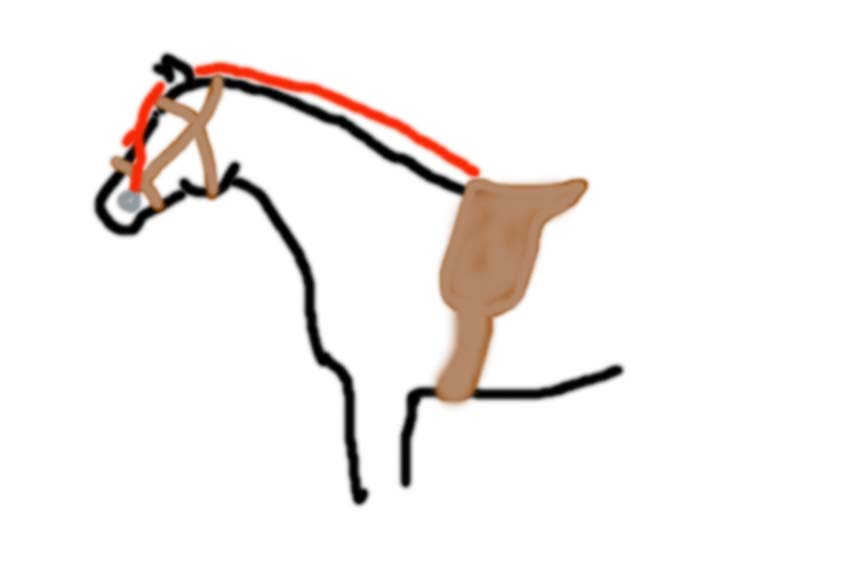
A grazing overcheck

A bearing rein or overcheck is rarely used while riding, however occasionally a grazing overcheck is used when a small child lacks the strength to stop a disobedient pony from reaching for grass while being ridden.

Side reins are auxiliary reins used in training and longeing, but not for driving. The reins run from the bit to a surcingle, girth, or riding saddle. They are used to modify head carriage or encourage a young horse to have contact with a bit. Some saddle seat breeds use an overcheck with side reins as part of a bitting rig to teach the horse the proper high head position for competition.

Other types of training equipment that pass over the horse's head include the chambon, and the Gogue, though these are used to lower the head, not raise it.
