= Overdraw =

Overdraw may refer to:

- overdraft, to draw more money than there is in a bank account
- overdrafting, the term in hydrology
- overdraw (dominoes), to draw more than the allowed number of tiles in dominoes
- overblowing, to overdraw in harmonica playing
- fillrate, to overdraw in computer graphics
- a style of bearing rein, a part of horse harness
