= Harness saddle =

Part of a horse-drawn harness

Modern sport-harness saddle

A harness saddle is an element of horse harness which supports the weight of shafts attaching a vehicle to a horse. Like other types of saddle, it lies on the horse's back directly behind the withers, often has an internal supportive framework (referred to as a saddle tree), and usually is secured on either side by a girth passing beneath the horse. Unlike riding saddles, it is an integral part of the harness and is not used as stand-alone equipment.

== Description ==
The harness saddle is the central piece of a harness and has attachment points for numerous other pieces. The saddle supports the weight of the shafts. In a two-wheeled vehicle such as a cart, the saddle supports part of the vehicle's weight because the shafts rest on it to keep the cart level.

The saddle has a supportive internal structure called a saddle tree.. The tree is traditionally made from a steel or iron plate, however contemporary harnesses sometimes have trees made of flexible plastic. The heavier the shafts are on the horse's back, the wider the saddle must be, to distribute the weight over a larger portion of the horse's back. Draft horses pulling heavy utility carts have very large square saddles, well padded against the horse's back, and a groove in which sits a chain that is hooked to the shafts. A carriage harness has a saddle three to six inches wide, and has leather loops (called tugs) that hold the shafts. A saddle pad may be placed beneath the harness saddle, also called a "housing" or "saddle cloth".

The saddle is held in position by a girth strapped firmly around the barrel of the horse. The saddle is a base for fittings including: terrets through which the reins are run; sometimes a hook at the top center for attaching a bearing rein; and a ring at the top center rear for the backstrap leading to the crupper.

Harness saddles

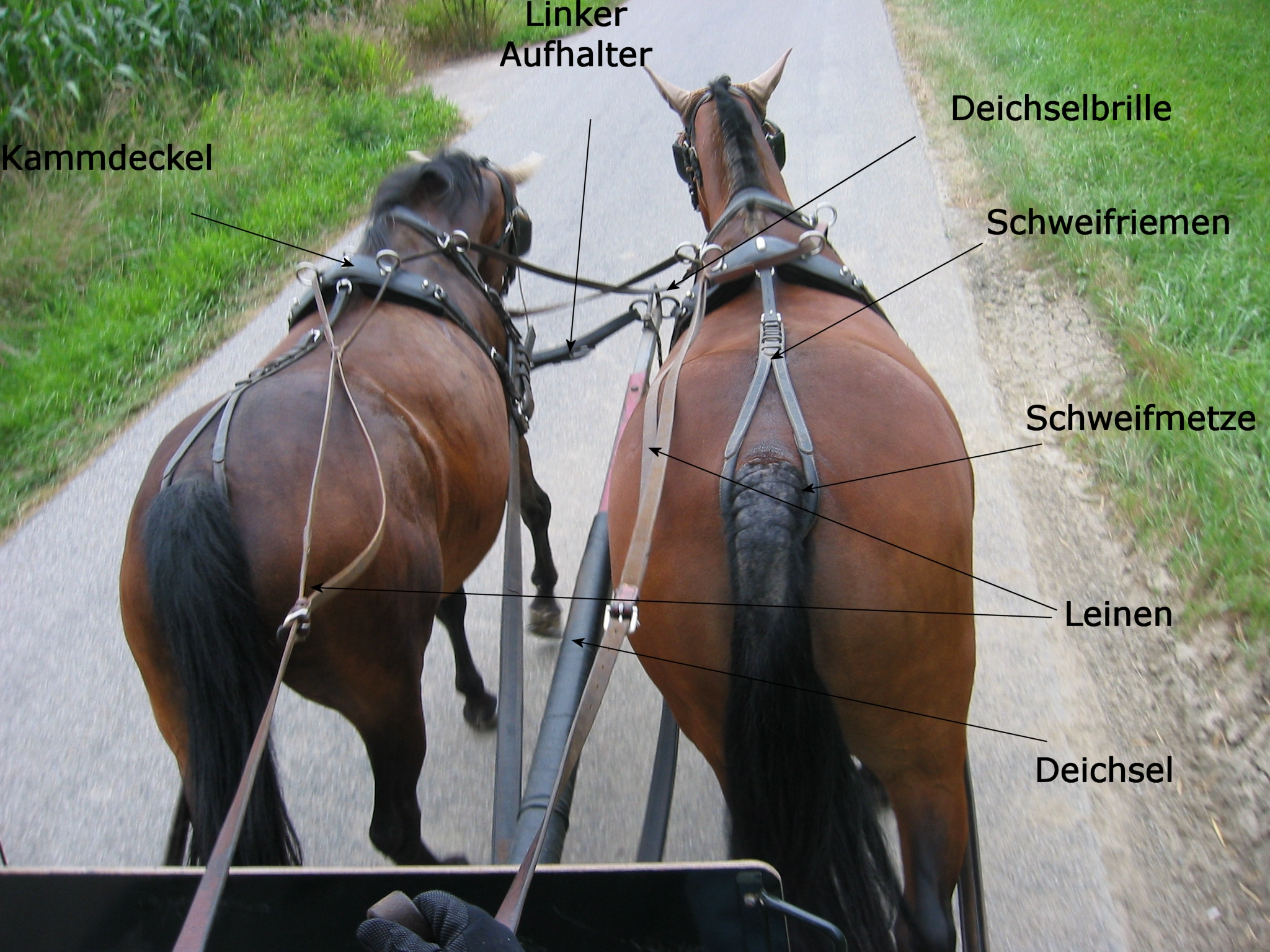
Shows rein terrets and other attachments

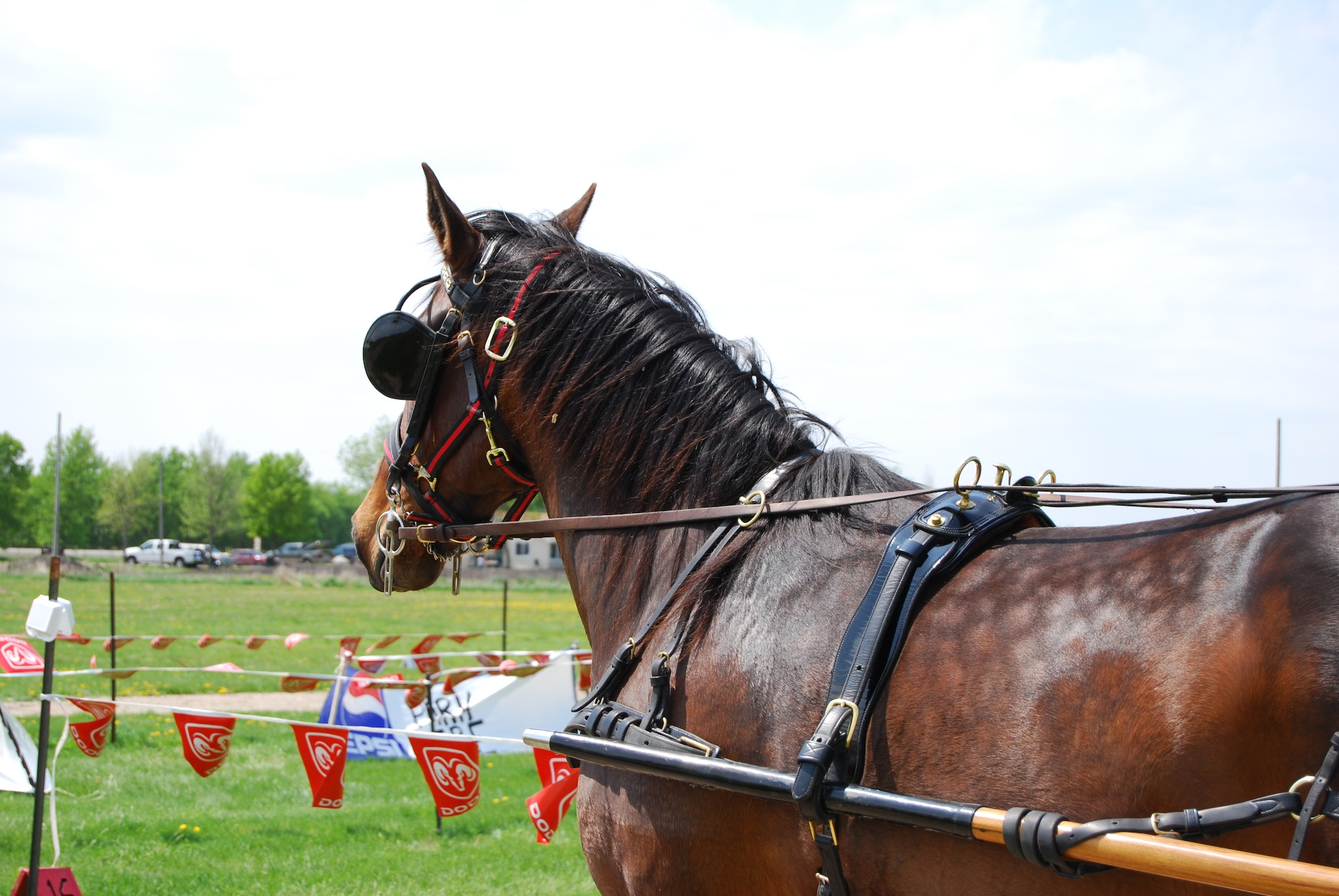
Carriage saddle showing shaft tugs and terrets

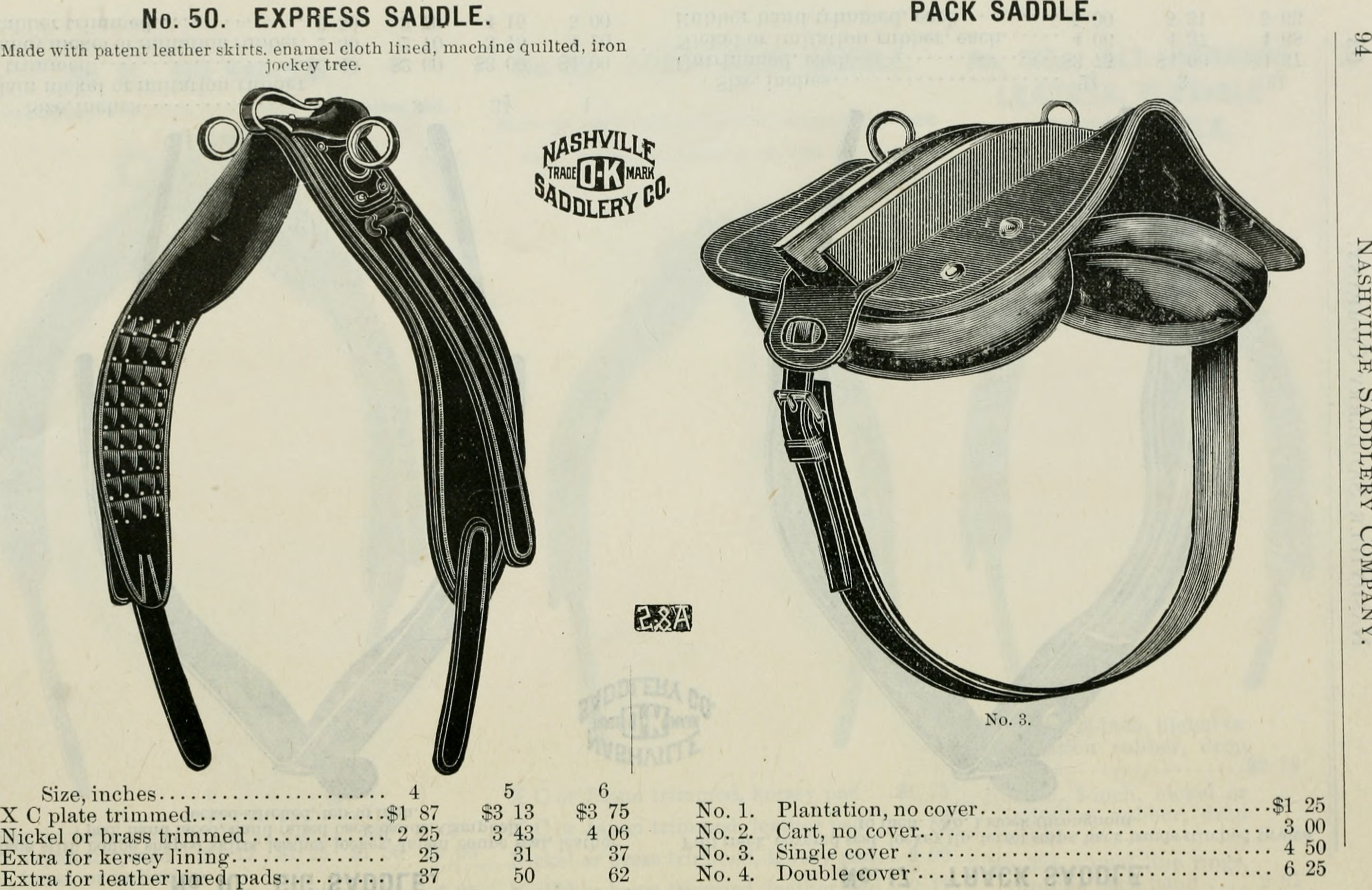
Carriage harness saddle (left); heavy-cart saddle (right)

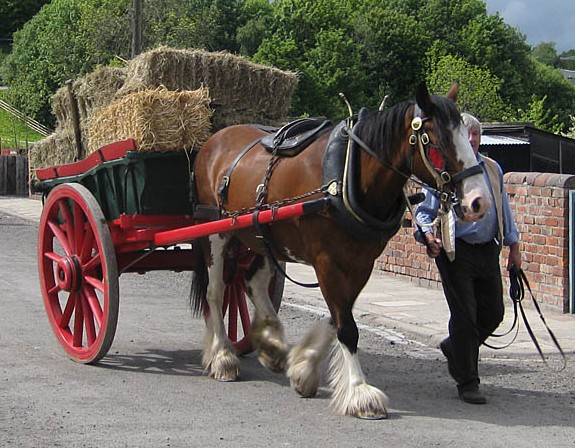
Large carting saddle with chains and chain groove visible

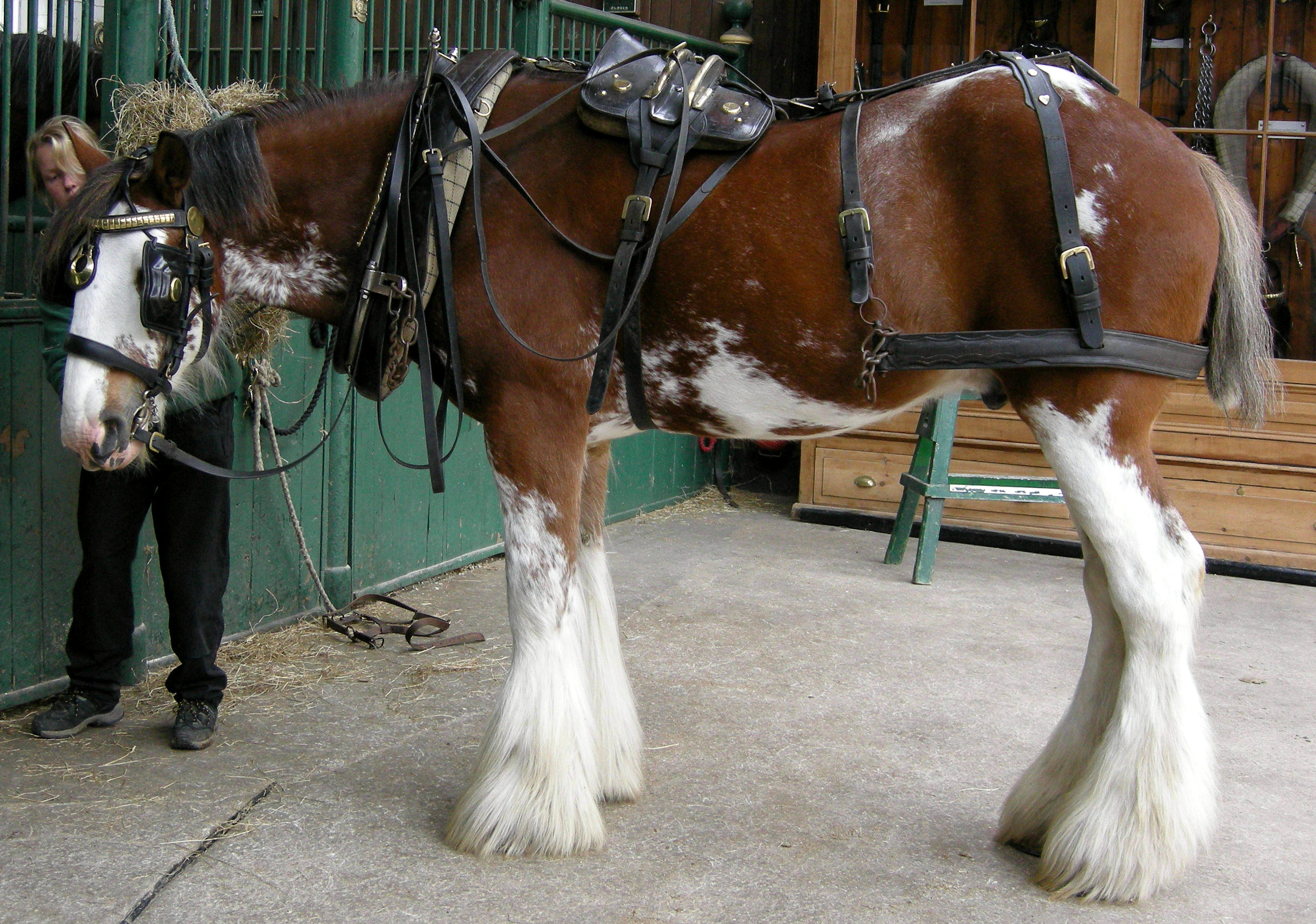
Draft horse harness showing heavy saddle

== History ==
Harness saddles developed alongside improvements in breastplate-and-breeching harnesses, becoming standard in Europe and Asia as vehicles with shafts became common.

== See also ==
- Horse harness
- Shaft bow
