= Bitting rig =

Horse training tool

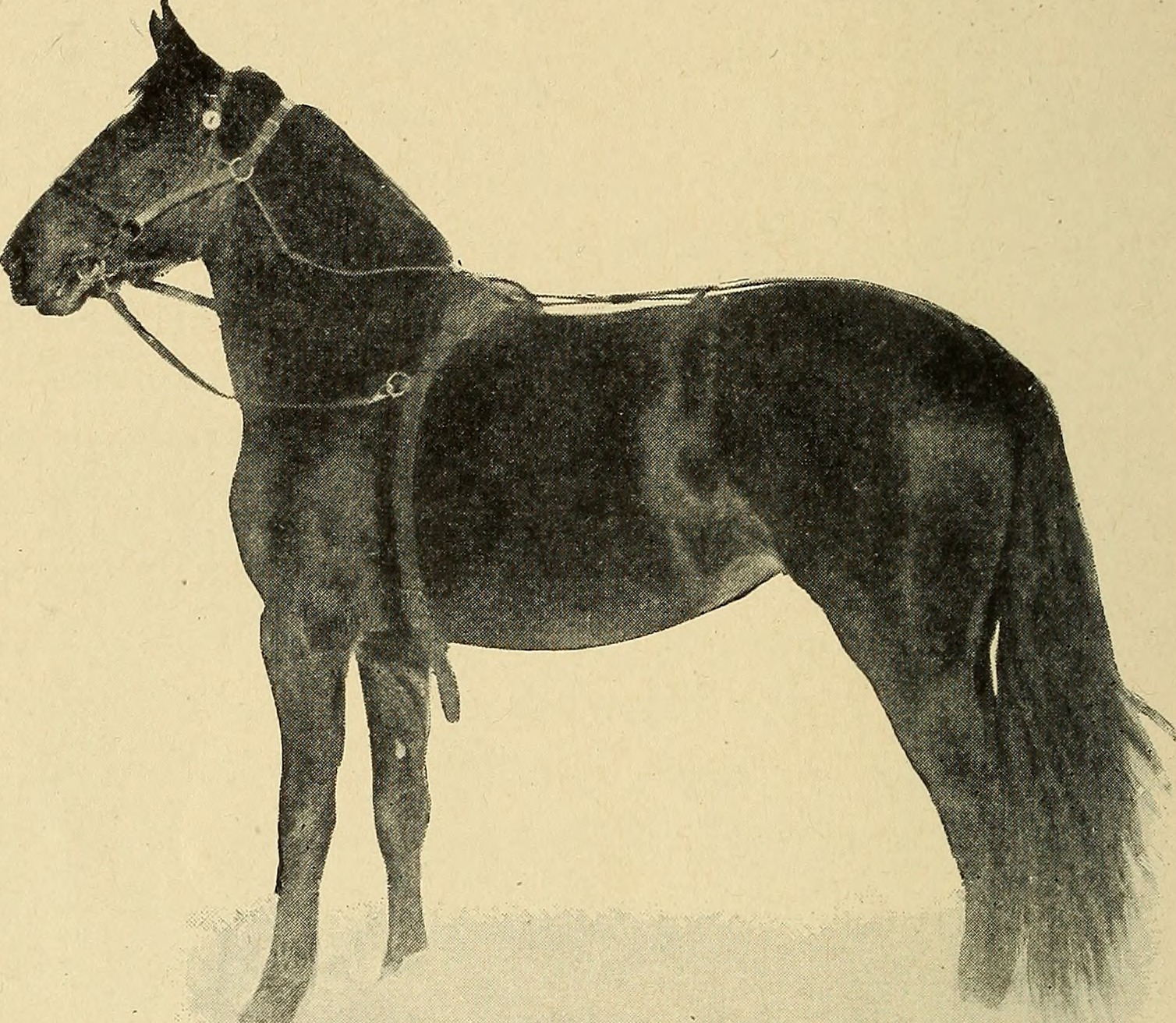
A bitting rig for training

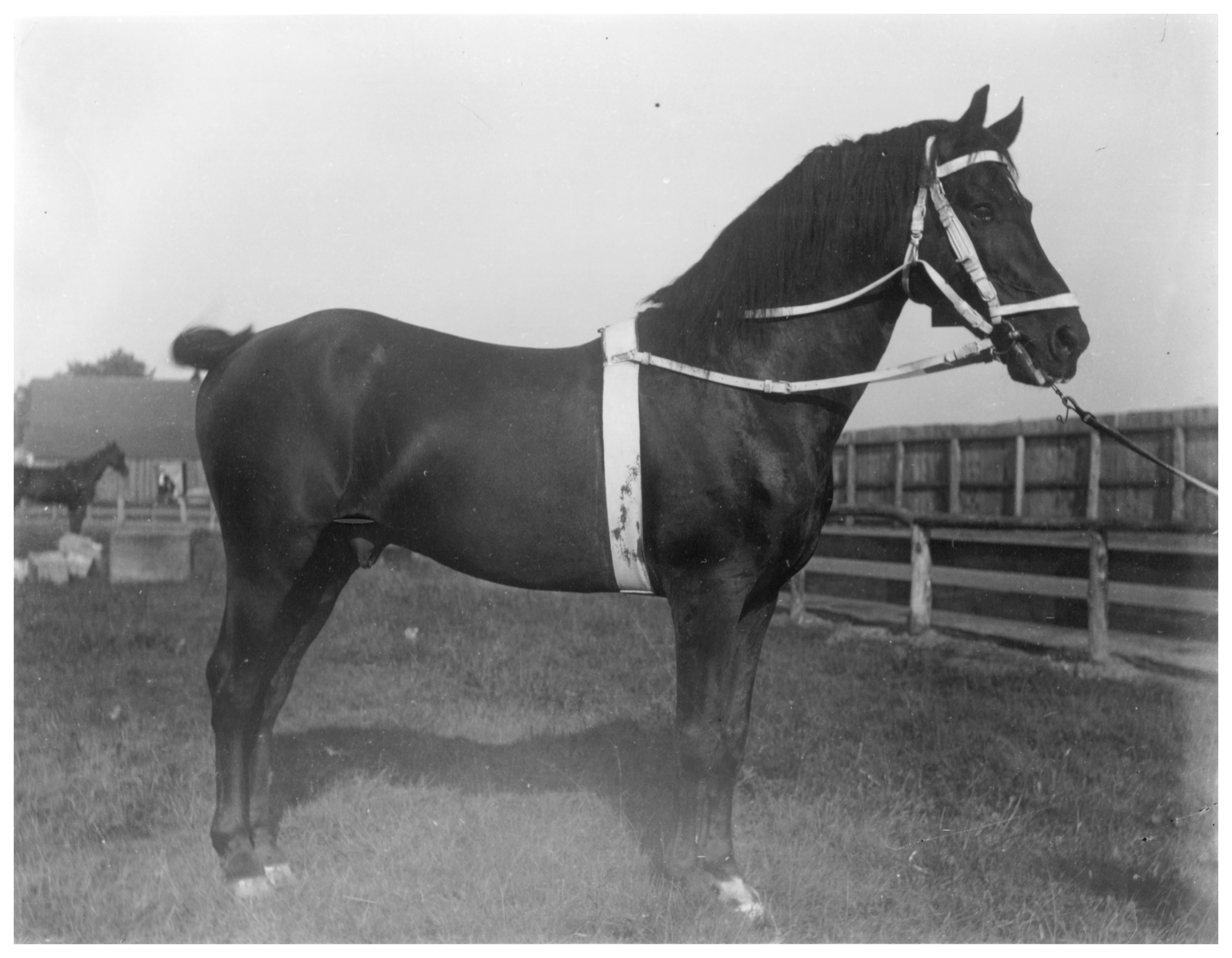
A bitting rig

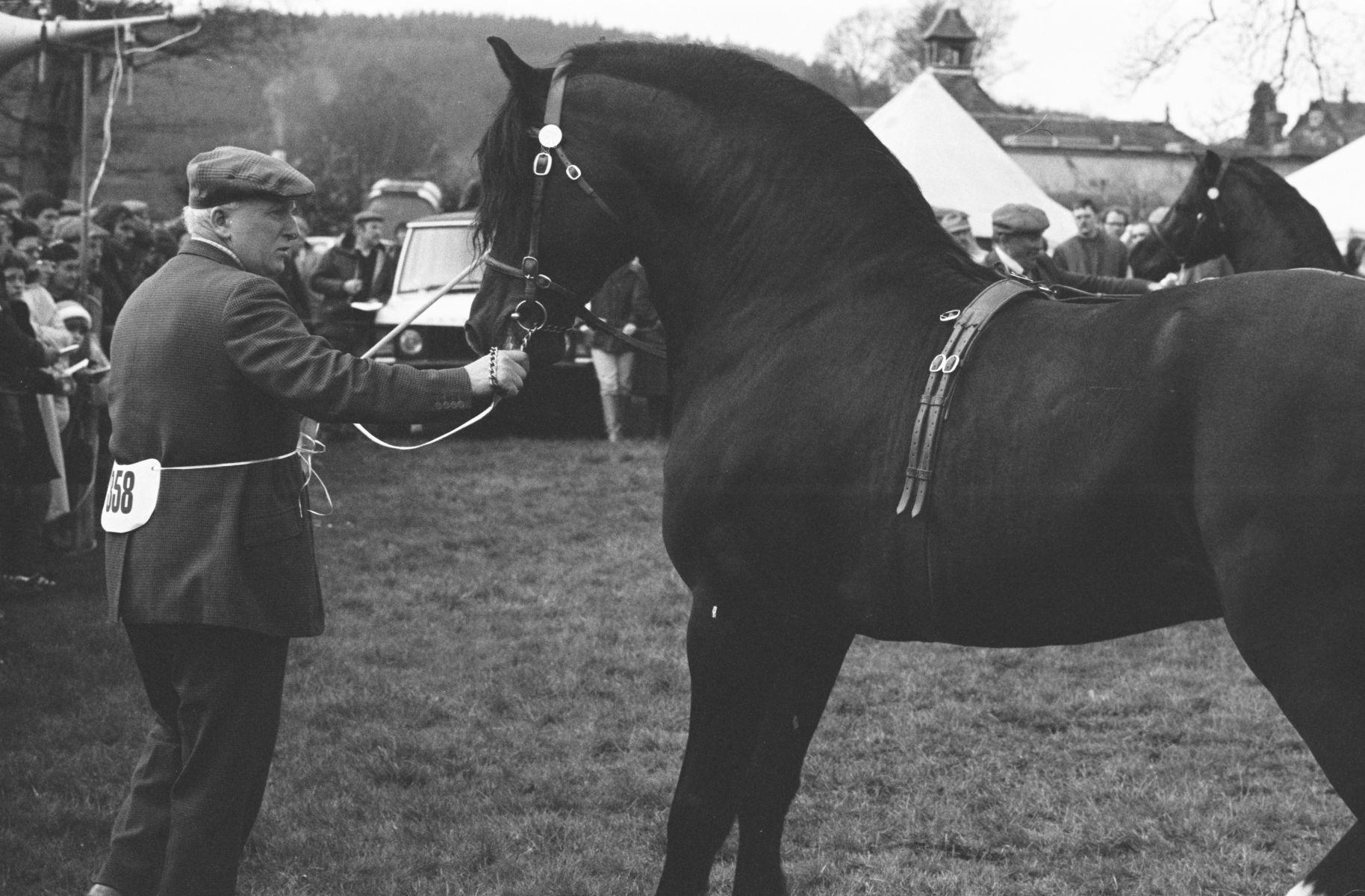
1983 horse show with stallion in bitting rig with the left side rein disconnected

A bitting rig or bitting harness is horse tack used to train a horse to accept the bit or achieve a particular head carriage. It is also used with in-hand showing. Generally used in conjunction with training on a longe line, it is often seen in the training of saddle seat horses, but also is used by some dressage trainers and as a tool to start horses in driving.

A basic bitting rig consists of a surcingle (also known as a roller) that has a number of rings on either side, placed at varying heights, usually with a crupper to prevent the surcingle from being pulled forward. A bridle is also part of a bitting rig, with side reins and rings or small pulleys on either side of the browband to accommodate a bearing rein. Some variations use pulleys and leverage on side reins to create a given "headset." Other designs add straps resembling breeching on the hindquarters to encourage engagement of the horse's rear end.

The use of only a surcingle and side reins, a common component in basic horse training across all equestrian disciplines, is not usually considered a "bitting rig." It is the use of additional reins such as the overcheck, or the use of leverage to place the horse's head in a set position that turns a classic surcingle into a bitting rig.

Both a bitting rig and a classic surcingle with side reins are intended only to be used while longeing a horse. They are not to be used on a horse that is standing in a stall (though this is a very common type of misuse), nor are they used while riding. However, the surcingle and side reins are used as safety tools in the sport of equestrian vaulting.

While a surcingle and side reins are considered classical training tools, the use of the full bitting rig is controversial in some circles. The basic debate is whether the use of the check reins or any other rein setup other than the classic side rein is unnatural and develops incorrect musculature in the neck, back, and hindquarters. Like any tool, a bitting rig can be overused, leading to soreness and fatigue in the horse, and in some cases, improper use may teach a horse to lean on the bit and develop a hard mouth rather than relaxing and giving to it. Misuse can also lead to a horse that holds its head in a set position, but fails to properly engage the hindquarters and learn proper collection. Proponents argue that it safely teaches a horse a correct head position and gently accustoms a horse to what will be expected of it when carrying a rider.

== See also ==
- Longeing
- Side reins
- Bearing rein
