= Terret =

Rings on horse harness to guide reins

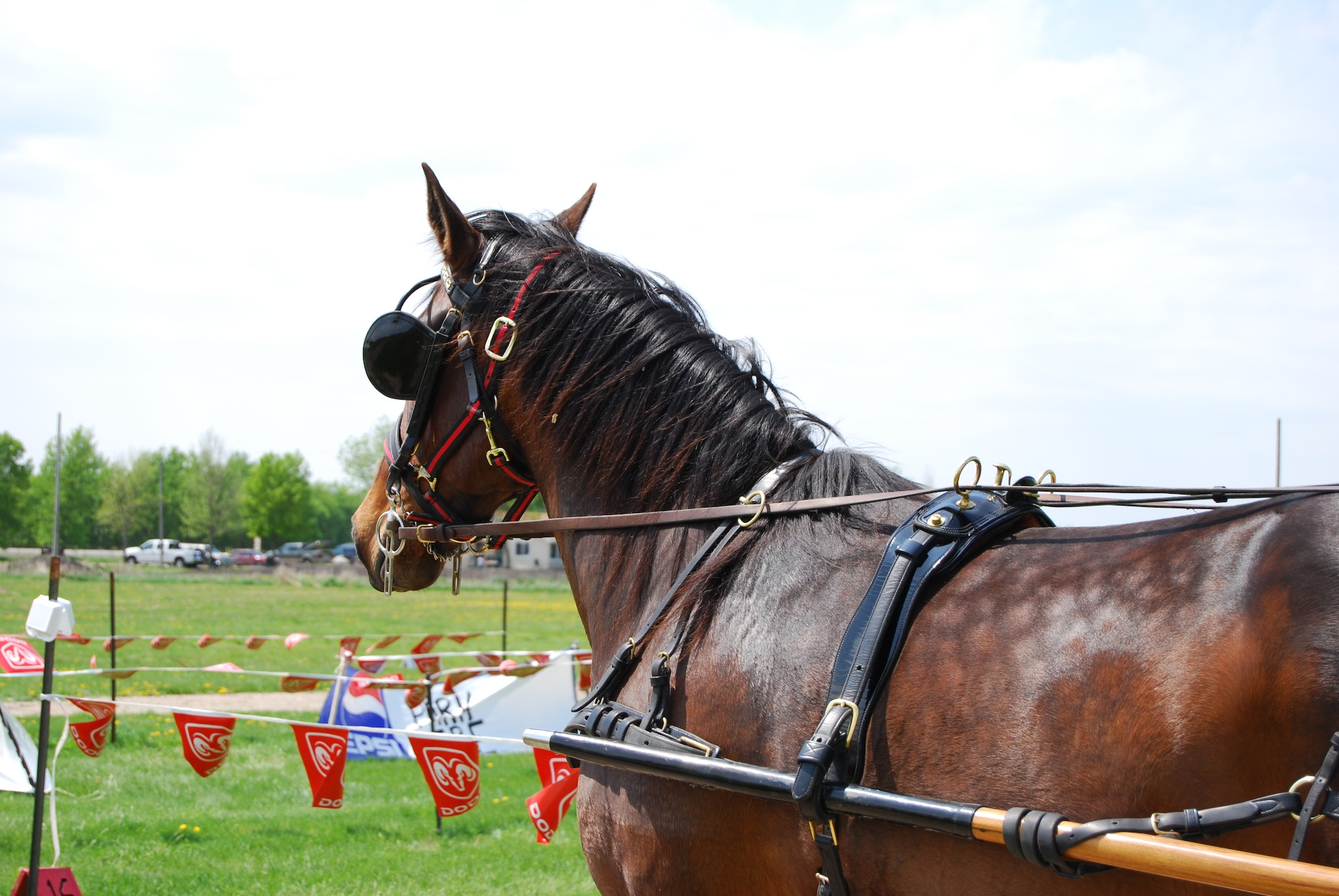
Pair of terrets on the harness saddle, and another pair on the neck-strap

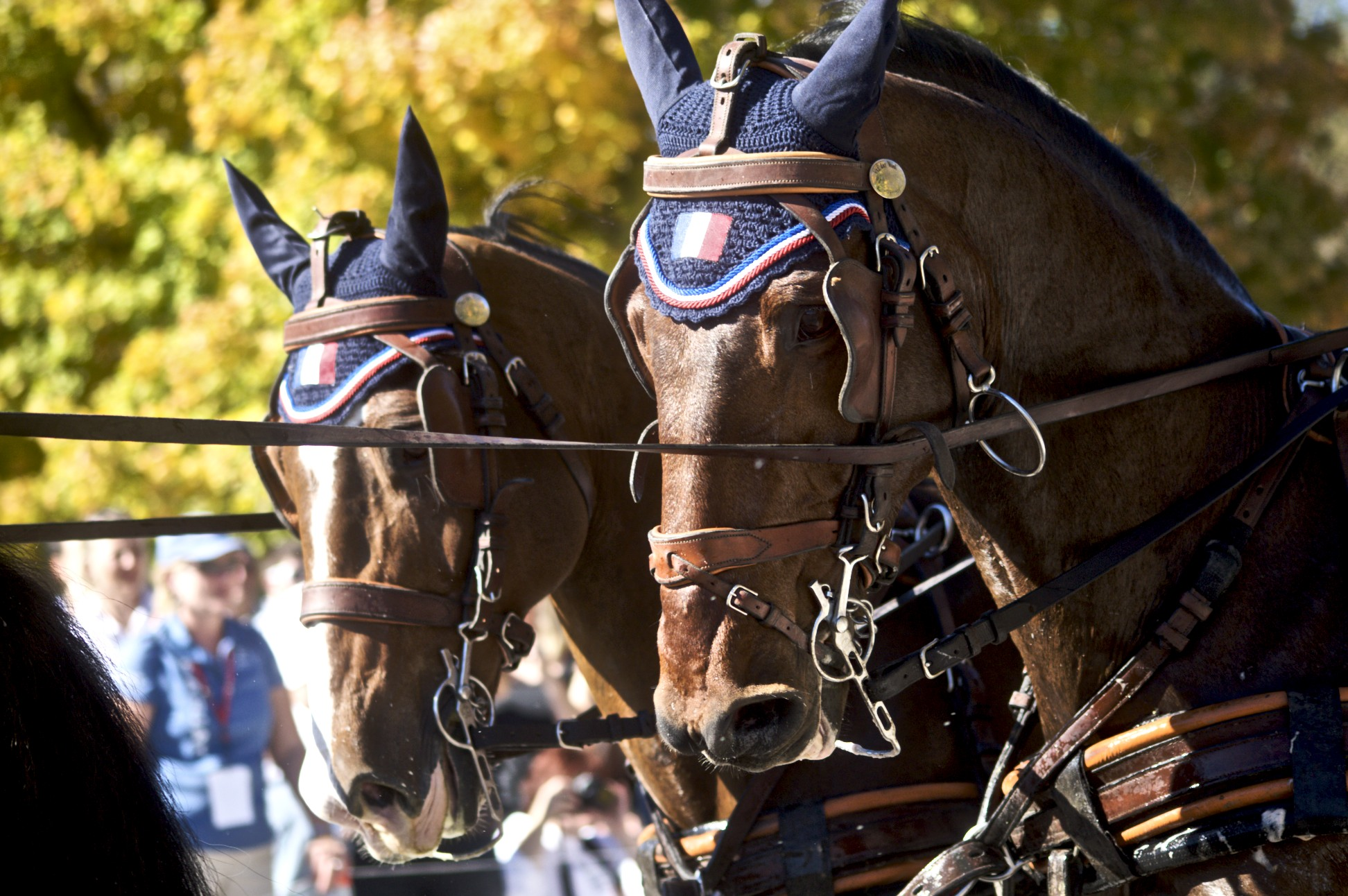
Roger rings on the outside of the bridles of these rear horses in a four-in-hand team

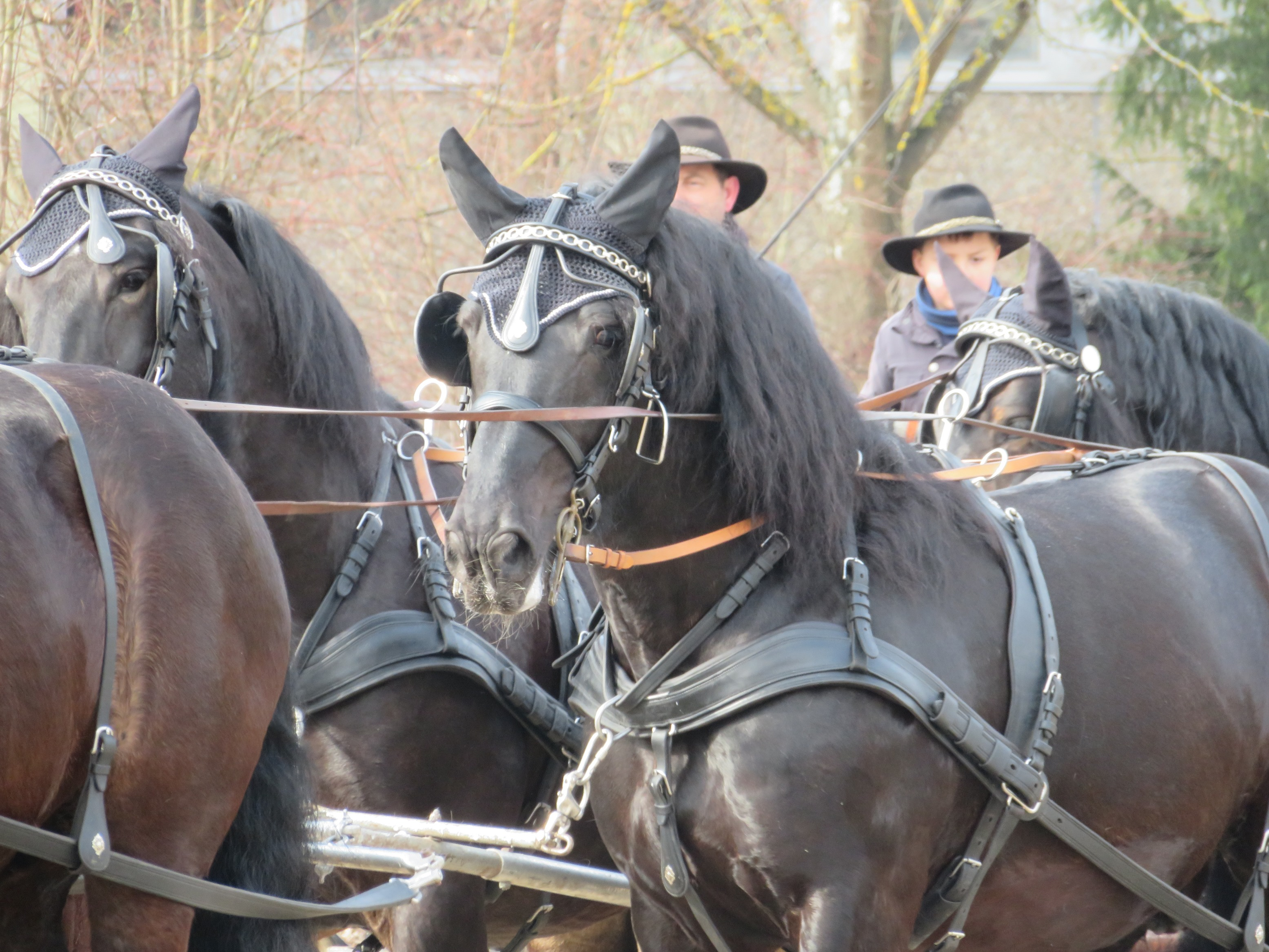
The reins going to an individual horse's bit pass through terrets on the saddle and neck-strap. But reins going to horses ahead, pass through rings high on the bridle of the horses behind them.

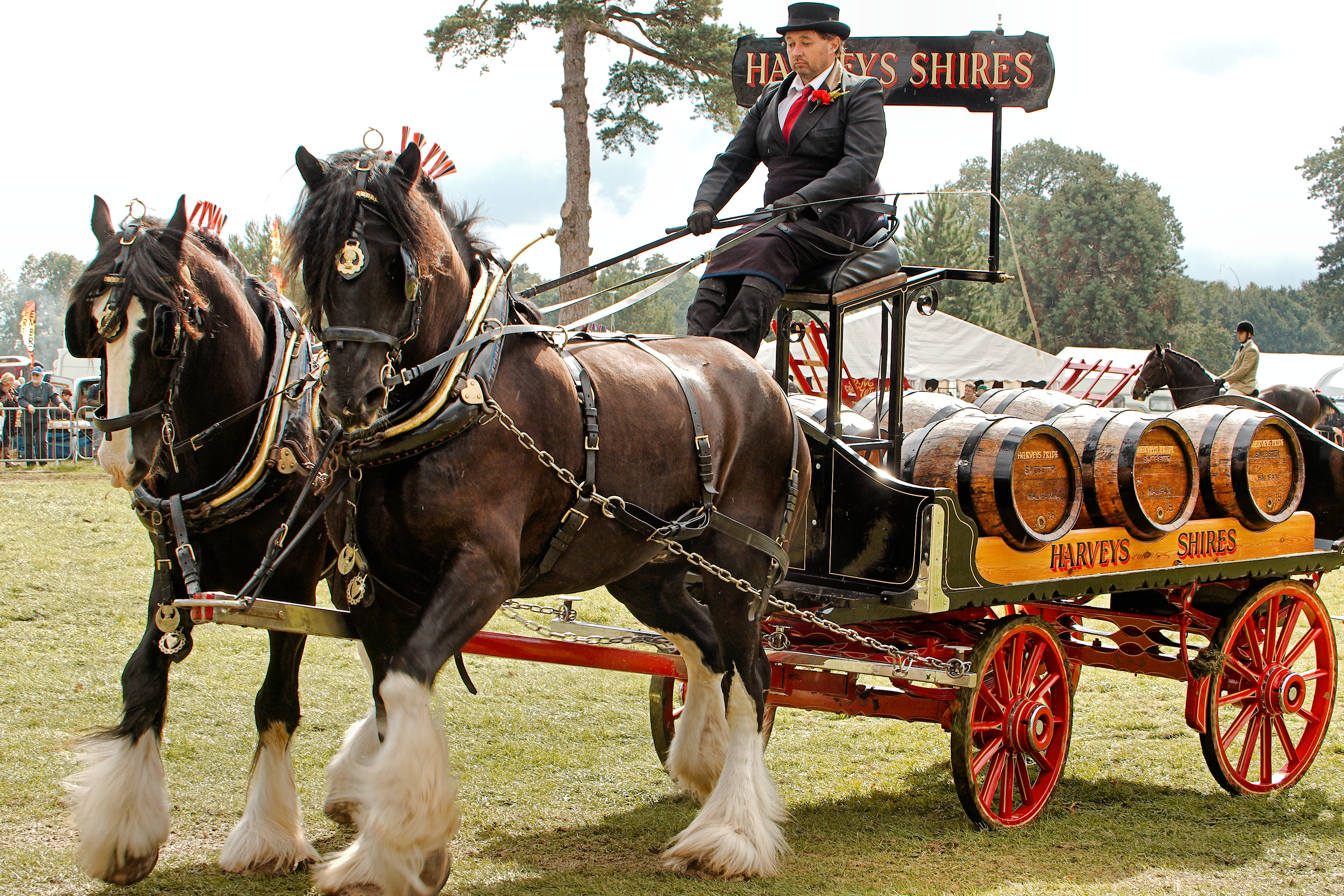
Fly terrets on the crown of the bridle

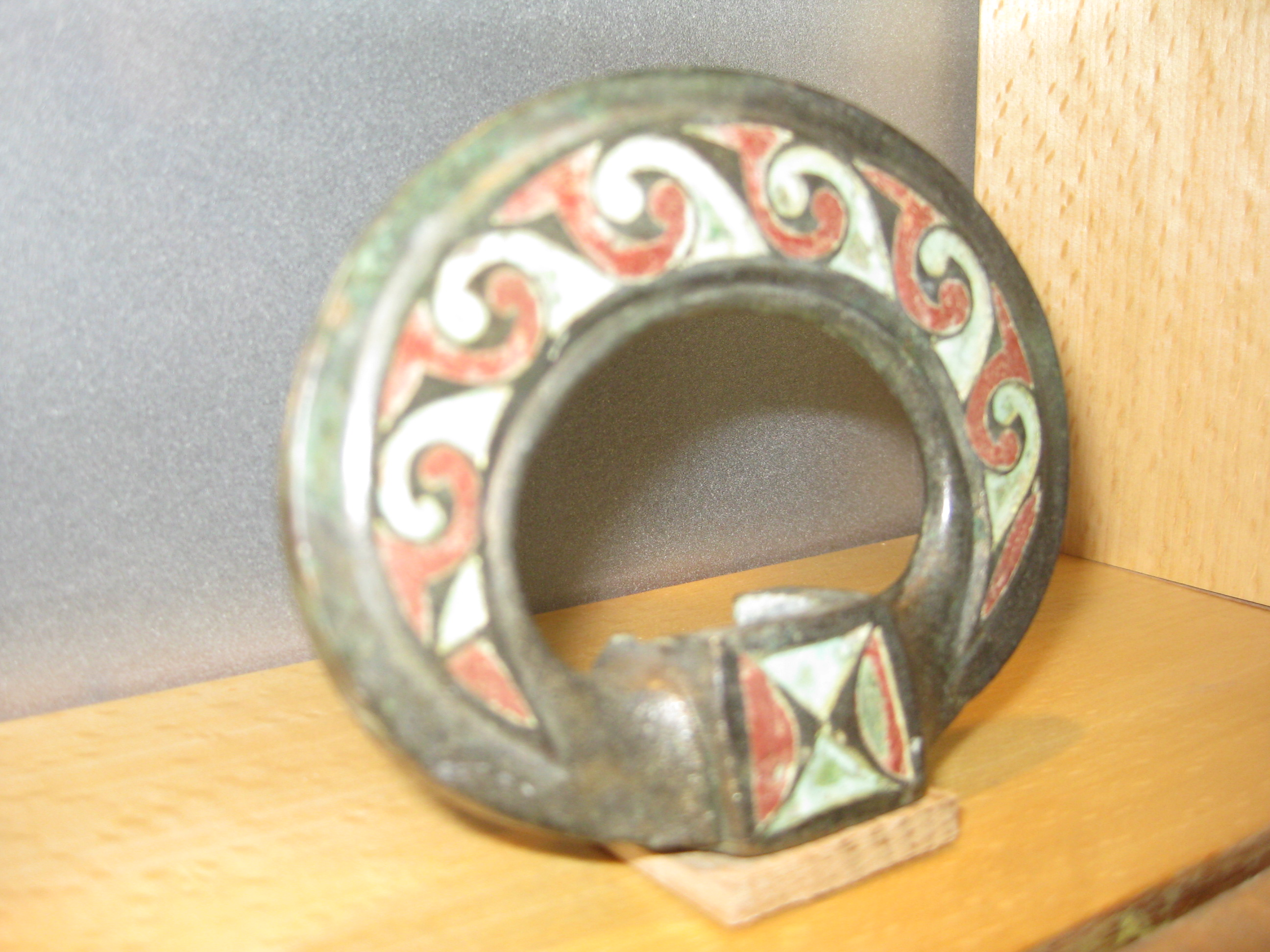
Romano-British enamelled bronze harness terret, made in 1st-century Britain, found in France

A terret or rein ring is a metal loop on a horse harness through which the lines (reins) pass to prevent them from tangling or getting snagged on the harness or shafts.

The lines run from the hands of the driver, through the terrets, and then attach to the horse's bit to guide the horse. Most harnesses have two pairs of terrets, one on the harness saddle, and one on the hames of the collar (or on the neck-strap of a breast collar). Terrets are commonly made of brass or steel, and they may stand up stiffly, or they may consist of a hinged ring. They are usually circular, but may be U-shaped or square.

Where a horse is driven behind another (such as in a team of four or more, or in tandem), each terret on the rear animal's harness may be divided into two, allowing the lines for the forward and rear animals to be kept separate. There may also be an additional pair of head terrets on the rear animal's bridle, taking the reins for the forward animal, also called a "Roger ring".

The word terret may also be used for other metal loops for attaching ropes or chains, such as the ring on a dog collar. The word derives from the Old French toret or touret, meaning small and round. Because the terret was often decorated and has the same mounts as harness bells and plumes, sometimes in combination, the word often extends to include these even when the guideline function for the reins is itself missing. The purpose of bells, for example, was to give audible warning of the approach of a team, as the weight of a load requiring four or more horses in hand makes rapid stopping very difficult.

Fly terrets were intended to discourage flies from bothering the horses, especially during the summer. While they were somewhat successful in dissuading flies, terrets also assumed a decorative role during the last half of the 19th century. The use of brasses and fly terrets was most popular from 1850 through 1910 when they were mass-produced by either stamping or casting.

Bronze terrets from horse harness are a common archaeological find from the European Iron Age, sometimes with decoration.

== See also ==
- Horse harness
