= Crupper =

Strap under horse tail

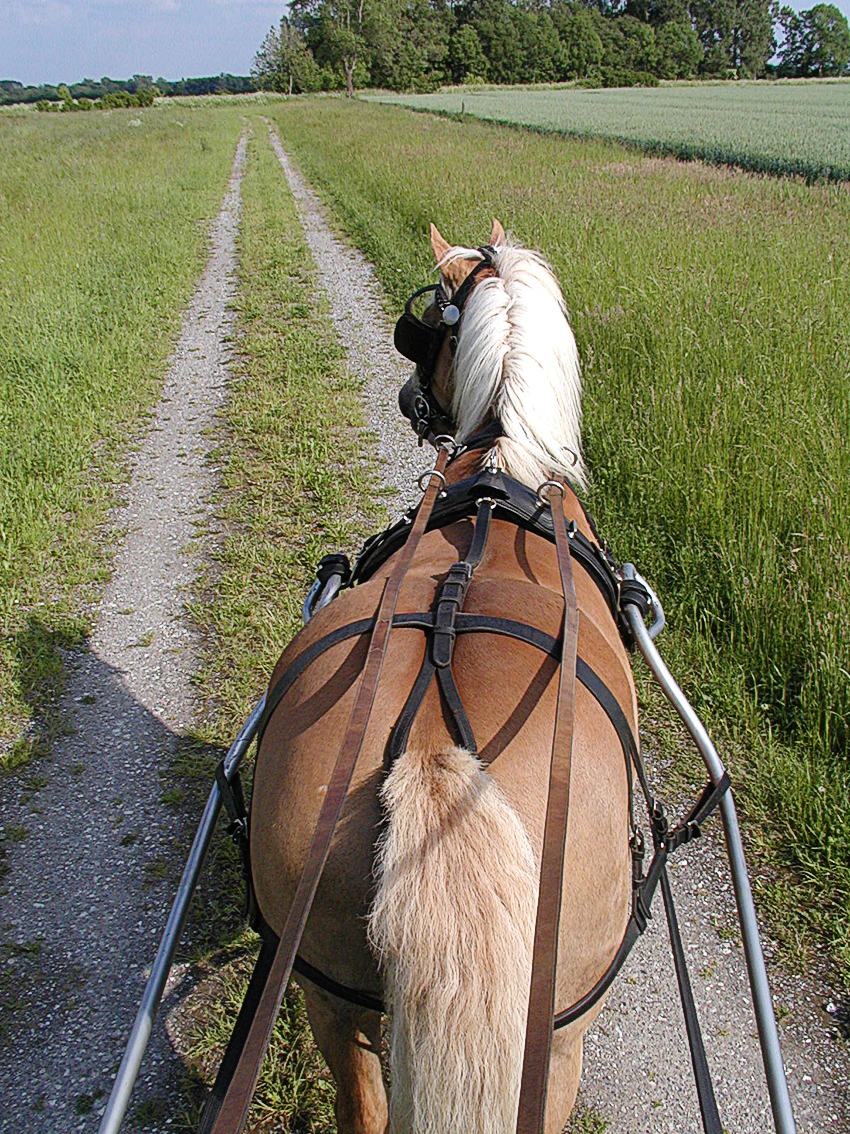
Crupper goes under the top of the tail and helps to stabilize harness

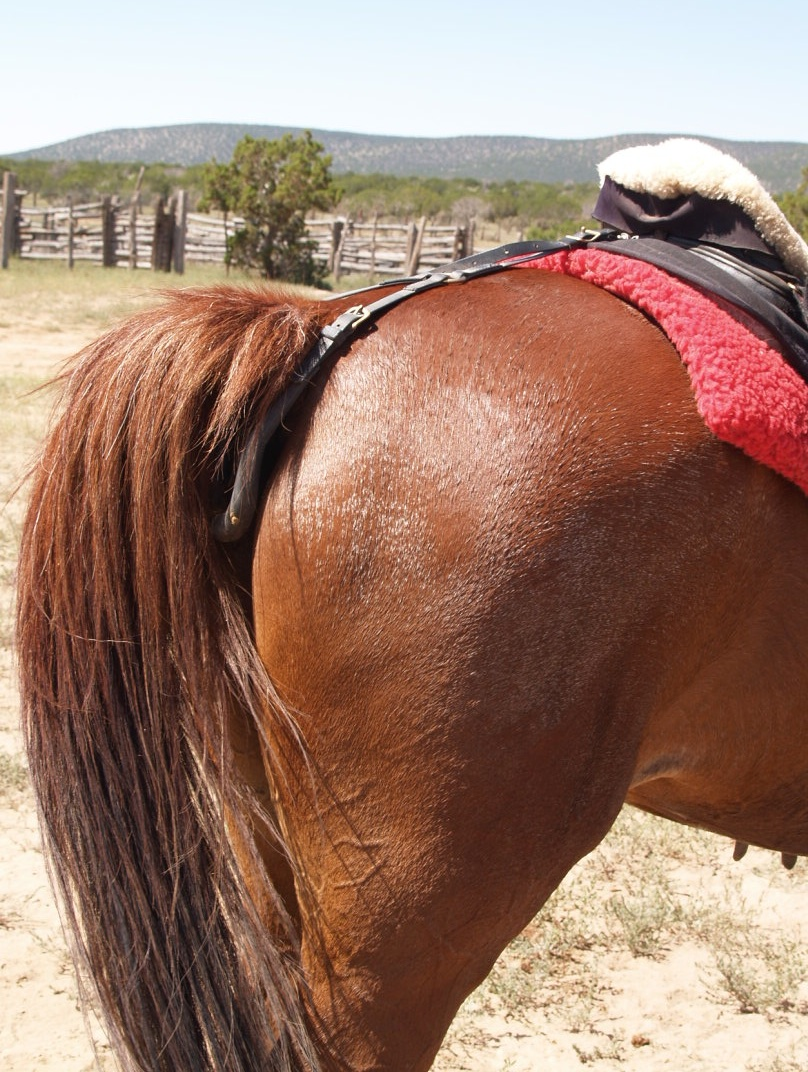
Crupper attached to the back of a saddle

A crupper (/ˈkrʌpər/; occ. spelled crouper) is a piece of tack used on horses and other equids to keep a saddle, harness or other equipment from sliding forward.

== Construction ==
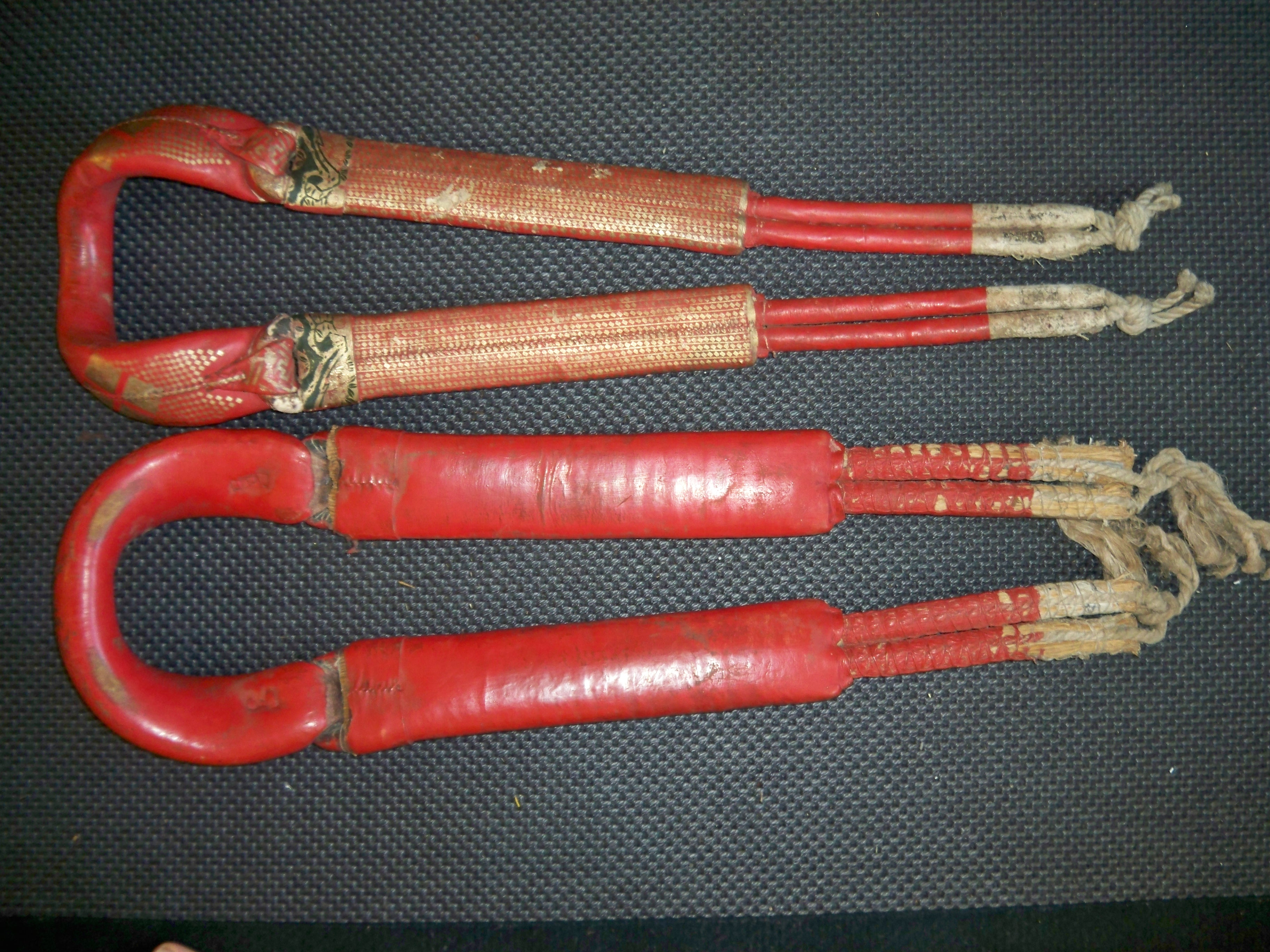
Antique Japanese cruppers designed for saddles

The crupper consists of a loop (the crupper itself) and an adjustable strap (crupper strap or back strap) that connects the crupper to back of a riding saddle or the other parts of a harness. The strap runs from the horse's dock, over the croup, to the saddle or to the back band (sometimes called the saddle) of a harness.

Usually made of leather, the crupper loop is stuffed, traditionally with linseed to keep it supple in use, and molded into a tube that is shaped into a loop. The crupper may be sewn to its strap, or attached to the strap by one or two buckles. If the crupper has no buckle, then the skirt of the horse's tail is folded up onto the tailbone and the tailbone is slipped through the crupper. If it has buckles, the crupper is unbuckled and passed under the dock.

== Use and safety ==
A crupper is used to keep the equipment placed on a horse's back from slipping forward. Cruppers are seen most often on horse harnesses. They are also used on the surcingles of bitting rigs, riding saddles, and, occasionally, pack saddles.

A crupper needs to be snug enough to keep the saddle or harness in place, but not so tight that the horse is irritated or the skin of the tail is damaged. Cruppers are adjusted to engage only when needed; pressure is not meant to be constantly applied. If a crupper is too tight, it can cause severe chafing, discomfort and sores. If it is too loose, the saddle or harness may not stay in the proper position. If used in an improper manner for too long a period of time, the horse may even become disabled in the hindquarters. The loop of a crupper is kept very clean.

=== Driving ===
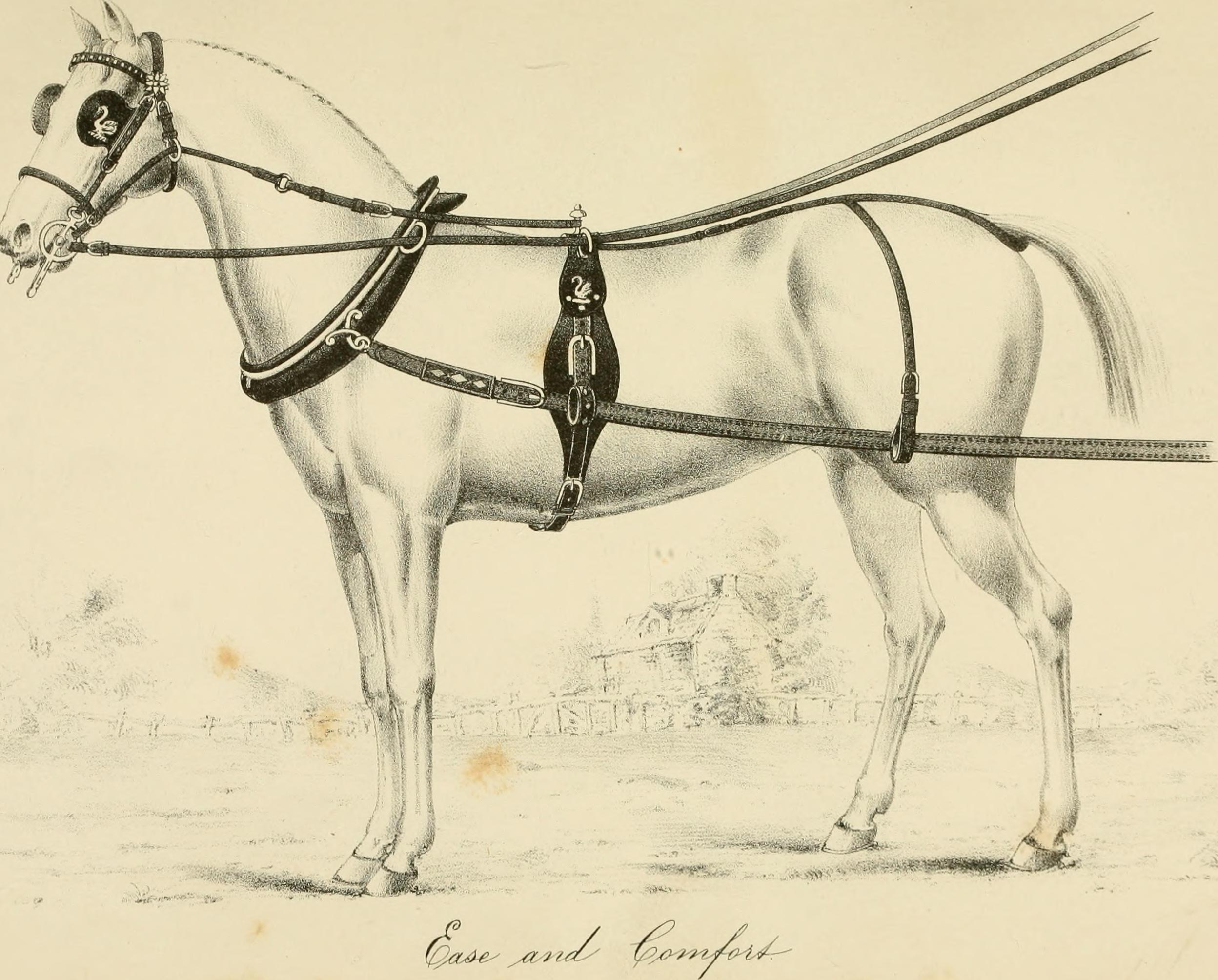
The crupper goes directly under the tailhead

For driving, a crupper is used to prevent the parts of a harness that fit around the barrel of the horse (the girth, bellyband, back band and saddle) from slipping forward. The crupper is adjusted to allow about an inch of play between the crupper and the dock. Some harnesses with breeching use this as an anchor instead of a crupper.

=== Riding ===
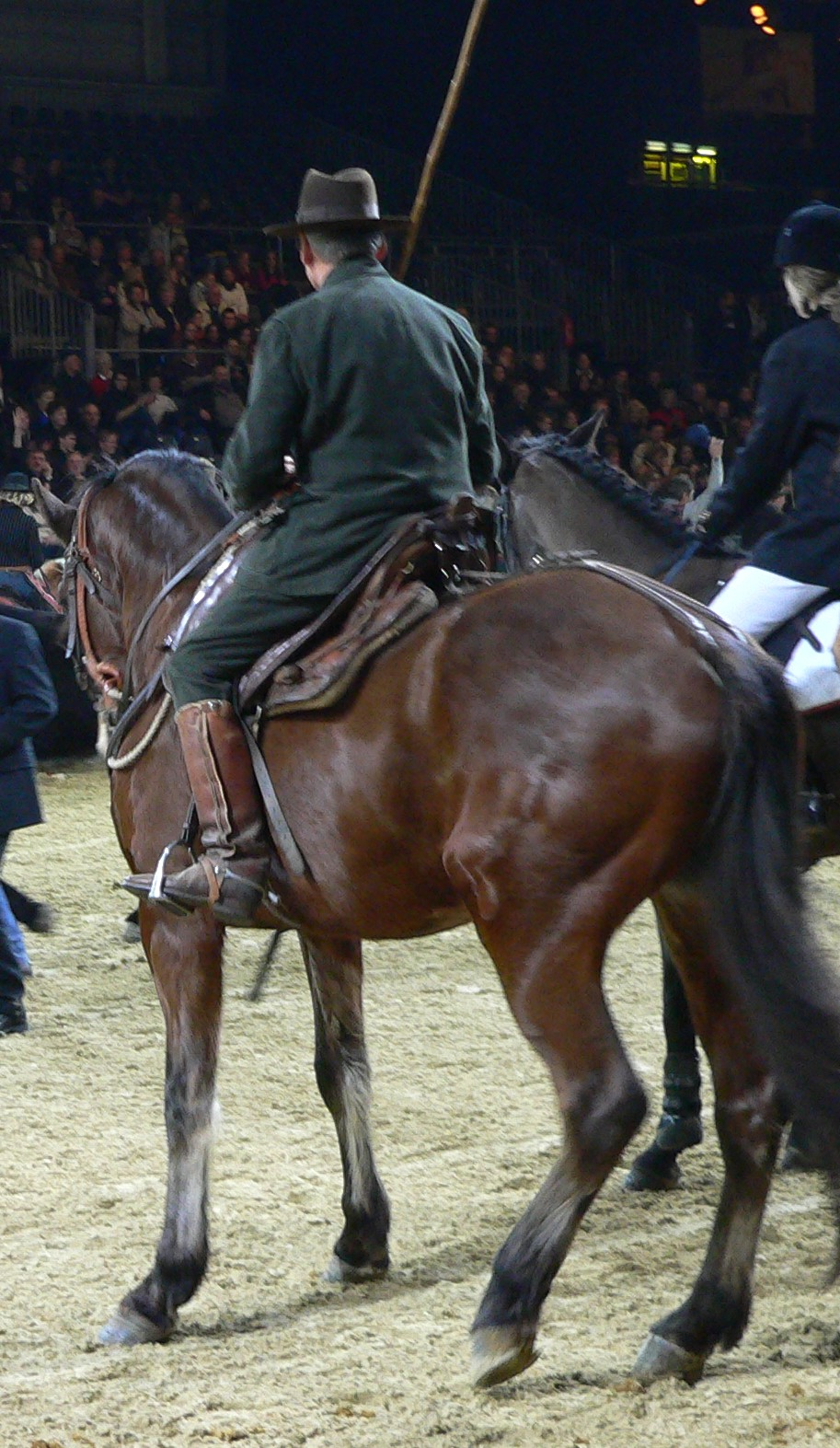
Traditional attire and tack of a buttero, utilizing a crupper.

A crupper is used on riding saddles when riding a horse or mule with low withers in steep terrain. Cruppers are most often used in activities such as endurance riding, mounted orienteering, competitive trail riding, and for recreational trail riding in mountains.

When riding, cruppers are particularly useful on animals with low withers, because this conformation allows the saddle to slip forward as the animal travels downhill. Though not a substitute for a correctly fitted saddle, they are often used on mules, as many saddles, particularly those made for horses, are more likely to slide forward on a flatter-backed mule.

The crupper strap may be single or double (forked). It usually attaches via a snap or buckle to a crupper ring at the center of the cantle of the saddle, or to a pair of rings (dees) on either side of the cantle. Many riding saddles today are manufactured without properly placed rings, though rings can be added. Or, in lieu of rings, a design used on English saddles utilizes a t-shaped brace that is inserted under the saddle between the rear panels and the tree.

Cruppers are not common on western saddles, but some English saddles are designed with crupper rings, particularly those designed to fit mules.

Cruppers are seen on the saddles of some horses used to work cattle with a lance (such as horses of the buttero in Europe), but not on horses used to work cattle with a lasso.

=== Packing ===
On pack horses, saddle breeching alone is quite common. However, sometimes a crupper is used in addition to breeching.

== History ==
A crupper has been a standard part of mule saddles for centuries. In the 1614 spurious Avellaneda Segunda Parte to Don Quixote, a mule crupper is mentioned several times, and it is translated as "crupper" in two 18th-century English translations.

Cruppers were once part of the standard design of cavalry saddles. The McClellan saddle used by the United States Army utilized an optional crupper into the early 20th century, though difficulties with proper fitting eventually led the army to discontinue its use. Cruppers continue to be part of the ceremonial tack for some cavalry regiments and tent pegging teams.

When Di Xin, the last king of the Shang Dynasty, was overthrown by his enemies and forced to commit suicide in 1046 BCE, he was given the humiliating posthumous name Zhòu ([ʈ͡ʂoʊ]; simplified Chinese: 纣; traditional Chinese: 紂), meaning "crupper". This was meant to highlight his tyranny and lack of virtue by associating him with the part of the saddle that would get soiled with feces.
