= Surcingle =

Type of horse saddle

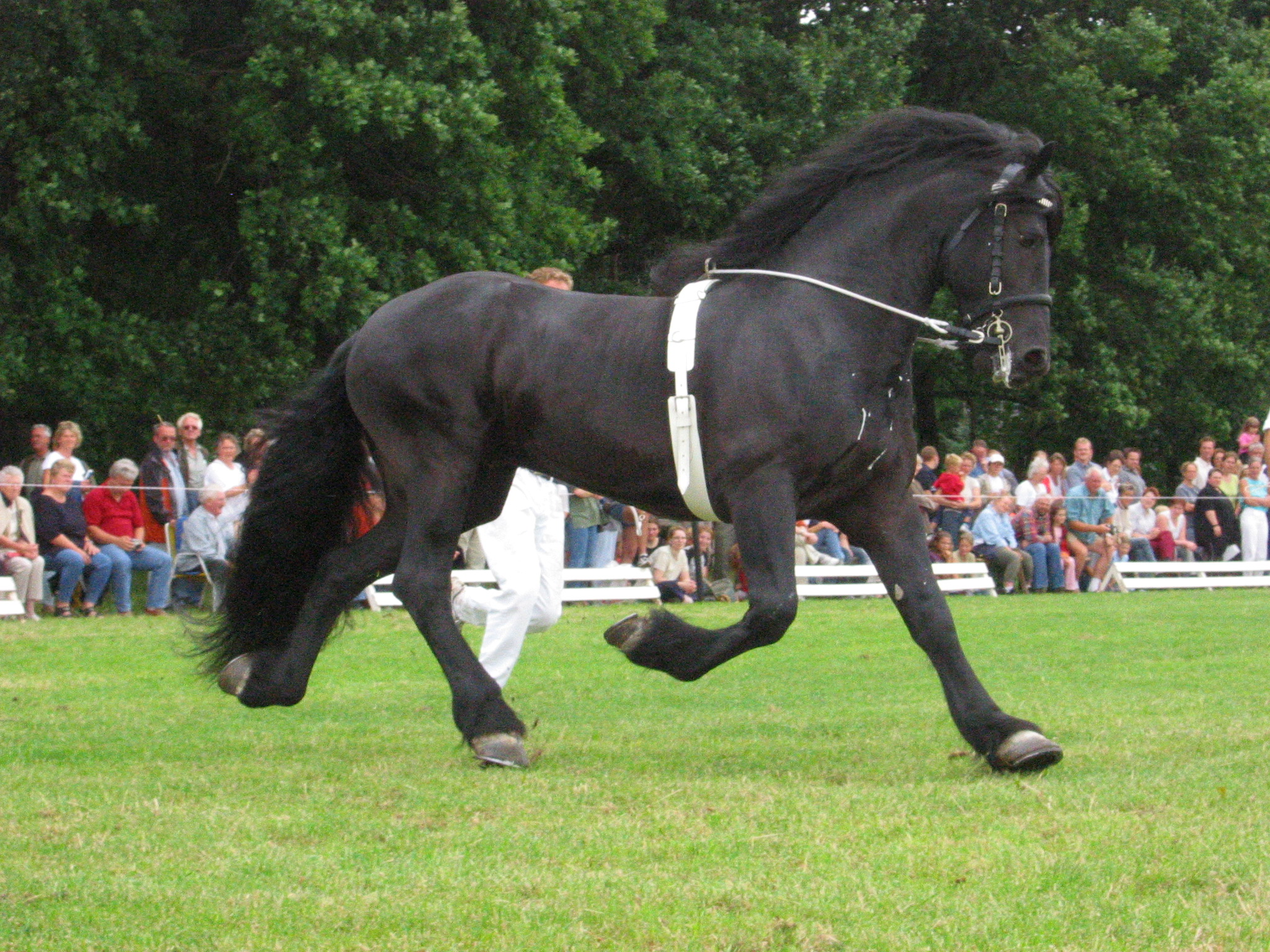
A show Friesian horse wearing a surcingle

A surcingle is a strap made of leather or leather-like synthetic materials such as nylon or neoprene, sometimes with elastic, that fastens around the horse's girth.

A surcingle may be used for ground training, some types of in-hand exhibition, and over a saddle or horse pack to stabilize the rider's weight. It also is a primary component of a horse harness.

A basic surcingle is unpadded, attaches around the horse by means of buckles or rings, and has no other hardware. A training surcingle, sometimes called a "roller", has many extra rings attached, running from the ribcage up to the withers area. It usually has padding to relieve pressure on the horse's spine. A variation of this design is used for equestrian vaulting.

== Uses ==
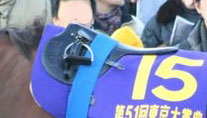
A simple surcingle over a horse racing saddle

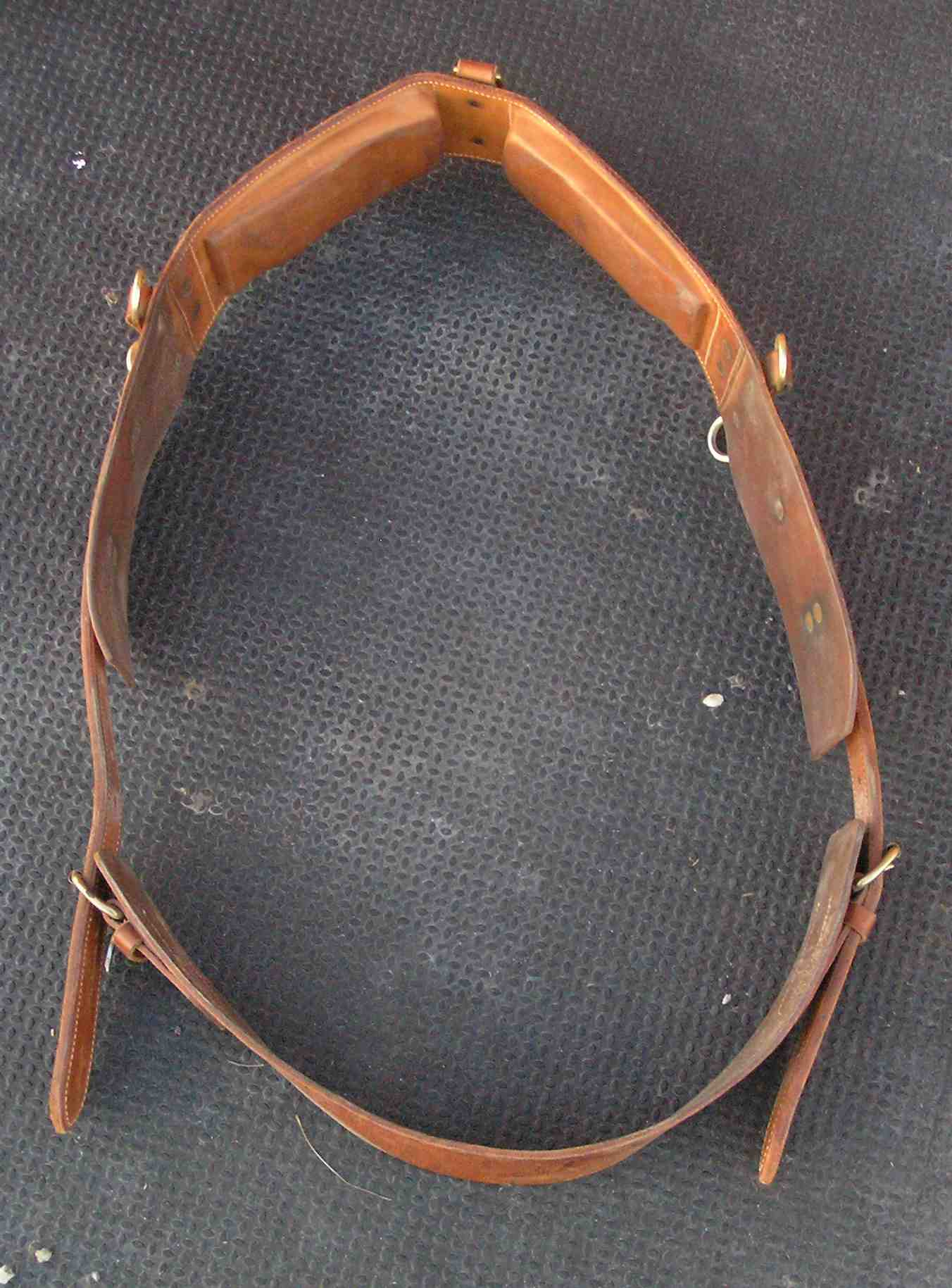
Detail of a training surcingle or "roller"

Many trainers first teach a young horse to accept girth pressure by strapping on a surcingle before a saddle and girth. The surcingle is commonly used for longeing (a horse training technique), often as a base from which to attach training equipment such as side reins, overcheck, lauffer reins (sliding side reins), or chambons (a type of strap). A surcingle is also important in long lining or ground driving, as it provides rings for the long reins to run through. Double longeing, using two longe lines, requires the use of a surcingle to thread the longe lines through the rings.

Compared to a saddle, a surcingle allows more precise adjustment of side reins due to the placement of additional rings. While a saddle only provides one height to attach the rings (the girth buckles), and can be uneven or at the wrong position, a training surcingle places rings at more appropriate locations for ground work. Many surcingle designs allow the side reins to be attached at several different heights along the sides of the horse.

== Placement ==
When used without a saddle, a surcingle sits just behind the withers. When used with a saddle, the surcingle runs over the seat near the pommel. A surcingle is also used over the top of certain types of pack saddle and pack to keep the pack bags and swag in place. A surcingle is usually used with a pad, and fit to the horse's back as carefully as a saddle would be. It is tightened enough to prevent slipping, more when used with a saddle and rider, less when used for ground training.

== See also ==
- Bitting rig
- Horse harness
- Longeing

== Sources ==
- Price, Steven D. (ed.) The Whole Horse Catalog: Revised and Updated New York:Fireside 1998 ISBN 0-684-83995-4
