= Side reins =

Horse riding equipment

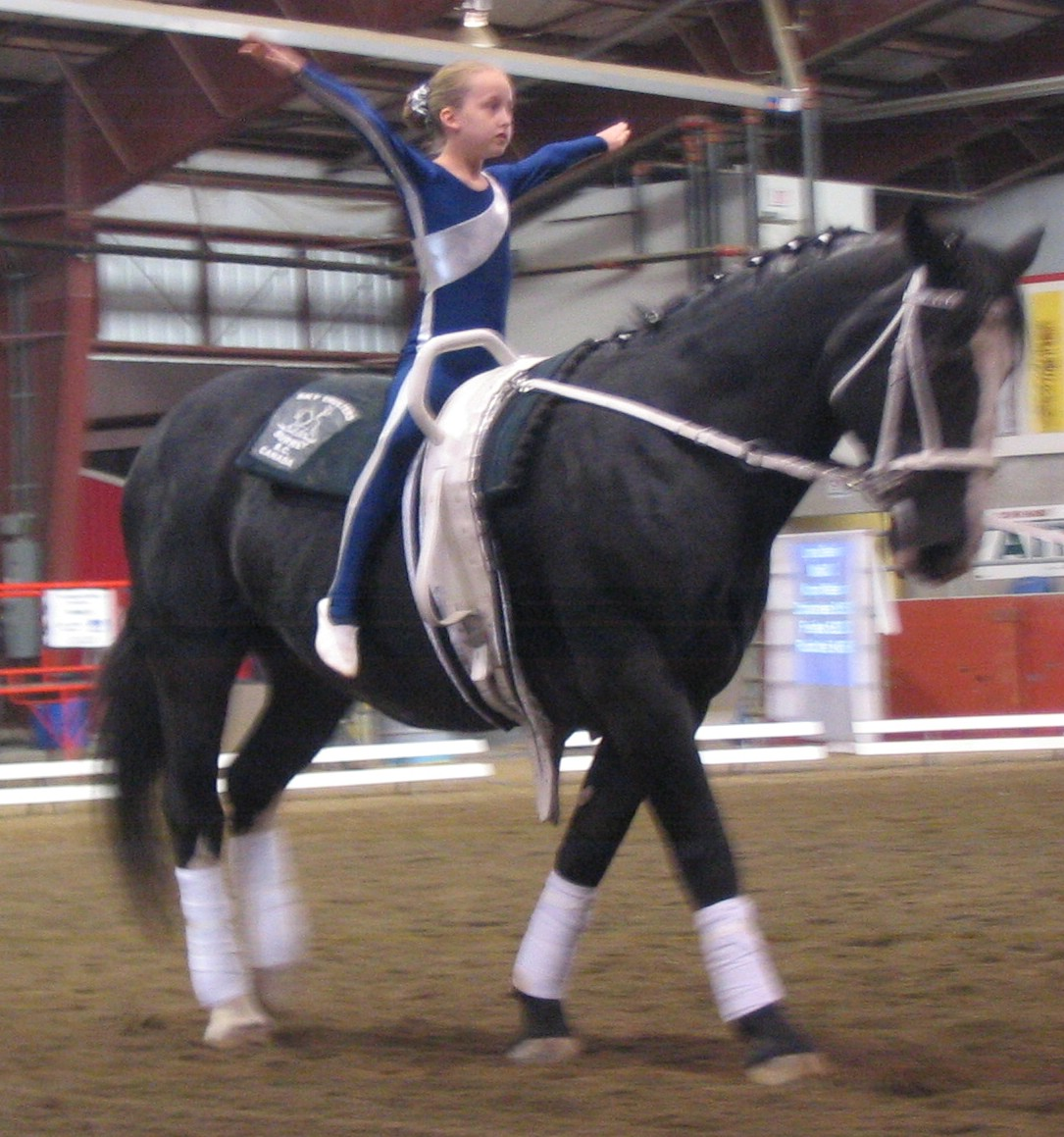
Side reins used on an equestrian vaulting horse

Animation of side reins in use

Side reins are a type of rein used primarily when longeing a horse, running from the bit of the bridle to the saddle or surcingle. As a horse training tool, they encourage flexion and softness in the horse's mouth. For longe line work with a rider up who does not carry ordinary riding reins, they help calm and settle the animal. However, they are a tool best used by experienced handlers; used improperly they may unduly restrict the horse's movement or cause an accident.

== The side rein ==
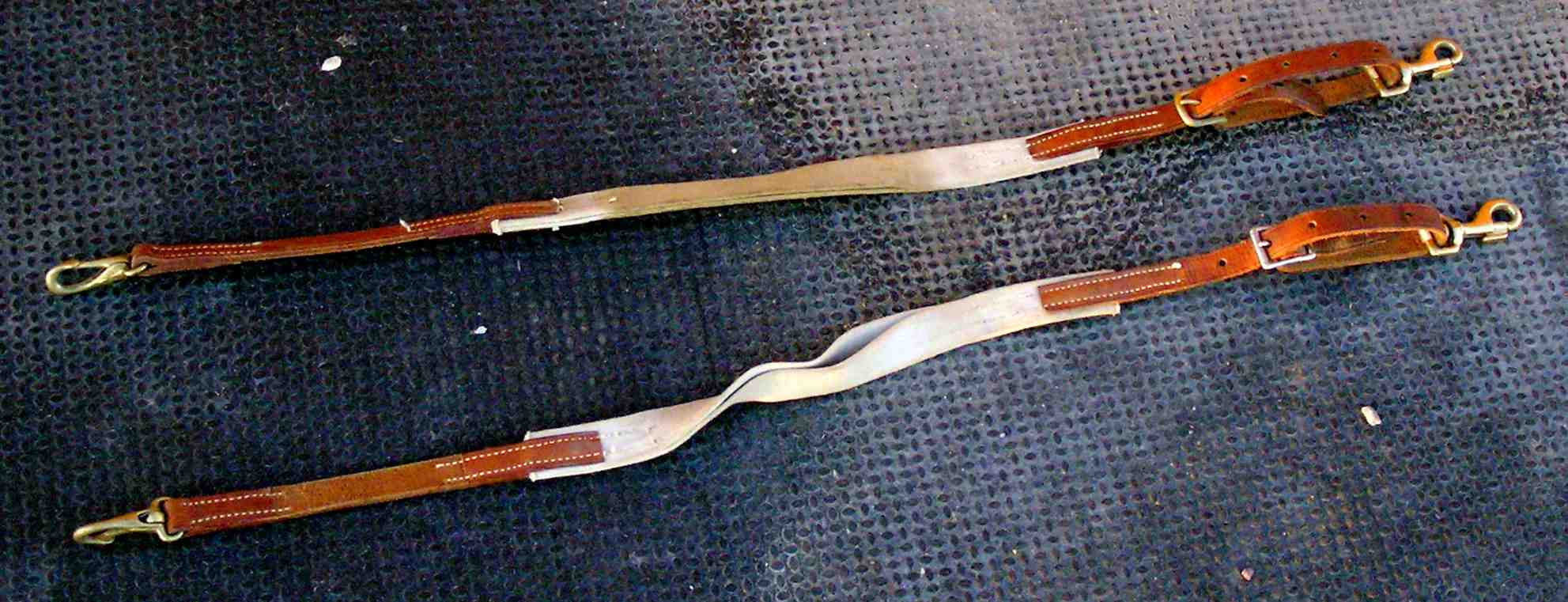
A set of side reins with elastic, buckle adjustment

Side reins are made of leather or webbing, sometimes with added elastic, and have several rings or holes for buckles along their length. They are easily adjusted. Some designs have adjustable buckles and attach to the bit with a snap, other designs run through the bit ring, then fold back on themselves and snap to their own rings.

Side reins may be completely of solid material, or they may have an elastic or rubber ring insert. Each design has its advantages and disadvantages. Designs with elastic have more "give" to them, which is useful for sensitive horses or horses that throw their heads. Elastic inserts must be used with caution, however, as some horses learn to lean on them. Solid side reins are the older, classical design, give the horse a more solid contact to work into and discourage leaning, but must be adjusted with greater care because their lack of give may upset a sensitive horse and, particularly if too tight, may provoke rearing, headshaking and even panic in some animals. Side reins with a rubber donut provide some give, although not as much as elastic and so discourage leaning. However, they are heavier and are prone to bounce when the horse trots or canters, which does not provide as steady a contact as the solid or elastic-insert side reins.

== Uses of the side rein ==
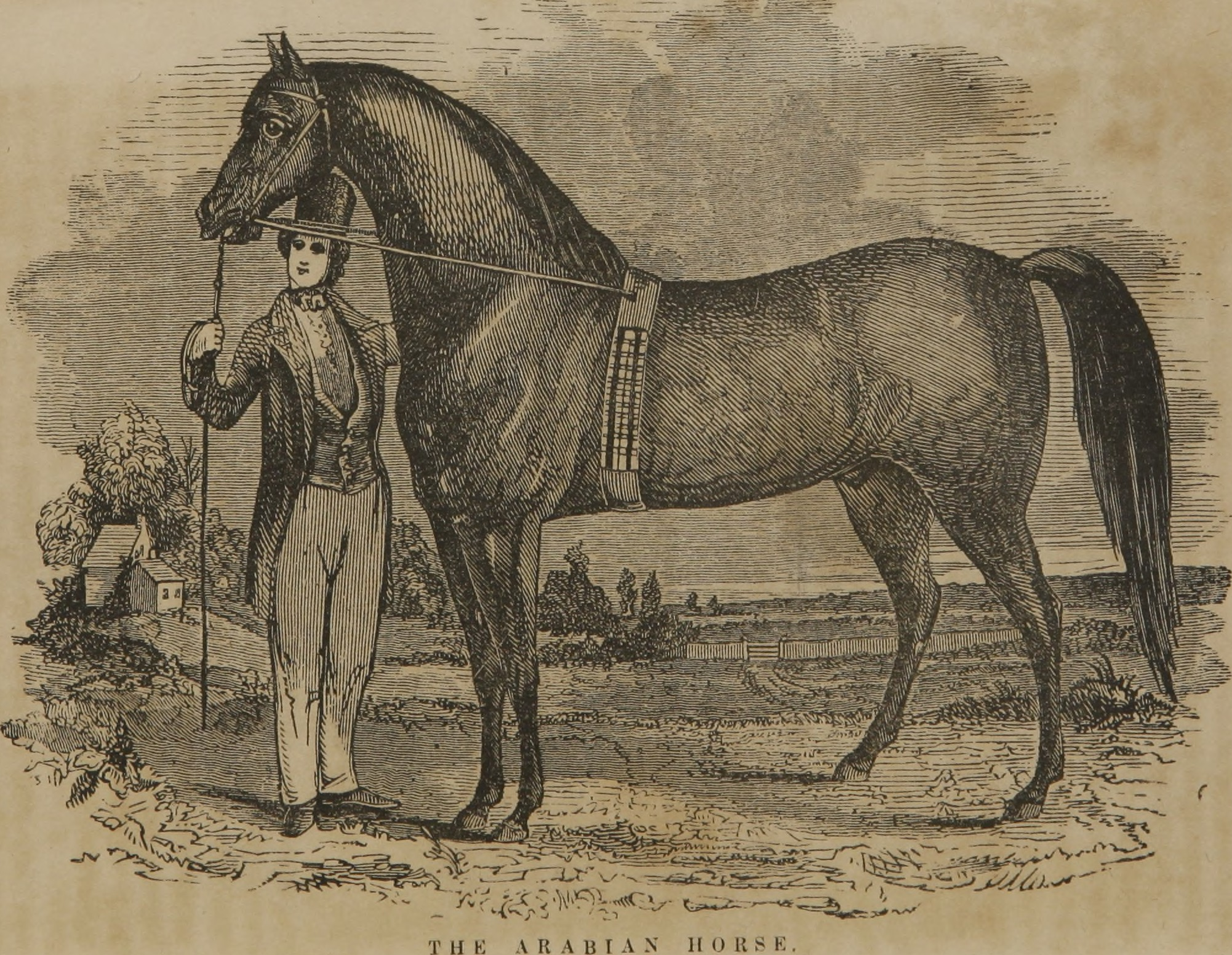
An 1860s image of a horse in side reins

Elasticized side reins are often used with training young horses prior to being ridden. They help accustom a horse to the feel of pressure on the bit, and reward the horse when it gives or flexes to bit pressure. Solid side reins are usually used for more advanced horses. They give the horse something to take contact with, encourage balance and correct head carriage, help a horse develop self-carriage, and help stop a horse from over-bending in the neck.

Side reins are also used with in-hand showing.

== Adjustment of the side rein ==
Side reins may be attached from the bit rings to the surcingle rings, or from the bit to the buckles of the girth of an English saddle or cinch rings of a western saddle.

Side reins are adjusted longer for less-experienced horses, and gradually shortened and raised higher (from point of shoulder up to the point of hip) as a horse becomes better trained. Side reins should never be so short that the horse's head is pulled behind the vertical. For green horses, the side reins should be adjusted so that the horse's head is approximately 4 inches in front of the vertical and the side reins are attached at a point level with the point of the shoulder.

As the horse becomes more advanced and more physically developed, the side reins may be shortened so the head is nearly vertical to the ground. Side reins should not pull the horse in—they do not create collection. Rather, a properly longed horse will collect himself, and the shorter side reins will be the correct length for him to keep a contact with the bit. Short side reins should not be used for long periods of time.

Side reins should usually be adjusted so they are the same length on each side, though in some cases, the inside rein may be slightly shorter, particularly with a horse that has previously been allowed to develop the habit of arcing its body away from the circle. It is considered correct to fasten the outside rein before the inside rein, similarly to the idea that a rider would take up outside contact before inside rein contact. It is best to make sure that both side reins are adjusted before attaching them to the bit, as it can be irritating to the horse to stand with one side rein attached while the handler is adjusting the other.

Improper adjustment of side reins can cause a horse to go behind the bit, spoil the horse's training, and even cause the horse to feel trapped, leading to rearing and the possibility that the horse will flip over.

== When to attach side reins ==
A horse should always be warmed up and cooled down without the side reins, allowed to stretch long and low. When the side reins are first applied during a workout, they should be adjusted long and gradually shortened as the horse warms up into them. Side reins are only for work in the trot and canter. Working a horse in side reins at the walk, other than in brief transitions can spoil the gait by inhibiting forward motion.

Side reins should not be used for jumping, as they restrict the use of the neck too much, and may even cause the horse to fall.

== The sliding side rein/lauffer rein ==
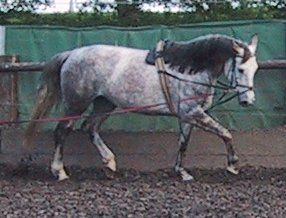
The sliding side rein. These are adjusted with the side reins attaching between the legs.

The sliding side rein gives a bit more freedom to the horse than the standard side rein. It attaches from a lower ring on the surcingle, through the bit ring, and back up to an upper ring on the surcingle. This allows the horse to stretch down and lower his head while still maintaining contact with the bit, and are therefore useful on horses that are tight in the back, carry their head too high, or are learning to stretch forward and down for the bit contact.

Like the side rein, the lauffer rein is adjusted so that the horse has contact with it when his head is at or just in front of the vertical. Green horses should have the lauffer rein attached to a lower and middle surcingle rein, while more advanced horses can have the reins raised to a middle and high ring on the surcingle.

The sliding side rein was designed to be attached to the outside rings of the surcingle, not between the legs. Running the reins between the legs can encourage a horse to get behind the bit and overflex.
