= Horse-drawn vehicle =

Vehicle pulled by one or more horses

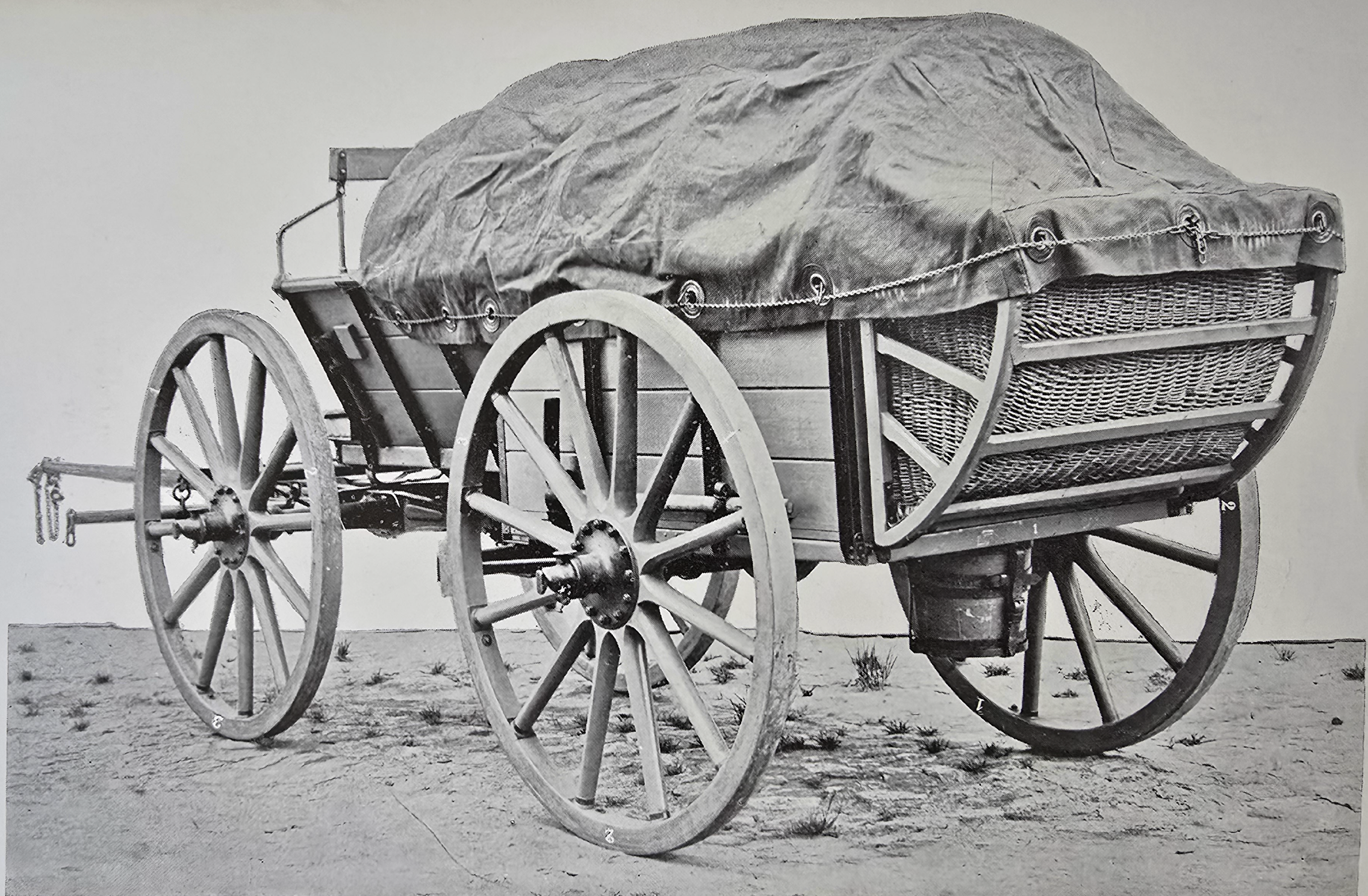
German Empire military baggage wagon (1906)

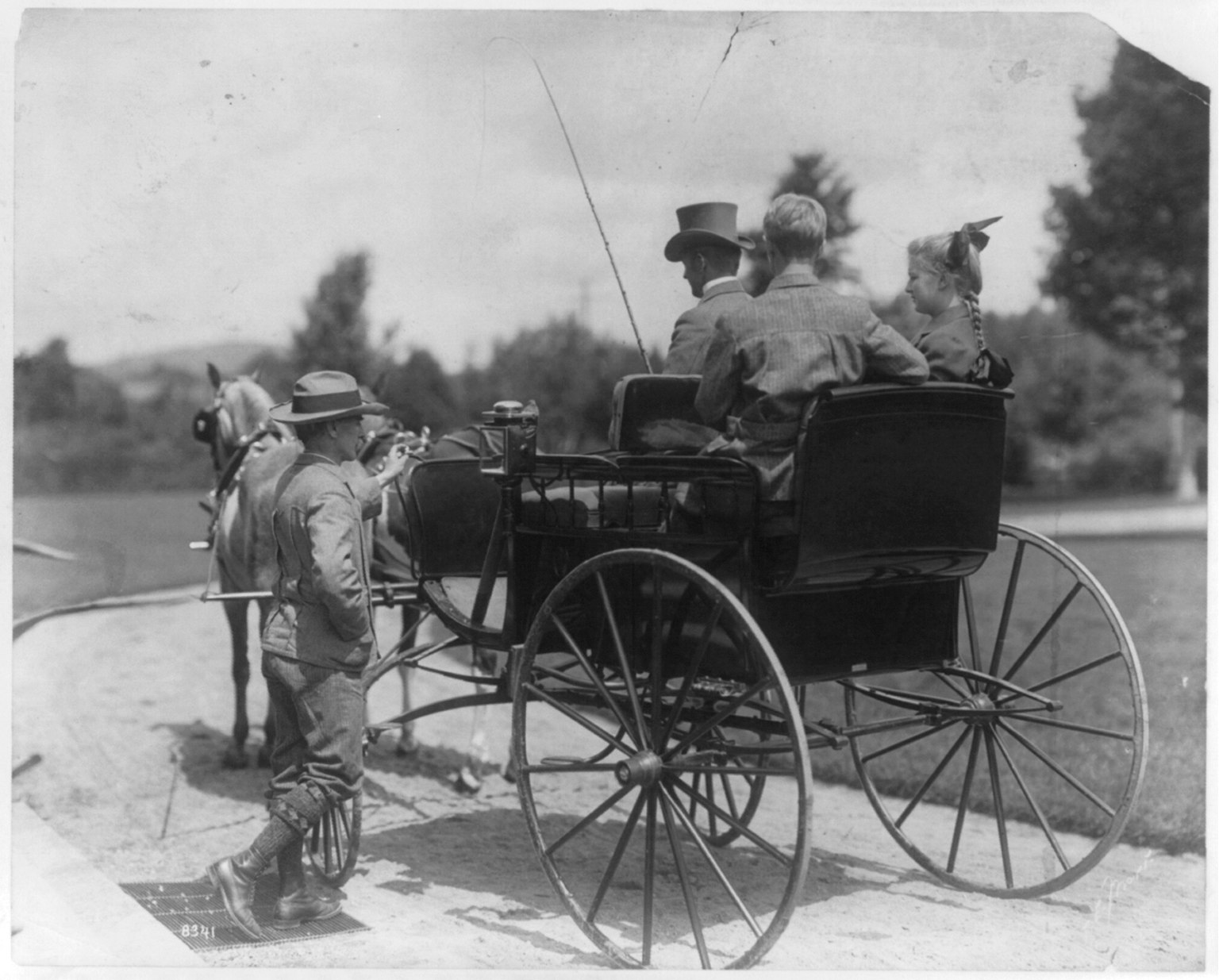
A carriage (1903)

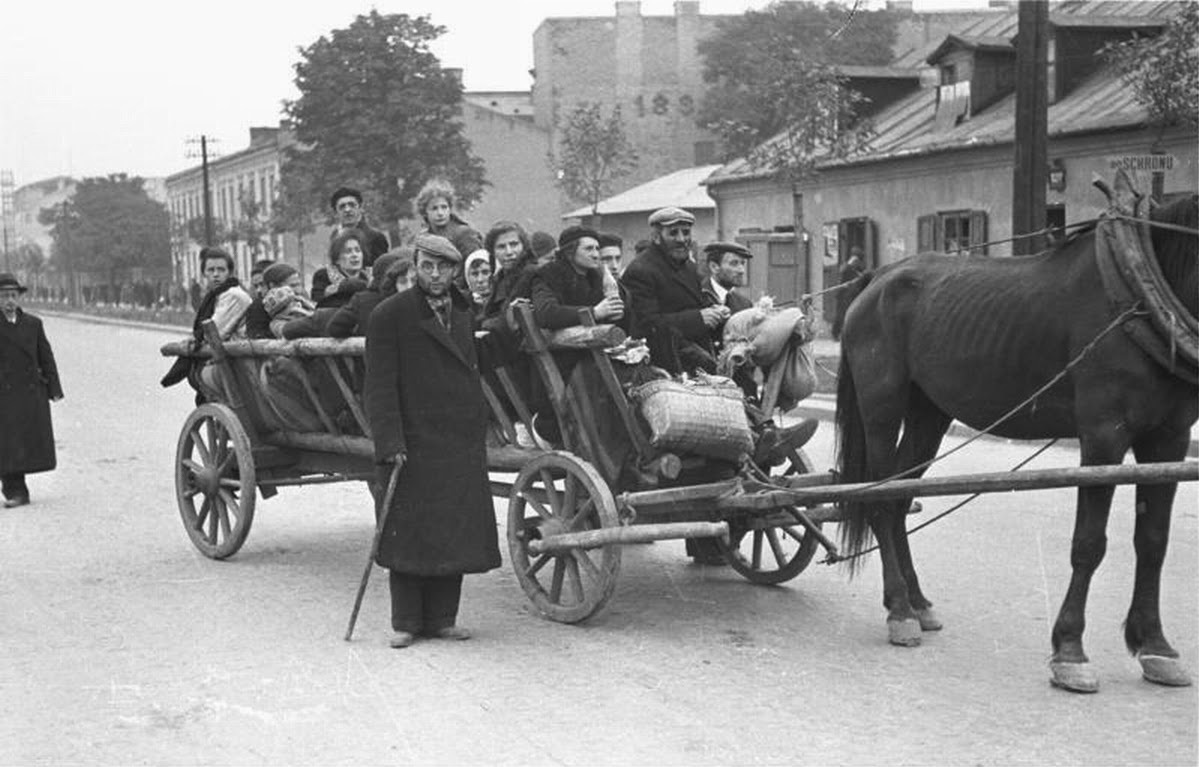
Agricultural wagon, Poland 1939

A horse-drawn vehicle is a wheeled vehicle pulled by horses to carry passengers or a load. They were common during the horse-drawn era, though have mostly been replaced by automobiles and other mechanized transport. Some are still in use today in rural areas, and also for pleasure, tourists, and sport. Many vehicles have been preserved and are on display in carriage museums and transport museums.

== General ==
Horses were domesticated circa 2000 BCE. Before that oxen were used. Historically, a wide variety of arrangements of horses and vehicles have been used, from chariot racing, which involved a small vehicle and four horses abreast, to horsecars or trollies, (Note: The term horsecar is used primarily in the UK to refer to a rail-based vehicle drawn by horses. In the US, the term streetcar or trolley is used, but those same terms could refer to the electric versions as well.) which used two horses to pull a car that was used in cities before electric trams were developed.

A two-wheeled horse-drawn vehicle is a cart (see various types below, both for carrying people and for goods). Four-wheeled vehicles have many names – one for heavy loads is most commonly called a wagon. Very light carts and wagons can also be pulled by donkeys (much smaller than horses), ponies or mules. Other smaller animals are occasionally used, such as large dogs, llamas and goats (see draught animals). Heavy wagons, carts and agricultural implements can also be pulled by other large draught animals such as oxen, water buffalo, yaks or even camels and elephants.

Vehicles pulled by one horse (or by two in a single file) have two shafts that attach either side of the rearmost horse (the wheeler). Two animals in single file are referred to as a tandem arrangement, and three as a randem. Vehicles that are pulled by a pair (or by a team of several pairs) have a pole that attaches between the wheelers. Other arrangements are also possible, for example, three or more abreast (a troika), a wheel pair with a single lead animal (a unicorn), or a wheel pair with three lead animals abreast (a pick axe). Very heavy loads sometimes had an additional team behind to slow the vehicle down steep hills. Sometimes at a steep hill with frequent traffic, such a team would be hired to passing wagons to help them up or down the hill. Horse-drawn carriages have been in use for at least 3,500 years.

Two-wheeled vehicles are balanced by the distribution of weight of the load (driver, passengers, and goods) over the axle, and then held level by the animal – this means that the shafts (or sometimes a pole for two animals) must be fixed rigidly to the vehicle's body. Four-wheeled vehicles remain level on their own, and so the shafts or pole are hinged vertically, allowing them to rise and fall with the movement of the animals. A four-wheeled vehicle is also steered by the shafts or pole, which are attached to the front axle; this swivels on a fifth wheel beneath the vehicle.

From the 15th century drivers of carts were known as carmen, and in London were represented by the Worshipful Company of Carmen. In 1890 there were 13,800 companies in the United States in the business of building carriages pulled by horses. By 1920, only 90 such companies remained.

== Basic types ==
Wheeled horse-drawn vehicles can be divided into a few basic types: two-wheeled carts, four-wheeled carriages, enclosed coaches, and utilitarian wagons.

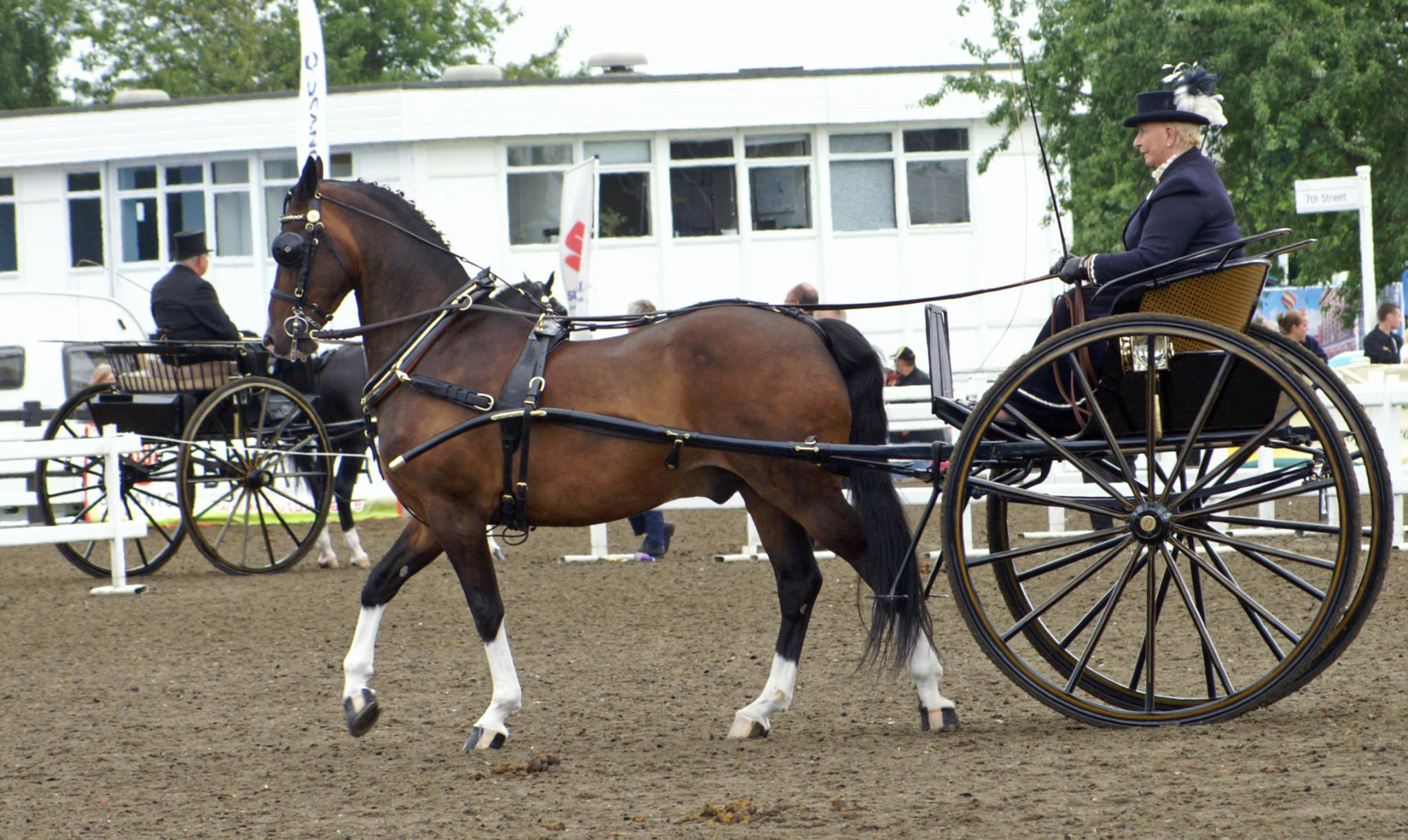
Cart – Two wheels, one horse

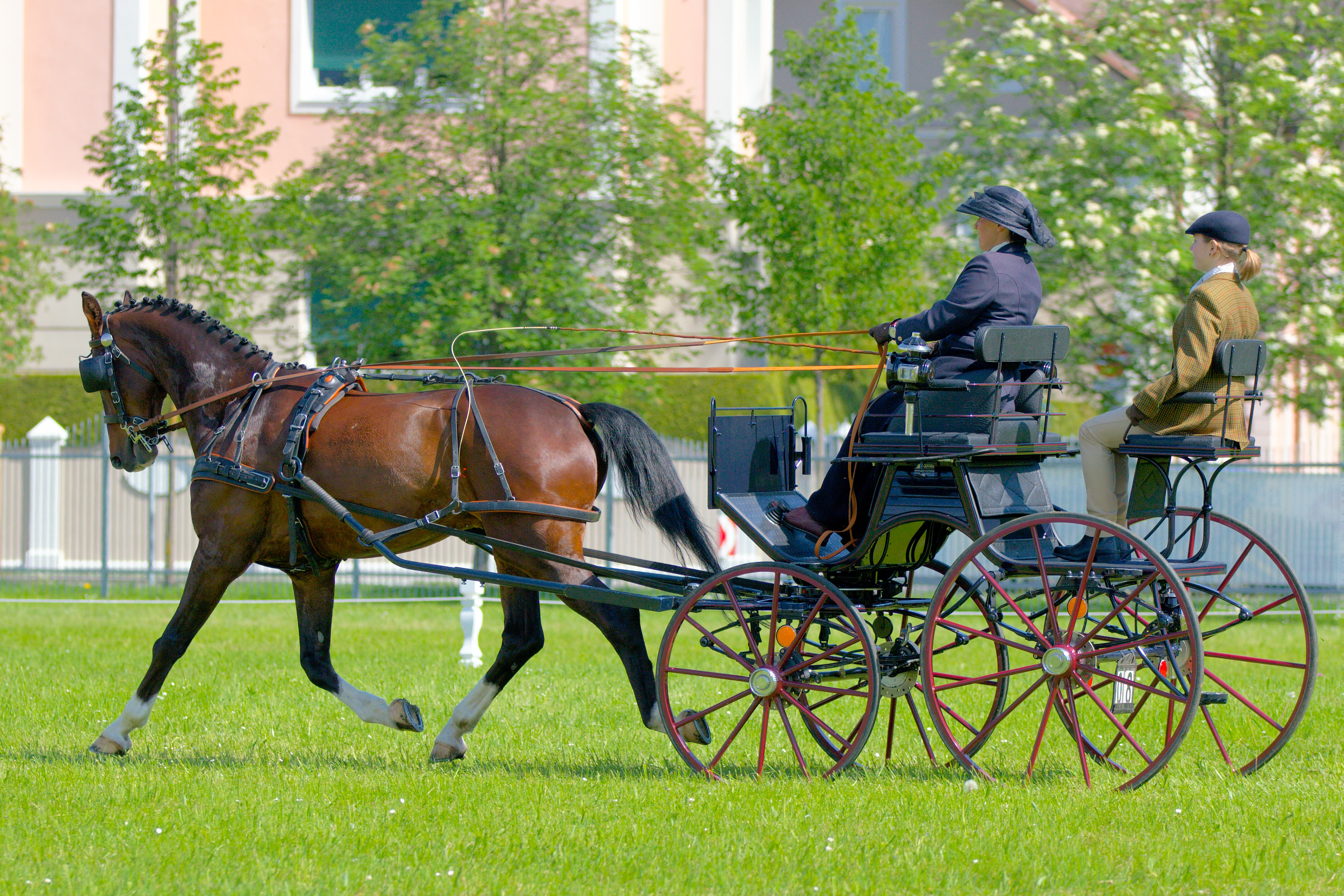
Carriage – Four wheels

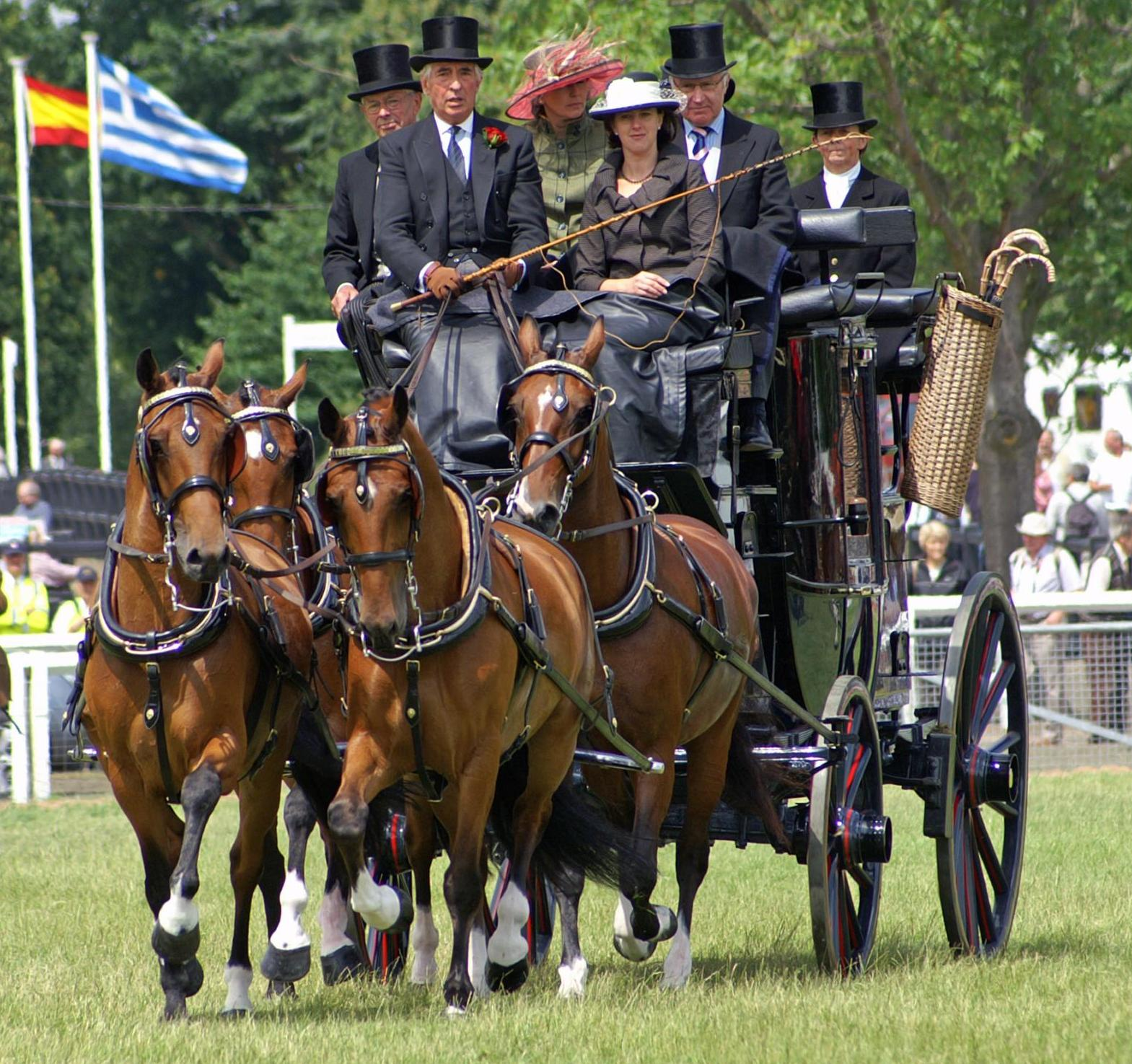
Coach – Multiple passengers and horses

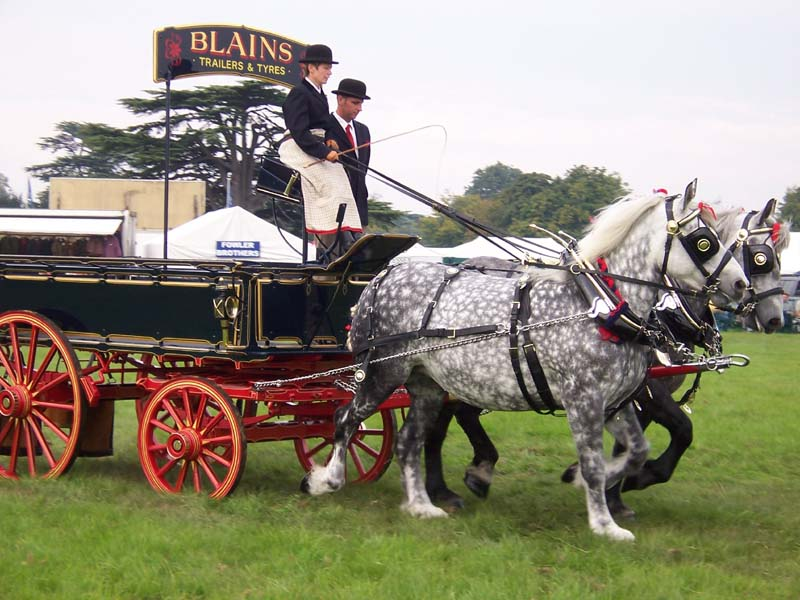
Wagon – Four wheels, agricultural or delivery

== Passenger vehicles ==
- Carriage: Technically, carriage meant the underpart of a vehicle (now called undercarriage or chassis) upon which the body was mounted, but has come to mean all wheeled vehicles, mostly four-wheeled passenger vehicles.
- Coach: A large, usually closed, four-wheeled carriage with two or more horses harnessed as a team, controlled by a coachman.
- Dos-à-dos: A seating arrangement where passengers sit back-to-back; may be used to refer to a carriage that has this seating arrangement.
- Equipage and turnout: terms meaning the combined package of the vehicle, horses, harness, driver, attendants, their clothing, fittings, and accessories.

=== Two‑wheeled ===
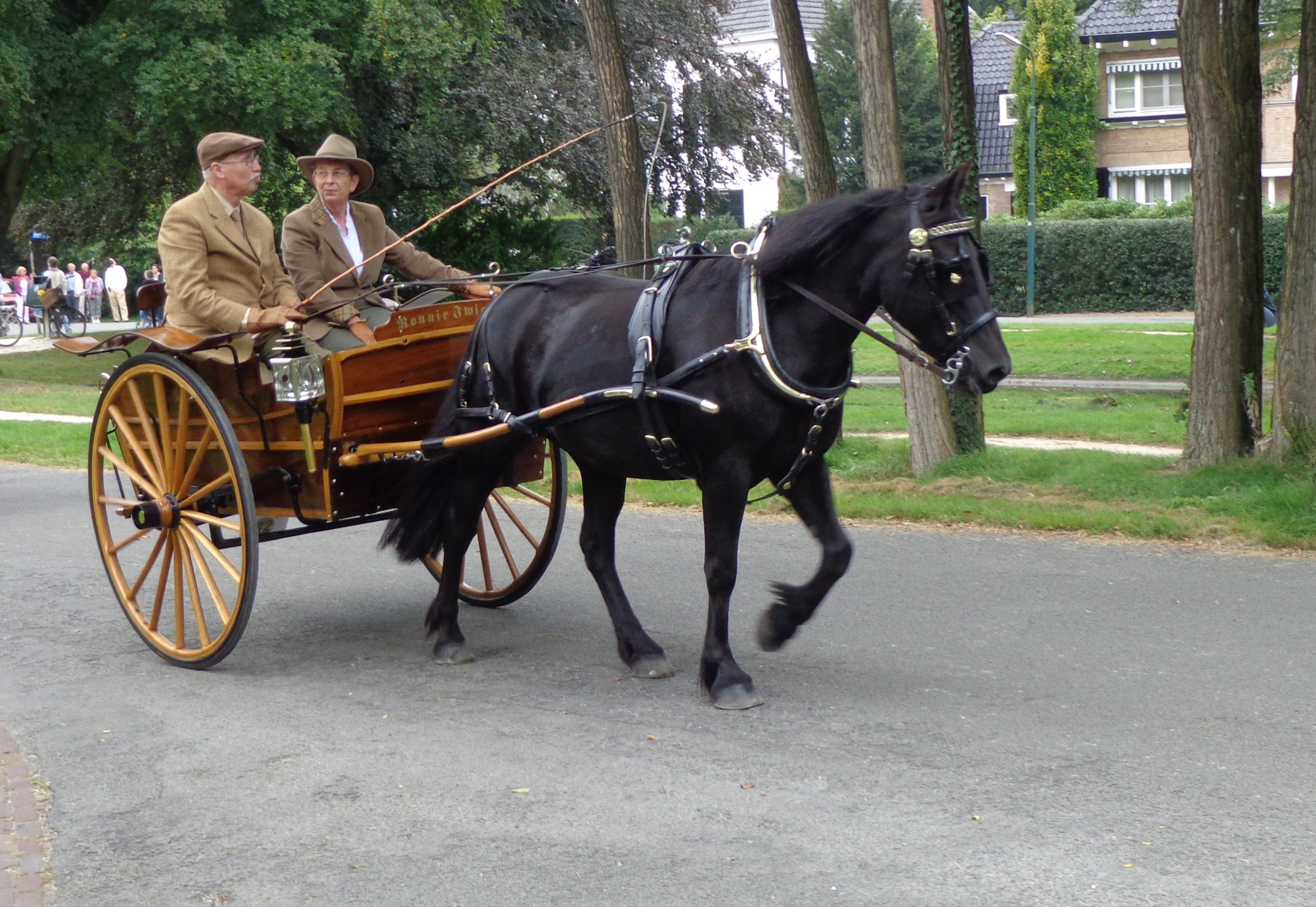
A passenger cart

The term "cart" is a category of horse-drawn vehicles which have two wheels, with some of the nicer passenger cart designs named cars.

- Cabriolet: A two-wheel carriage with a folding hood, driven by its owner; a groom stands on a platform behind the carriage body.
- Cape cart: A heavy two-wheeled four-seater carriage drawn by a pair of horses; originated in South Africa and later used in Australia, New Zealand and England.
- Cariole: A narrow two-wheeled carriage from Norway with long shafts and a rear platform for the driver or luggage; not to be confused with a type of Canadian sleigh of the same name.
- Chaise: An early narrow two-wheeled carriage with a falling hood.
- Cidomo: A brightly colored two-wheeled taxi in Indonesia.
- Curricle: A two-wheeled carriage drawn by two horses abreast, with a falling hood and a groom on a step behind the carriage body.
- Dogcart: Carried four passengers, two facing forward and two facing the rear, with a compartment under the seats which was originally designed for transporting hunting dogs; it became an all-purpose vehicle.
- Ekka: A crude cart of India where the shafts rest on the back of the horse; often covered, and usually only large enough for a single person.
- English buggy: A gig fitted with a folding leather hood, usually for seating only a single person.
- Gig: A high two-wheeled carriage pulled by one horse.
- Governess car: A tub-shaped cart with two inward-facing bench seats, high sides and entry from the rear.
- Hansom cab: A tall two-wheeled box-shaped carriage used for public hire transport in the 1800s; the driver sits on a high seat behind the passenger compartment and looks over the roof.
- Jaunting car: An Irish cart in which passengers sit back-to-back facing sideways with their feet outboard of the wheels.
- Ralli car: A later variant of the dogcart but with outward flaring sides.
- Shay: Colloquial North American spelling for chaise.
- Stanhope gig: A gig with ample storage under the seat; designed by Fitzroy Stanhope with a springing system which attempted to make travel more comfortable for the passengers.
- Sulky: Originally any light two-wheeled carriage with seating for one. The modern sulky is an extremely light one-man cart used for harness racing.
- Tanga or tonga: Originally a two-wheeled cart of India drawn by a pair of horses, much like a dogcart. Modern tangas are drawn by a single horse with seating for four, and a canvas-type cover.
- Tilbury: A gig without under-seat storage and with a seven-spring arrangement making it heavy.
- Trap (two-wheeled): A back-to-back seated cart with a flip-down board for the rear passenger's footrest.

=== Four‑wheeled ===
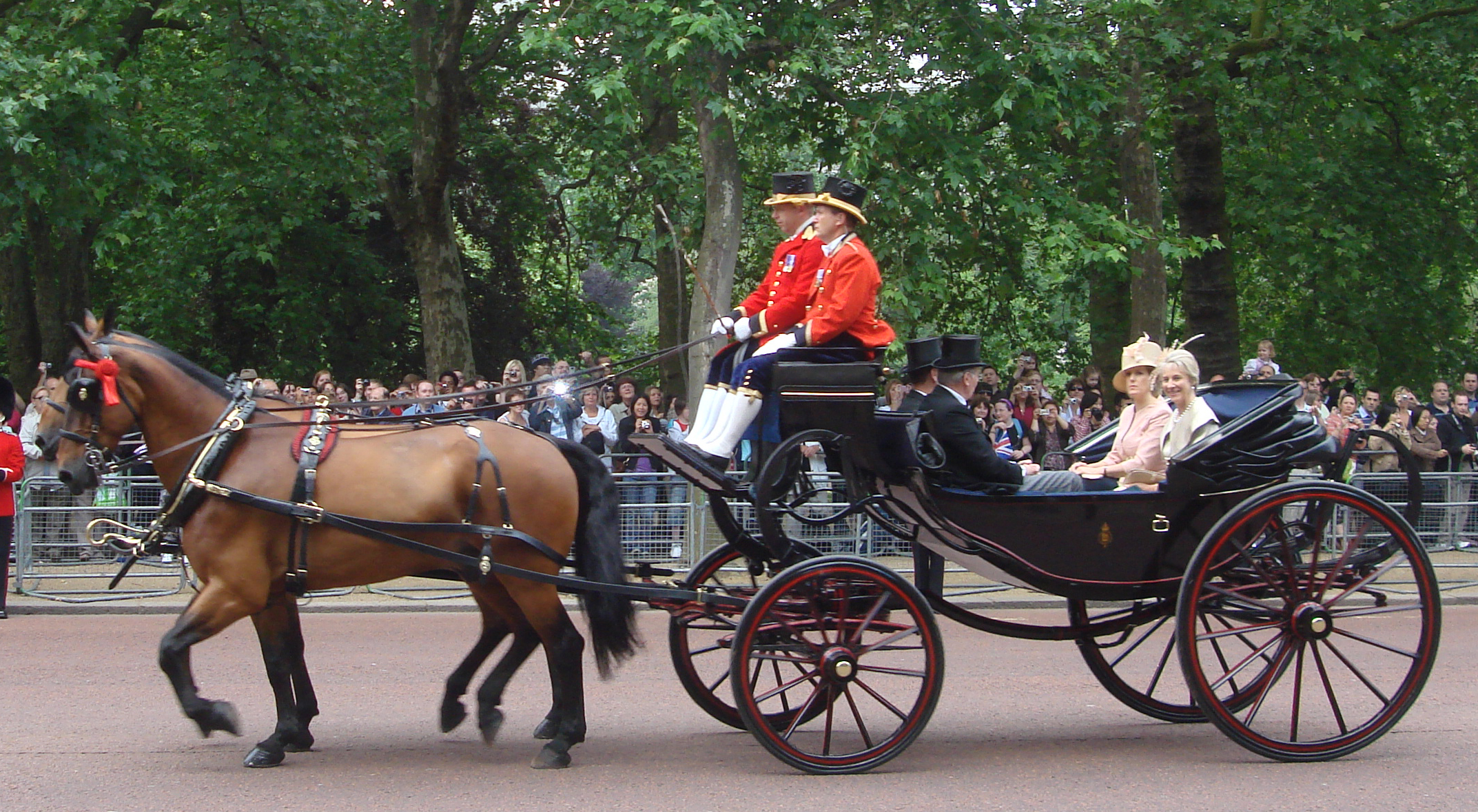
Carriage

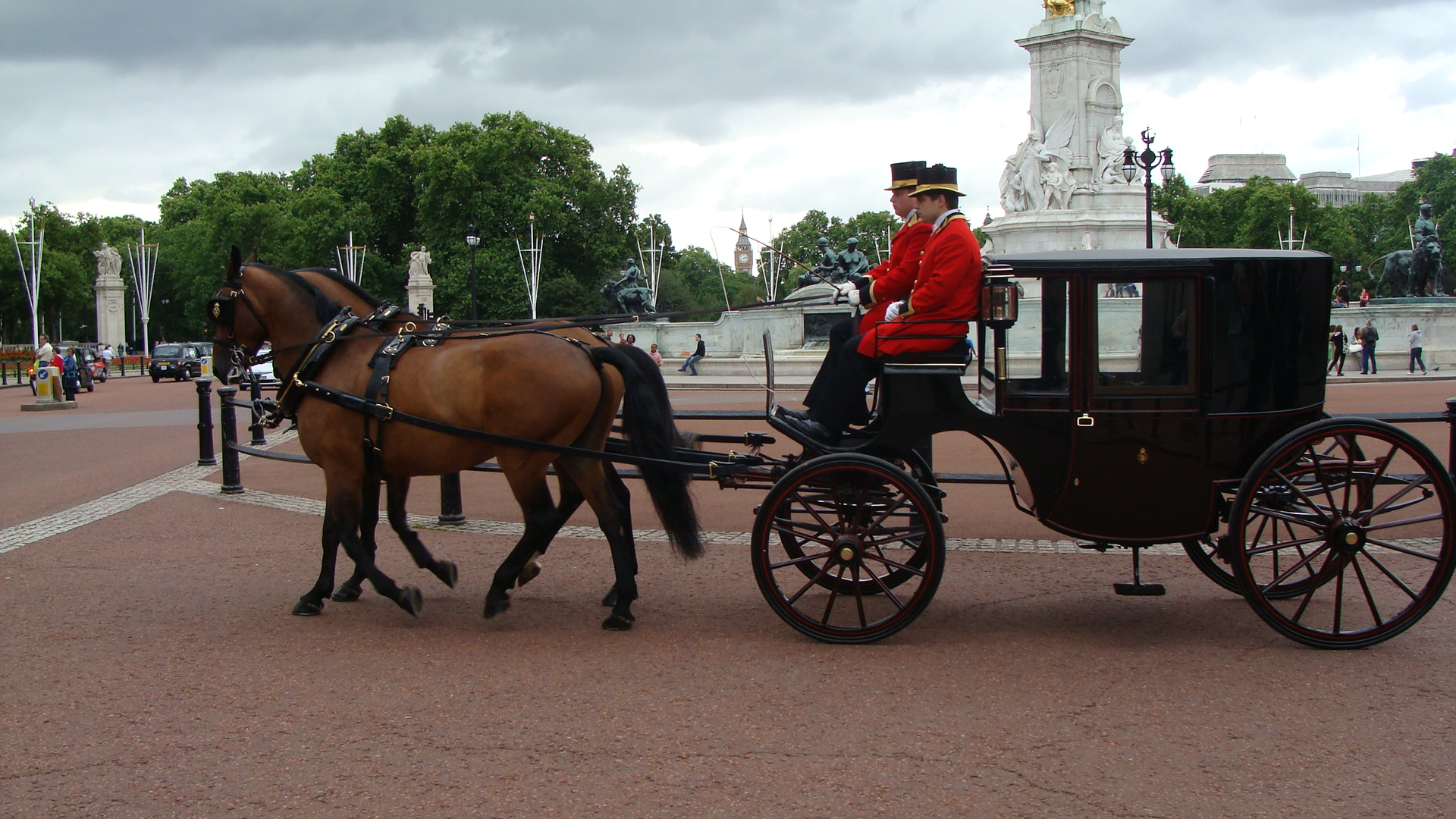
Coach

This category includes carriages (open), coaches (enclosed), and passenger vehicles on runners such as sleighs.

- Barouche: An elegant, high-slung, open carriage with a seat in the rear of the body and a raised bench at the front for the driver, a servant.
- Berlin: A four-wheeled covered carriage developed in the 17th century.
- Brake: Originally break, a heavy four-wheeled carriage frame for breaking horses, later several passenger vehicles built on the same framework and size.
- Britzka: A long, spacious carriage of four wheels, pulled by two horses.
- Brougham: A specific, light four-wheeled carriage, circa mid-19th century.
- Buckboard: A very simple four-wheeled wagon, circa the early 19th century.
- Buggy: A light, open, four-wheeled carriage, often driven by its owner.
- Calash or Calèshe: see barouche: A four-wheeled, shallow vehicle with two double seats inside, arranged vis-à-vis so that the sitters on the front seat faced those on the back seat.
- Carryall: A type of carriage used in the United States in the 19th century. It is a light, four-wheeled vehicle, usually drawn by a single horse and with seats for four or more passengers.
- Charabanc: A larger wagon pulled by multiple horses.
- Clarence: A closed, four-wheeled horse-drawn vehicle with a projecting glass front and seats for four passengers inside.
- Coupé: A shortened coach which holds only two passengers.
- Diligence: A French stagecoach; the 19th-century ones came in three sizes, La petite diligence, La grande diligence and L'impériale.
- Drag: A coach used for pleasure or driving clubs (after the era of coaches for mail and passenger transport).
- Droshky or Drozhki: A low, four-wheeled open carriage used especially in Russia.
- Fiacre: A form of hackney coach, a horse-drawn four-wheeled carriage for hire.
- Fly: A horse-drawn public coach or delivery wagon, especially one let out for hire.
- Gharry: A horse-drawn cab especially used in India.
- Growler: An early four-wheeled coach for hire.
- Hackney carriage: A carriage for hire, especially in London.
- Herdic: An American type of horse-drawn carriage, used as a taxi and omnibus.
- Karozzin: A traditional Maltese carriage drawn by one horse or a pair.
- Kid hack: A van used in the US for carrying children to and from school.
- Landau: A low-shelled, luxury, convertible carriage.
- Mail coach: A stagecoach primarily for the carriage of mail, though also carrying passengers.
- Omnibus: A large enclosed vehicle used for multiple-passenger transport.
- Phaeton: A light-weight horse-drawn open carriage (usually with two seats).
- Post chaise: A fast carriage for traveling post in the 18th and early 19th centuries.
- Rockaway: A term applied to two types of carriage: a light, low, United States four-wheel carriage with a fixed top and open sides that may be covered by waterproof curtains, and a heavy carriage enclosed at sides and rear, with a door on each side.
- Sleigh: A vehicle with runners for use in snow.
- Stagecoach: A public coach traveling in timetabled stages between stables that supply fresh horses.
- State coach: A highly decorative ceremonial coach used by a monarch or head of state on state occasions.
- Surrey: A popular American doorless, four-wheeled carriage of the late 19th and early 20th centuries, usually two seated for four passengers.
- Tarantass or Tarantas: A Russian four-wheeled horse-drawn vehicle on a long longitudinal frame.
- Trap (four-wheeled): A back-to-back seated carriage with a flip-down board for the rear passenger's footrest.
- Troika: A sleigh drawn by three horses harnessed abreast; occasionally, a similar wheeled vehicle.
- Vardo: A traditional horse-drawn wagon used by English Romani Gypsies.
- Victoria: An elegant carriage with a front-facing bench seat, a low-slung body, and driven by a servant.
- Vis-à-vis: Refers to the seating arrangement, with a rear seat facing forward and the forward seat facing to the rear.
- Vozok: Russian winter vehicle, fully enclosed sleigh like a coach on runners.
- Wagonette: A four-wheeled vehicle for carrying people, usually with a forward-facing seat at the front and two rows of inward-facing seats behind.

== Load carrying vehicles ==
=== Two-wheeled ===
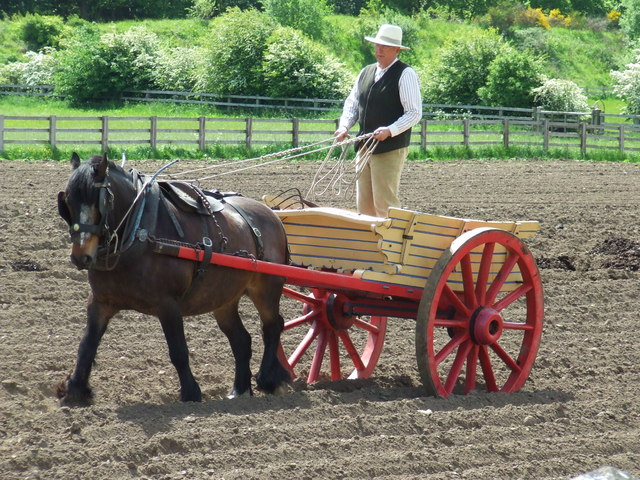
Utilitarian cart

A utilitarian load-carrying cart might be sprung or unsprung. Carts without springs were for heavier loads and slower travel. Carts with springs might be for carrying products that should not be jarred by bumps in the road, or which included a ride-along driver such as for daily deliveries of milk to homes.

- Bandy: An Indian cart of a flat platform with a long tongue, usually pulled by two bullocks, though sometimes two horses; the driver sits astride the tongue.
- Chasse-marée: A French framework-only cart for carrying at speed baskets of fresh fish from the ocean to inland markets before refrigeration.
- Float: A low rear-entry vehicle for delivery of goods to households, such as milk.

=== Four-wheeled ===
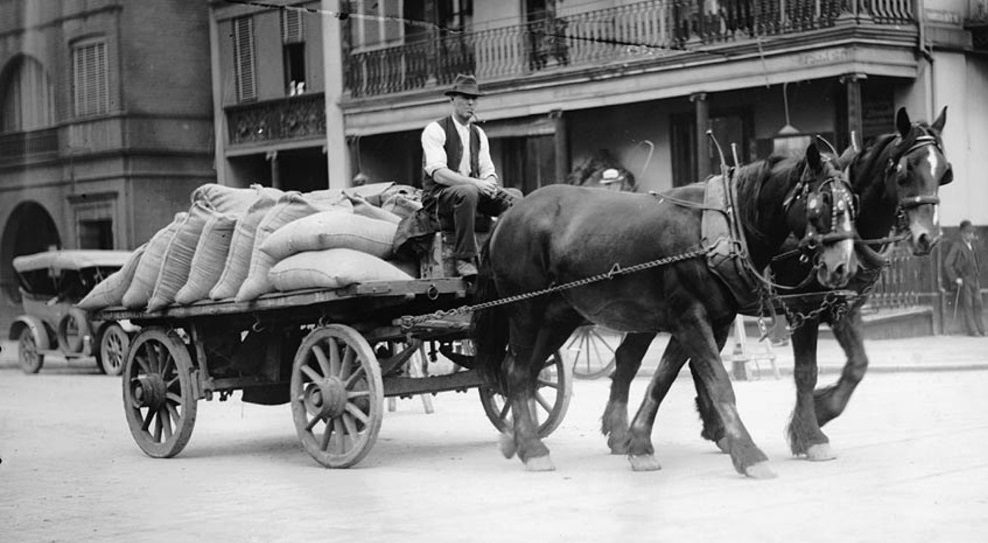
Flat wagon or trolley

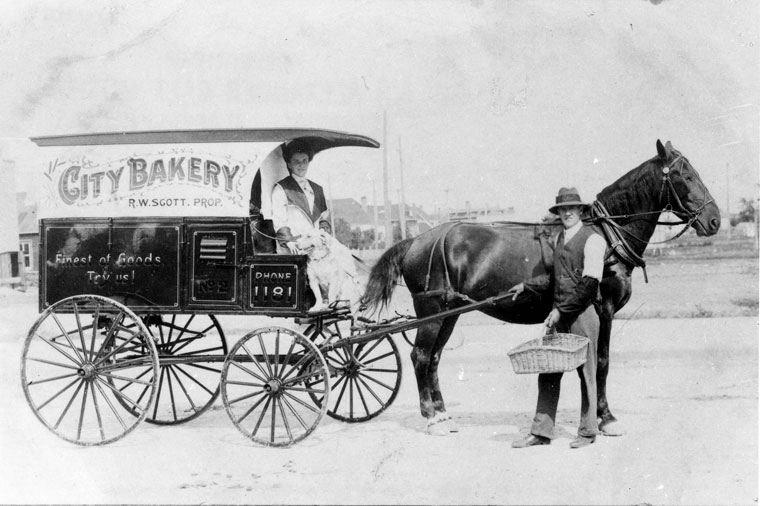
A delivery vehicle

- Bow wagon: An unsprung agricultural wagon with sides raised and bowed over the wheels in the manner of mudguards, to keep bulky loads such as straw from contact with them.
- Chuckwagon: A wagon working as a field kitchen.
- Conestoga wagon: A large, curved-bottom wagon for carrying commercial or government freight.
- Covered wagon: The name given to canvas-topped farm wagons used by North American settlers to move both their families and household goods westward. Varieties of this wagon include the Conestoga wagon (larger wagons able to carry large amounts of goods and primarily used on flat trails, for example, the Santa Fe Trail) and prairie schooner (smaller wagons more suited for mountainous regions, for example, the Oregon and California Trails).
- Lorry: A low-loading platform body with four small wheels mounted underneath it. The driver's seat was mounted on the headboard.
- Pantechnicon van: a heavy furniture moving van with a low floor and ramps, originally used by London company The Pantechnicon.
- Sledge: Low flat platform on runners (not wheels) for hauling heavy loads.
- Telega: A Russian wagon, crudely made, usually unsprung.
- Travois: An A-frame of poles, its apex resting on the back of the horse and dragged on the ground behind it; the space between the poles bridged to carry a small load.
- Trolley: Like a lorry, but with slightly larger wheels and a slightly higher deck. The driver's seat was mounted on the headboard.
- Trolley and lift van: A standardized trolley and a lift van, a standardized box, designed to fit each other or any other of the same sort. The lift van was the direct counterpart of the modern container in the materials and size appropriate to its time.
- Wagon: a four-wheeled vehicle for transport of goods
- Wain: Early English name for a wagon, especially those used in farm work.

== Historic public transport vehicles ==
Public transport
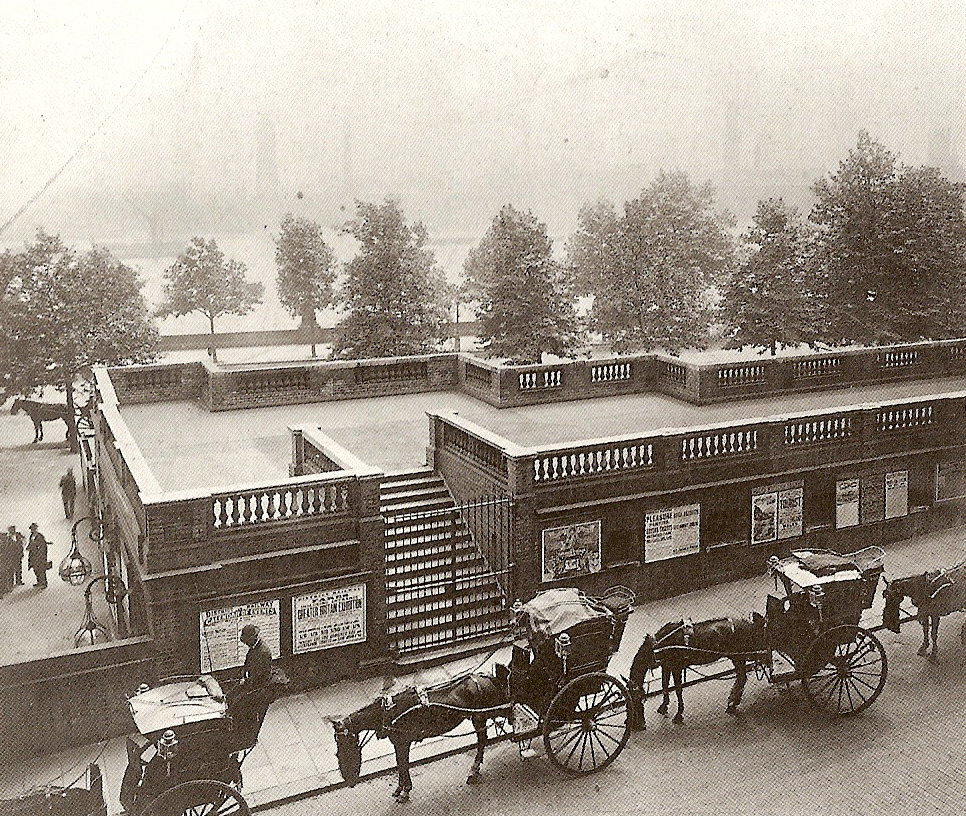
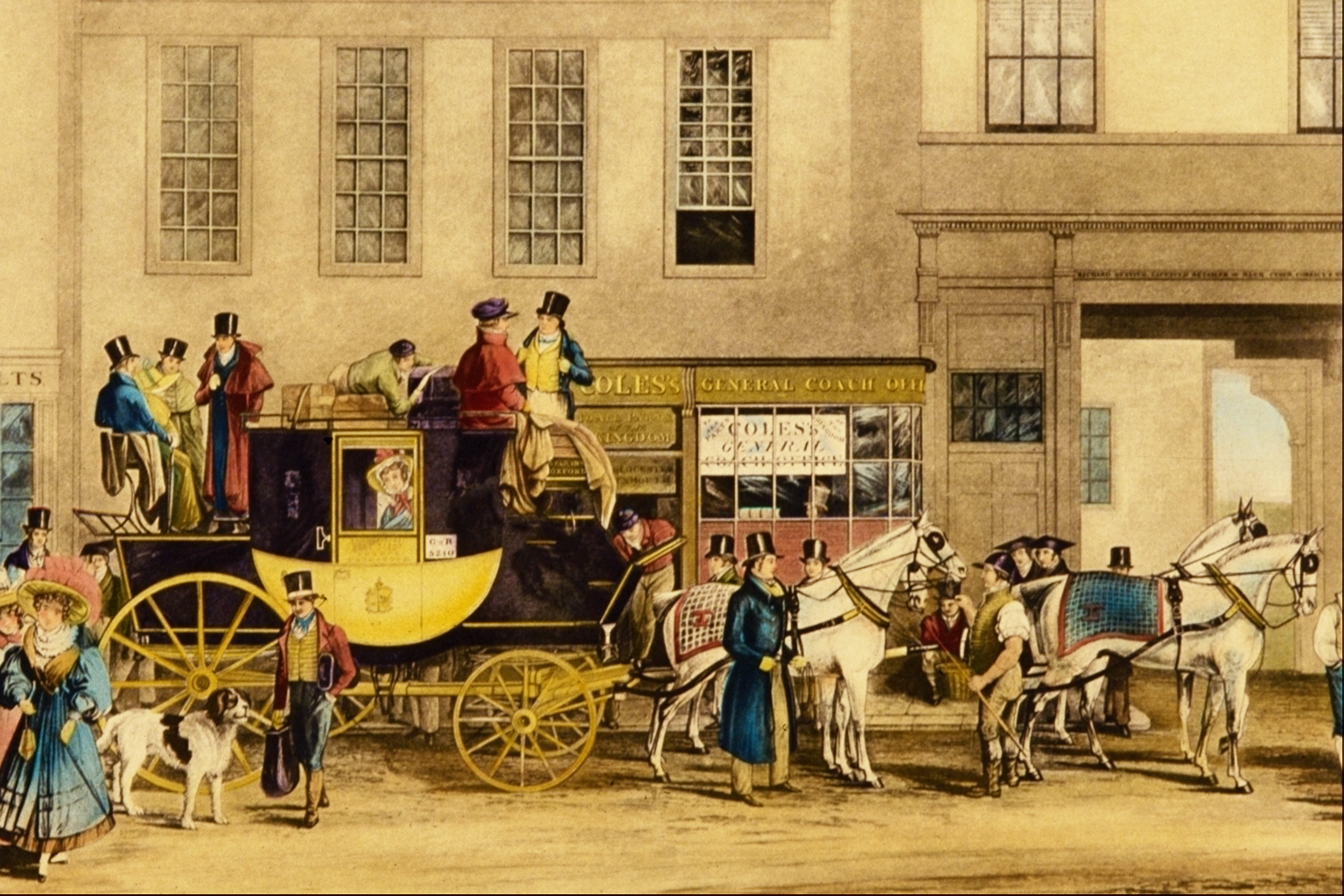
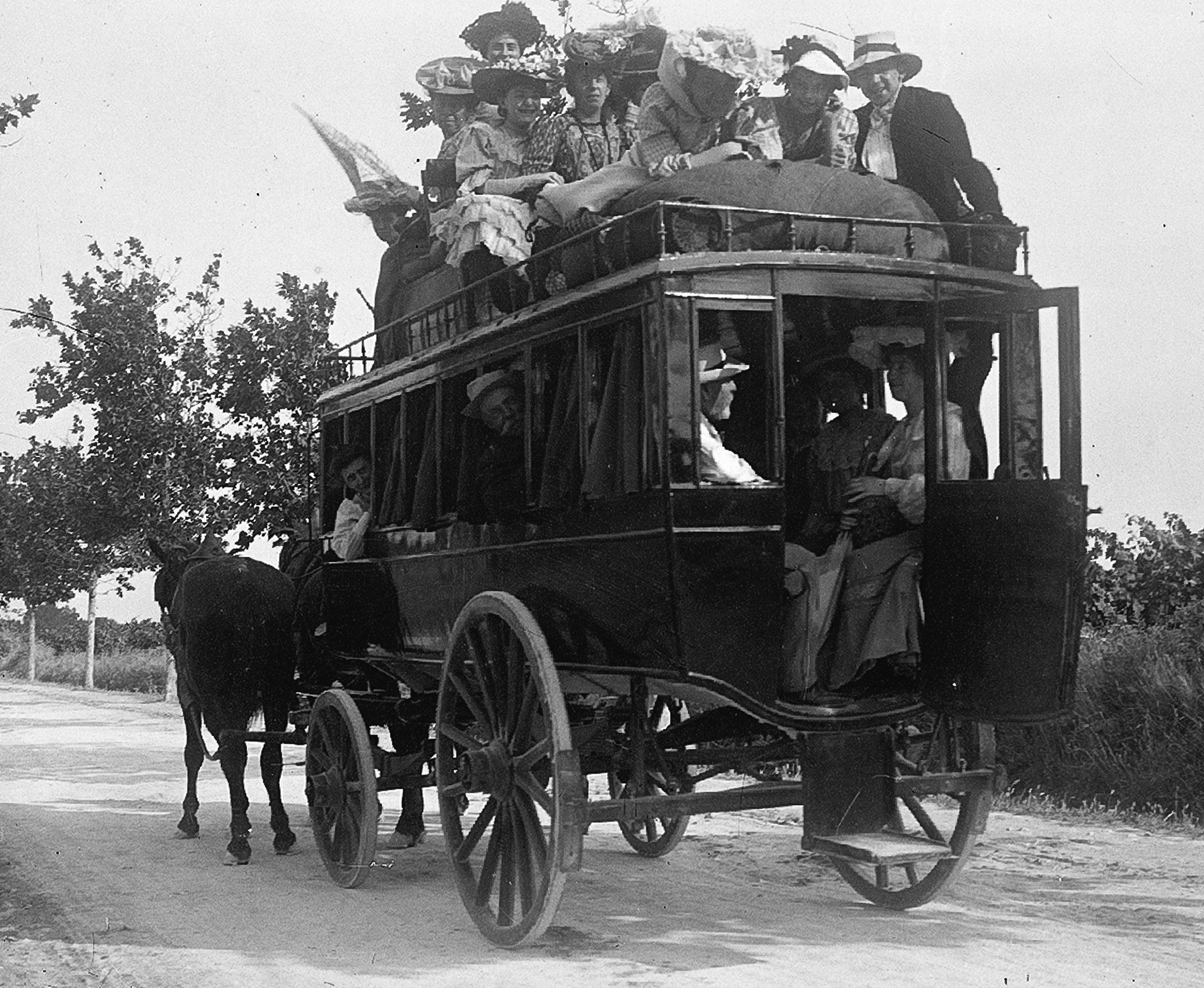
Hansom cabs for hire (1899), painting of a stagecoach (1831), omnibus (20th century)

In general terms, hackney cab usually means a two-wheeled vehicle for hire pulled by a single horse, and hackney coach usually means an enclosed four-wheeled vehicle for hire.

Articles related to hackney types for hire:

- Cabriolet, early French and English; this carriage is where the name 'cab' came from
- Fiacre, French
- Hansom cab, English
- Gharry, Indian

Long distance transport, usually involving stages and changes of vehicle or teams of horses:

- Stagecoach, English and American
- Diligence, French
- Mail coach, English
- Post chaise, English

Larger passenger vehicles or services:

- Carrosses à cinq sols, French, very early hackney coach style vehicles with set routes and schedules
- Omnibus, bus drawn by horse(s)
- Horsecar, tram drawn by horse(s)
- Charabanc, tourist and sightseeing

== Other horse-powered transport and equipment ==
Horses were historically used to pull a wide range of equipment and conveyances not classified as horse-drawn vehicles.

=== Agricultural ===
- Harrow
- Hay rake
- Manure spreader
- Plough or plow
- Potato spinner
- Reaper
- Reaper-binder
- Seed drill
- Skidder
- Snowplow
- Thresher

=== Rail-based ===
- Dandy waggon
- Horsecar
- Slate waggon
- Wagonway

=== Waterways ===
- Horse-drawn boat
- Flyboat
- Horse ferry
- Narrowboat
- Trekschuit
- Widebeam

=== Military ===
- Chariot
- Gun carriage
- Horse artillery
- Limbers and caissons
- Scythed chariot
- Tachanka
- War wagon

== See also ==
- Cart
- Combined driving
- Draft horse
- Municipal horse
- Driving (horse)
- Guard stone
- Horse harness
- Naturmobil
- Wagon
- Glossary of carriage and driving terminology
- Bibliography of carriages and driving
