= Trap (carriage) =

Type of horse-drawn carriage

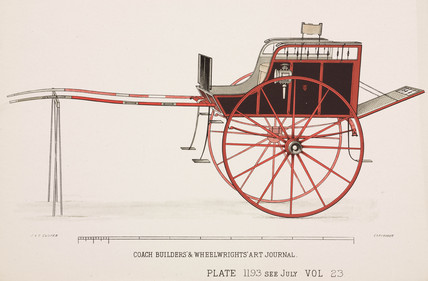
Trap

A trap is a light two- or four-wheeled carriage, with two passenger seats back-to-back, and a tailgate-like trapdoor at the rear which supports the feet of the rear passengers. In the eighteenth century, the first carriage to be called a trap was a gig with a hinged trapdoor, under which was a place to carry hunting dogs. In late nineteenth century US, four-wheeled dogcarts with convertible seats also started to become known as traps.

Today, "trap" is slang for almost any small two- or four-wheeled carriage in the UK in the same way the word "buggy" has become a generic term for "carriage" in the United States.

== Design and variations ==
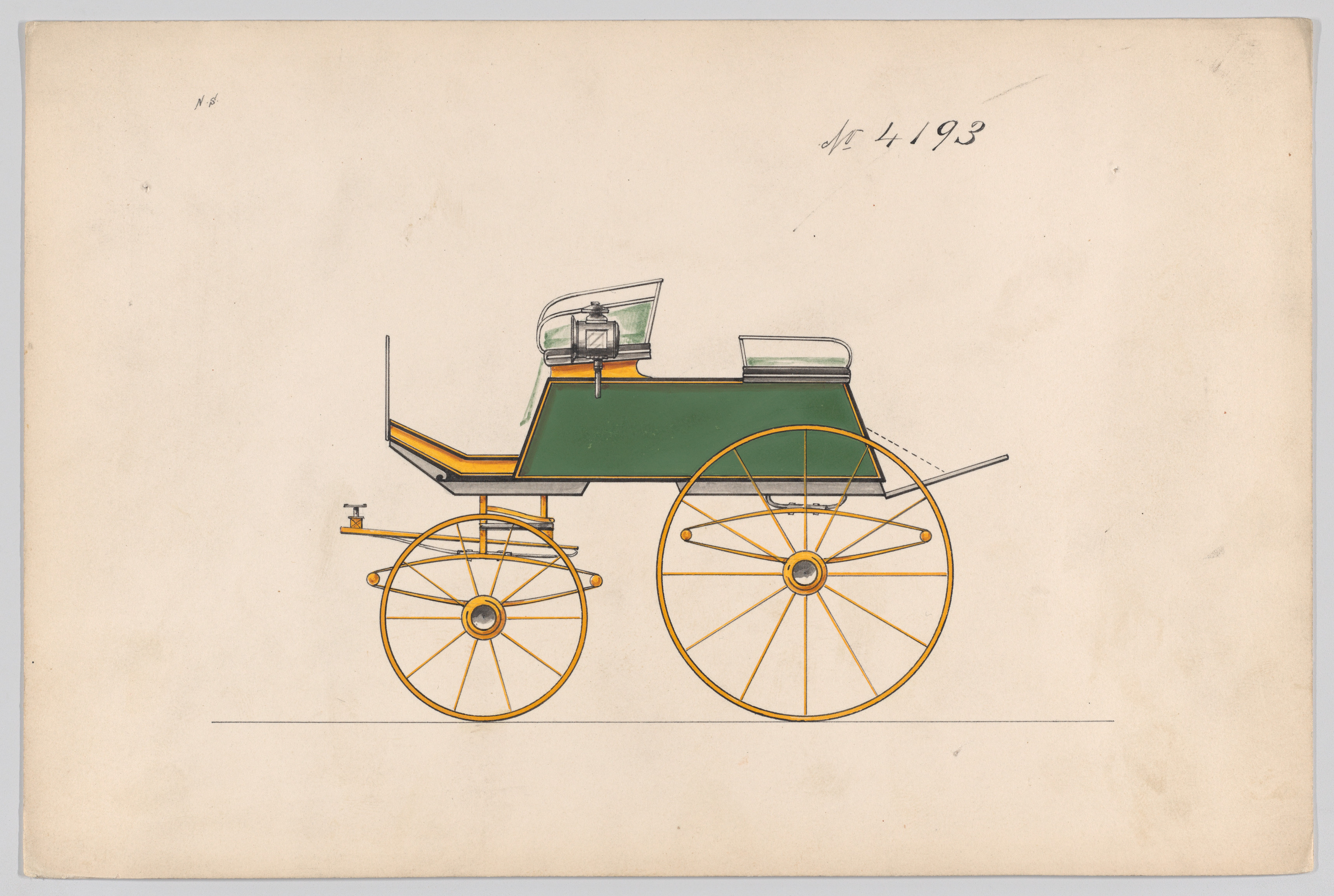
Four-wheel trap design

The name trap, short for "trapdoor cart", came about as an informal name from gigs, specifically dogcart gigs, which had a trapdoor for the compartment under the seat where hunting dogs were transported. The dogcart vehicle was built with a seat facing forward and a second seat facing backward—passengers riding dos-à-dos (back-to-back). The trapdoor would be let down as a footrest for the rear-facing passengers, and the cart got the name trap by omitting the word door. The name continued when the usual two-wheeled dogcarts were made with four wheels while retaining the back-to-back seating and trapdoor footrest.

In the US, where four-wheeled vehicles were more common, there were many seating innovations, and carriagebuilders competed for sales by making frequent model changes. Some of the back-to-back seats were adjustable and the rear seat could be turned around so both seats were facing forward. Sometimes half of the front seat would be able to flip up, giving access for passenger to reach the rear seat. This arrangement caused speculation that the name trap was because the rear passengers would be "trapped" until let out. The name "trap" became common and many carriagebuilders marketed their models as "traps" whether or not they had reversible seats or tailgates. Dozens of patents were issued using the name "trap".

Berkebile notes that in America, the vehicles that came to be known as "traps" were previously known as dos-à-dos, sliding-seat wagon or carriage, dog cart phaeton, four-wheel dogcart, and dogcart. Smith notes there were several American four-wheeled trap models by the names Amesbury trap, cut-under trap, Essex trap, and the wagonette trap. The wagonnette trap had seats that could be adjusted for the rear passengers to face each other in the same manner as a wagonette.

== See also ==
- Horse-drawn vehicle
