= Ralli car =

Two-wheeled horse drawn cart

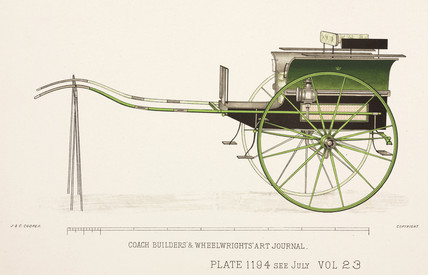
1903 design of a Ralli car showing the vehicle's characteristic outward-curving sides

A Ralli car (occasionally rally cart) is a British horse-drawn cart with outward flaring sides, built similarly to a dogcart.

== Design ==
The Ralli car is a light two-wheeled vehicle drawn by a single horse or pony and having a crosswise seat for two people facing forward, and usually another seat facing rearward. Its key feature is that the sides curve up and outwards over the wheels to make splashboards, using a steam bending process. The shafts continue to the rear of the body, either inside or outside the bodywork, and the body is hung on springs. It has storage under the seat, and was common in Britain as a family run-around vehicle.

== Variations ==
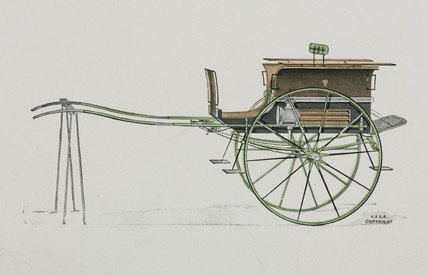
This Ralli car design has back-to-back seating and a fold-down tailboard.

Though the Ralli car was typically constructed with two side springs, variations included using cee-springs, semi-elliptic springs, and Dennett springs.

A Ralli-dogcart was a sporting variation with back-to-back seating. Another back-to-back version is the Morovi car. A Craven cart is a pony-sized version of the Ralli car with back-to-back seating, a tailboard that let down in the back for the rear passengers' feet, and some caning on the sides.

The Welsh Ralli car has slatted sides.

The four-wheeled Ralli car was configured like four-wheeled dogcart with the flared body of a Ralli car.

== Historical context ==
The vehicle was introduced in 1885 by C. S. Windover, and was named after the first purchaser, the Ralli family who lived in Ashtead Park. Berkebile notes that the vehicle was "brought prominently into public notice by a patent law suit". In Britain, the word car was used to indicate a better type of vehicle than a mere cart. The Ralli car was nicknamed a 'clothes basket', as were other vehicles with wickerwork.
