= Municipal horse =

Horse doing public service tasks for local French authority

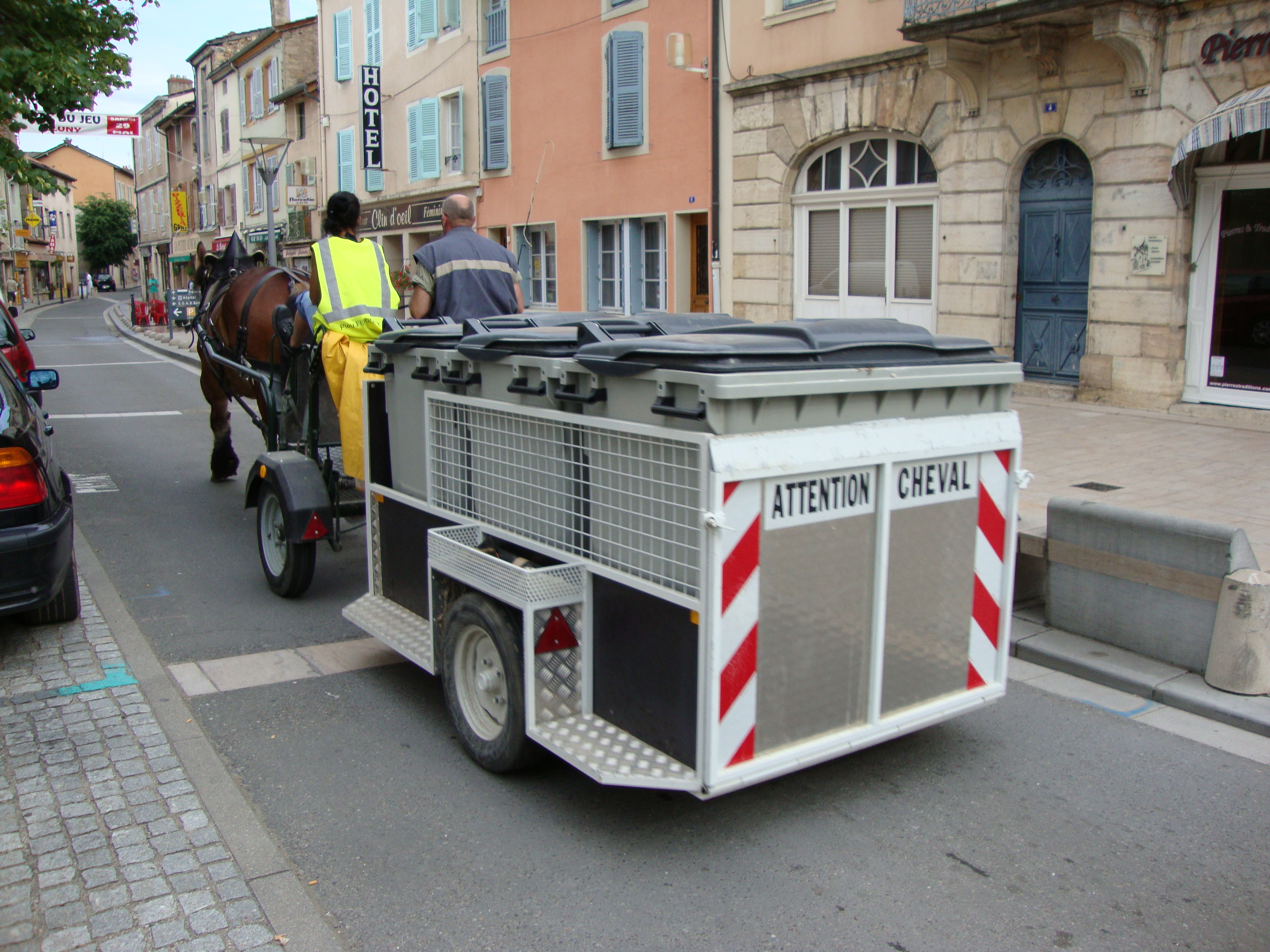
Municipal horse and coachman collecting garbage in Cluny.

In France, a municipal horse (French: cheval territorial) is a horse utilized for various public service tasks on behalf of a local authority. This approach aligns with sustainable development and ecological solutions, as it aims to preserve the authenticity of the sites involved. The commune of Saint-Pierre-sur-Dives was a pioneer in this practice, introducing the mare "Uranie" in 1993. The commune of Trouville-sur-Mer organizes an annual congress and leads the national municipal horse commission (la commission nationale des chevaux territoriaux). In 2012, the role of coachman formally defined, and this profession was officially registered in the Répertoire national des métiers. As of 2015, approximately 300 communes of France employed one or more municipal horses. Their duties are diverse, typically involving tourism, waste management, maintenance of green spaces, safety and prevention, or personal transport.

Municipal horses have attracted interest among the public, contributing to connections between residents and municipal services. They serve as representations of the municipalities that employ them. While the use of horses may be considered traditional, some view them as more appealing than motorized vehicles due to their ecological benefits and potential for job creation, often at comparable or lower costs. However, horses necessitate a greater time investment for their care compared to motorized vehicles.

== Definition ==
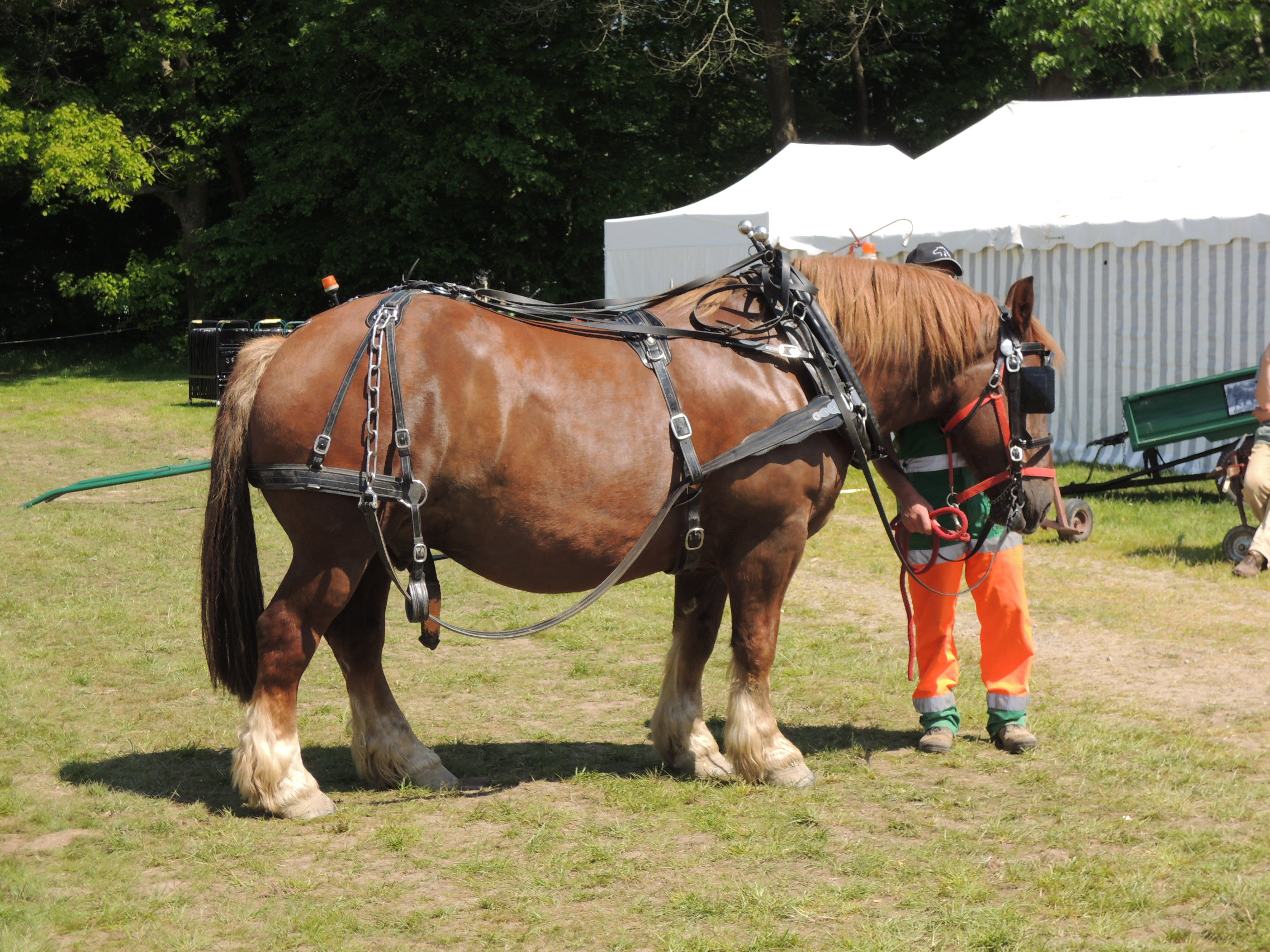
Touzic Ar Maner, Breton gelding, municipal horse of the Parc des Gayeulles in Rennes.

Various names have been used for the municipal horse, including cheval cantonnier, cheval citadin, cheval communal, and cheval citoyen. A symposium held in Avignon in 2000 focused on the theme of "the horse in the city." The term "municipal horse" was officially adopted during the first Congrès national des chevaux territoriaux in Trouville-sur-Mer in 2003. In late 2012, a report by the Conseil général de l'alimentation, de l'agriculture et des espaces ruraux (CGAAER) defined the term as "a horse used by a local authority (either independently or as a service provider) to carry out public service missions in its territory, such as passenger transport, waste collection, maintenance of green spaces or natural areas, and prevention and security". In Switzerland, the term "urban horse" is used. However, the concept of "municipal horse" remains challenging to define comprehensively.

== History ==
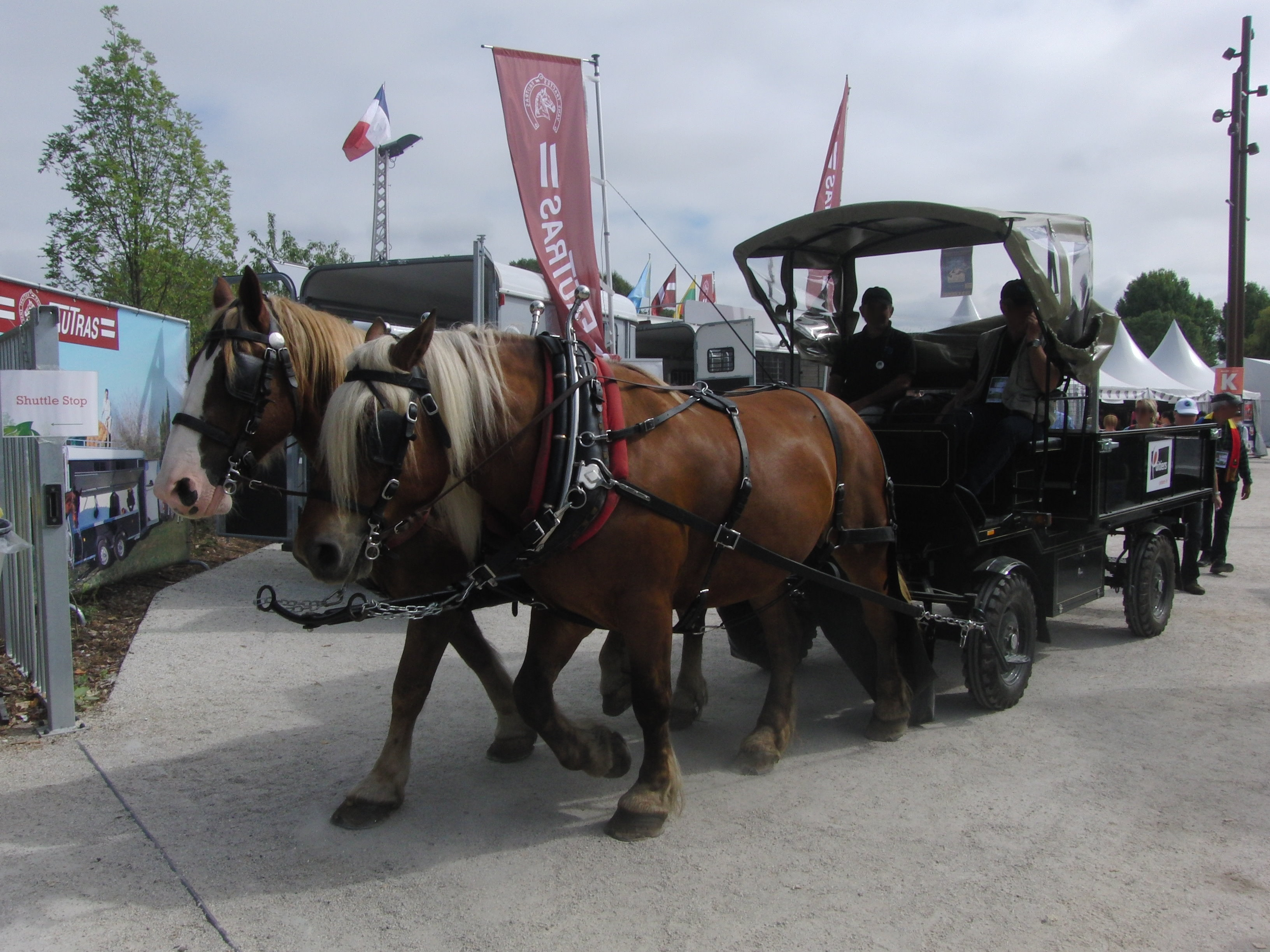
Garbage collection with two municipal horses during the 2014 World Equestrian Games.

There is currently insufficient data to provide a comprehensive overview of the municipal horse and its related structures, as thorough investigations have not been conducted. Historically, French communes utilized horses for various tasks before the rise of motor vehicles. The modernization of transportation in the 20th century led to a decline in the use of working animals in France. Pierre Rabhi described this shift as a "rupture," highlighting society's reliance on oil and its disconnection from the earth.

The concept of municipal horses emerged from sustainable development ideas popularized in the 1990s, coinciding with a gradual reintroduction of horses into agricultural practices. The initiative began with the town council of Saint-Pierre-sur-Dives, a rural commune closely associated with the Percheron draught horse. Since 1993, Bruno Rible has employed a grey mare named "Uranie" for municipal tasks such as garbage collection, cleaning gutters, and providing carriage rides for children. This initiative received official recognition in 1995 and garnered significant media attention.

Following this example, several pioneering communes began to adopt municipal horses. In 1999 and 2000, Trouville-sur-Mer implemented a similar system to manage its glass waste, motivated by the lower costs of acquiring a horse compared to specialized motor vehicles and the desire to minimize disturbances in the tourist area. The commune introduced a five-year-old Percheron named Festival de Mai for this purpose. In 2003, Trouville-sur-Mer hosted the first national municipal horse congress. That year, Haras Nationaux commissioned a Sofres survey to assess public perceptions of horses in urban areas. The findings indicated that the presence of horses contributes positively to the urban environment, enhancing its social and aesthetic appeal. As part of the "Horse and Territories" initiative, Haras Nationaux analyzed various community projects involving horses in 2005.

Since the 2000s, an increasing number of French communes have established and expanded public horse-drawn services. This trend led to the creation of a municipal horse championship in 2009, which included participation from 70 communes, and the formation of a national municipal horse commission in 2011. Currently, over a hundred communities utilize at least one horse for public service. By the end of 2012, approximately 200 communes either had a municipal horse or were planning to acquire one. The French government has tasked the CGAAER with analyzing this phenomenon to evaluate the potential for further development of municipal horses. Interest from mayors was evident in November 2013, and by October 2015, around 300 communes were using a municipal horse, whether on an occasional or year-round basis. The popularity of these initiatives prompted the Centre national de la fonction publique territoriale and the Institut français du cheval et de l'équitation to organize several "equi-meetings" in 2015 and 2016. These meetings aimed to review existing projects and assist municipalities interested in establishing their own horse-drawn services.

Additionally, to promote and preserve the Breton horse breed, the Brittany region launched a call for projects in September 2013, offering financial support for initiatives involving Breton horses. This call for projects has been renewed annually, with between 8 and 12 Breton communities responding each year. The initiative allows for the evaluation or implementation of activities related to the Breton draft horse. Each year, the Faire à cheval network produces a report assessing projects initiated two years prior to track changes in community usage and highlight key factors contributing to the success of these initiatives.

== Missions ==
A municipal horse can undertake a variety of missions, including mounted police, domestic waste collection, and awareness-raising on selective sorting, transport of people (schools, tourism, and the elderly), maintenance of green spaces (lawn mowing, watering vegetation, logging), maintenance of protected natural sites, herd surveillance, and social actions.

=== Waste collection and maintenance ===
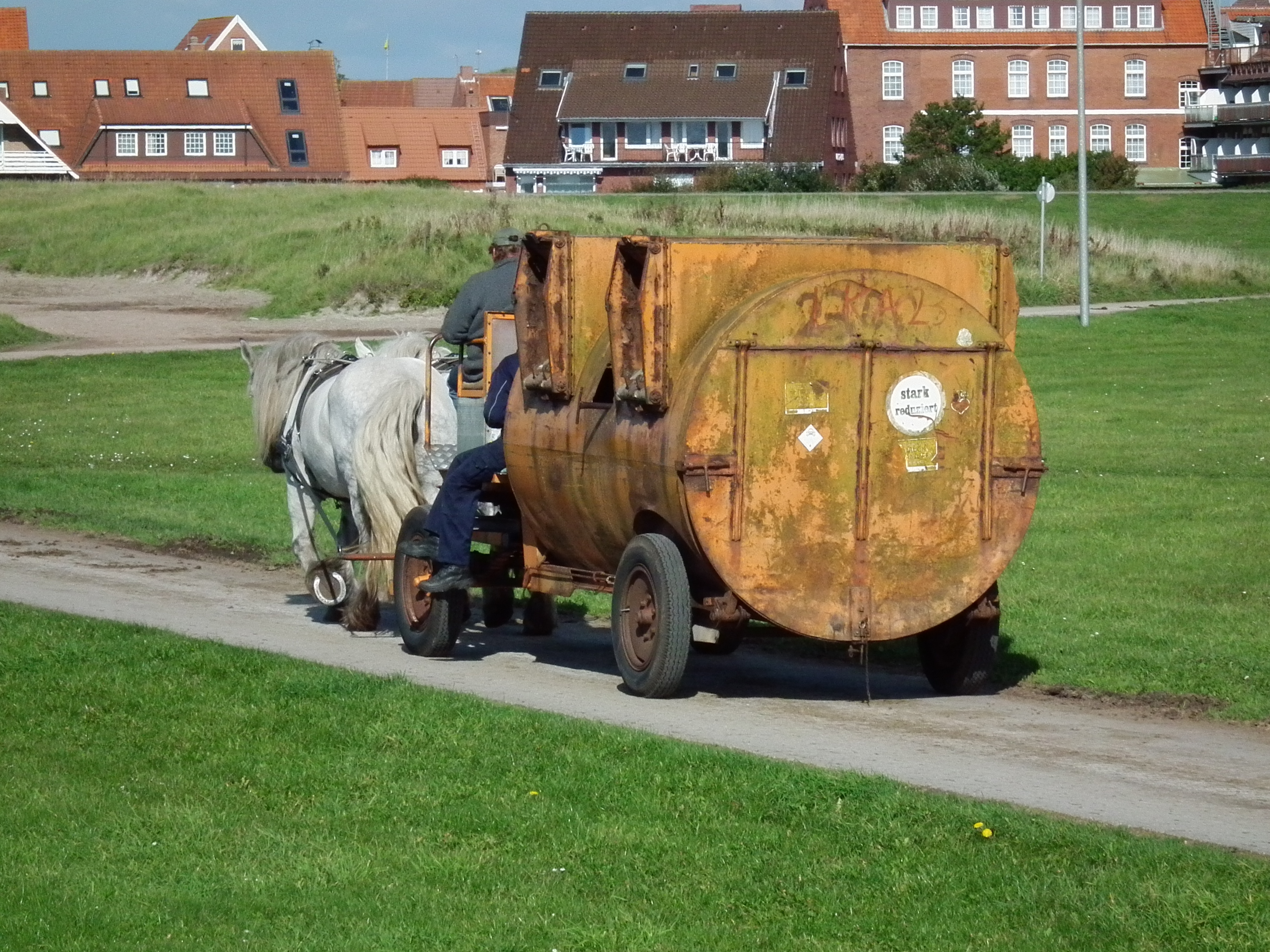
Horse-drawn transport of a waste container, Germany.

The use of horses for waste collection has various applications, including the collection of household waste, special waste from selective sorting (such as batteries, glass, and cardboard), and the emptying of litter bins in streets and parks. The presence of horses can facilitate communication with the public about waste sorting and management, often resulting in higher recovery rates. Horse-drawn vehicles enable effective door-to-door collection for both private and commercial customers, and seasonal collection schemes may be organized for events such as Christmas markets or the disposal of used Christmas trees. Horse-drawn waste collection is noted for its potential to enhance awareness, particularly among children, and increases the visibility of the waste collection personnel. Some reports suggest that workers may feel more motivated and productive when working with horses. Additionally, horses can navigate narrow or steep streets more efficiently than motorized vehicles, making them suitable for short-distance tasks with frequent stops. However, public acceptance of using horses for waste collection remains low, with a significant percentage of the population expressing opposition, as indicated by a 2003 Kantar TNS poll. Local authorities also face challenges in adapting staff and equipment for this type of service.

In some instances, horses or donkeys are employed for mechanical scanning, collection, upkeep, and lightweight maintenance of urban equipment, including pavements, sidewalks, and signposts, as well as maintaining paths and beaches. Horses can access hard-to-reach areas and serve as a complement to motorized vehicles.

=== Maintenance of nature and green areas ===
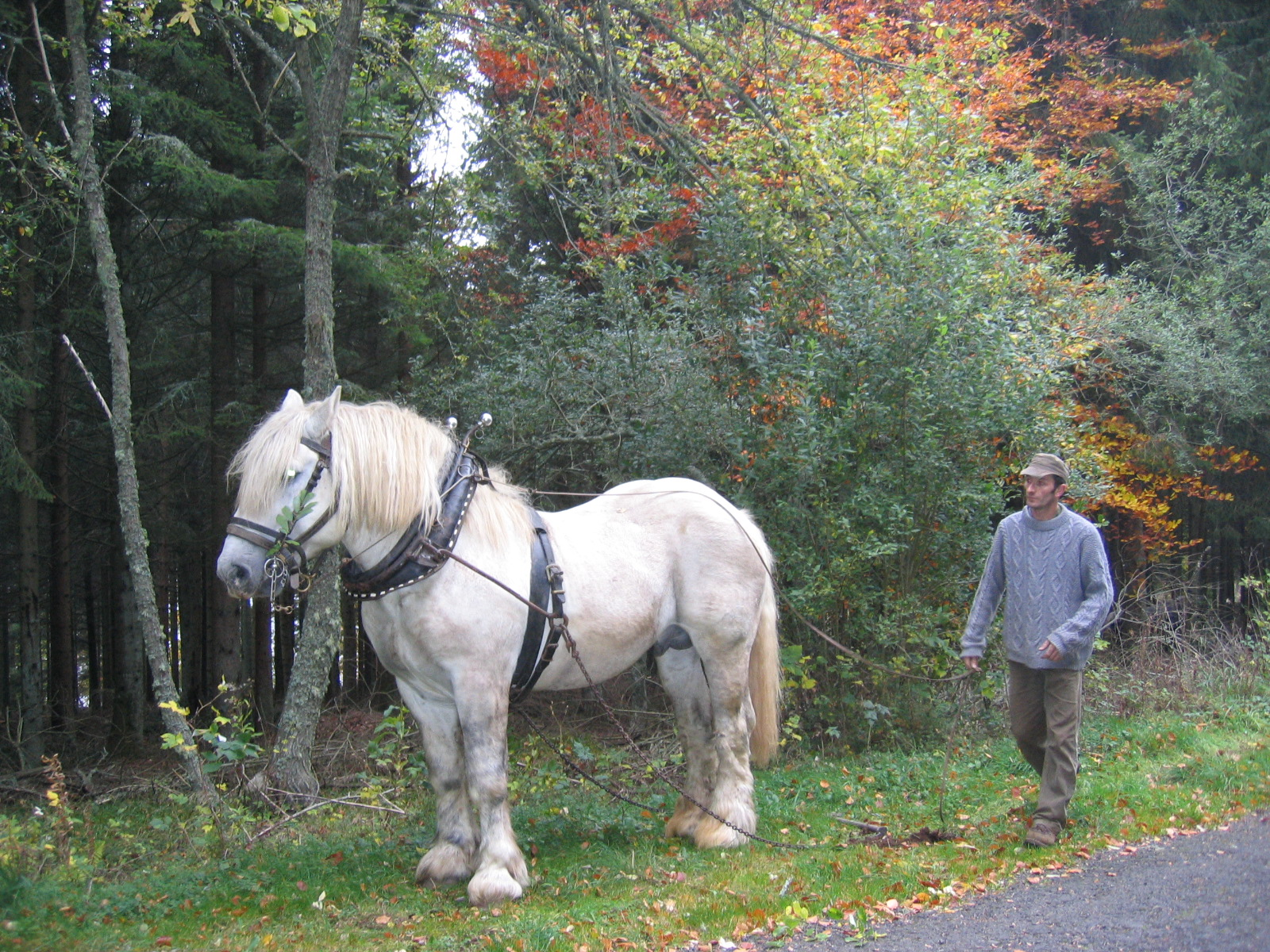
Draught horse skidding in Haute-Loire.

Horses are particularly well-suited for work in green spaces and sensitive natural areas, such as wetlands, unstable or sloping terrain, rivers, hiking trails, regional or national parks, and forests managed by the National Forests Office. Their tasks may include skidding, portaging, and other forestry-related functions. The organized nature of the French equestrian industry provides an advantage, as it ensures that workers possess the necessary training, skills, and equipment. The ecological benefits of using horses are significant, as they do not cause soil compaction, disturb local flora or fauna, or introduce pollutants such as hydrocarbons into the environment. Horses offer greater flexibility and maneuverability compared to motorized vehicles, enabling them to navigate challenging terrains, including rivers and slopes, often at a lower operational cost. However, motorized vehicles tend to be faster and more efficient, making horses comparatively slower.

In urban parks and green spaces, horses have a wide range of applications, including watering and irrigating planters and flowerbeds, maintaining paths and embankments, planting and tending to flowerbeds, collecting litter, and performing various activities such as rides and educational programs. They can also be utilized in conservation grazing initiatives. Horses are favored for transportation and recreational activities in parks and gardens, and their use is compatible with Natura 2000 zones and historic sites, enhancing the visitor experience. While horses can effectively carry out daily park activities, challenges remain in acquiring equipment specifically designed for horse-related tasks.

=== Municipal transport ===
Several municipalities have introduced horse-drawn transportation for schools, catering to both regular commutes in rural areas with small student populations and special excursions. This initiative has been well received by children, who appreciate the presence of horses and are often more motivated to attend school. It also serves as a pedagogical tool, providing opportunities to educate students about equine nutrition, farriery, and care. However, the use of horse-drawn transportation for school purposes faces significant regulatory and safety limitations, as well as logistical challenges.

In addition to school transport, there are initiatives that provide horse-drawn services for elderly individuals traveling to retirement clubs, utilizing cabs and horse-drawn buses, with or without fees. This form of transportation raises considerations regarding the establishment of horse-drawn parking areas, traffic management, and ensuring accessibility for individuals with disabilities.

=== Protection and monitoring ===
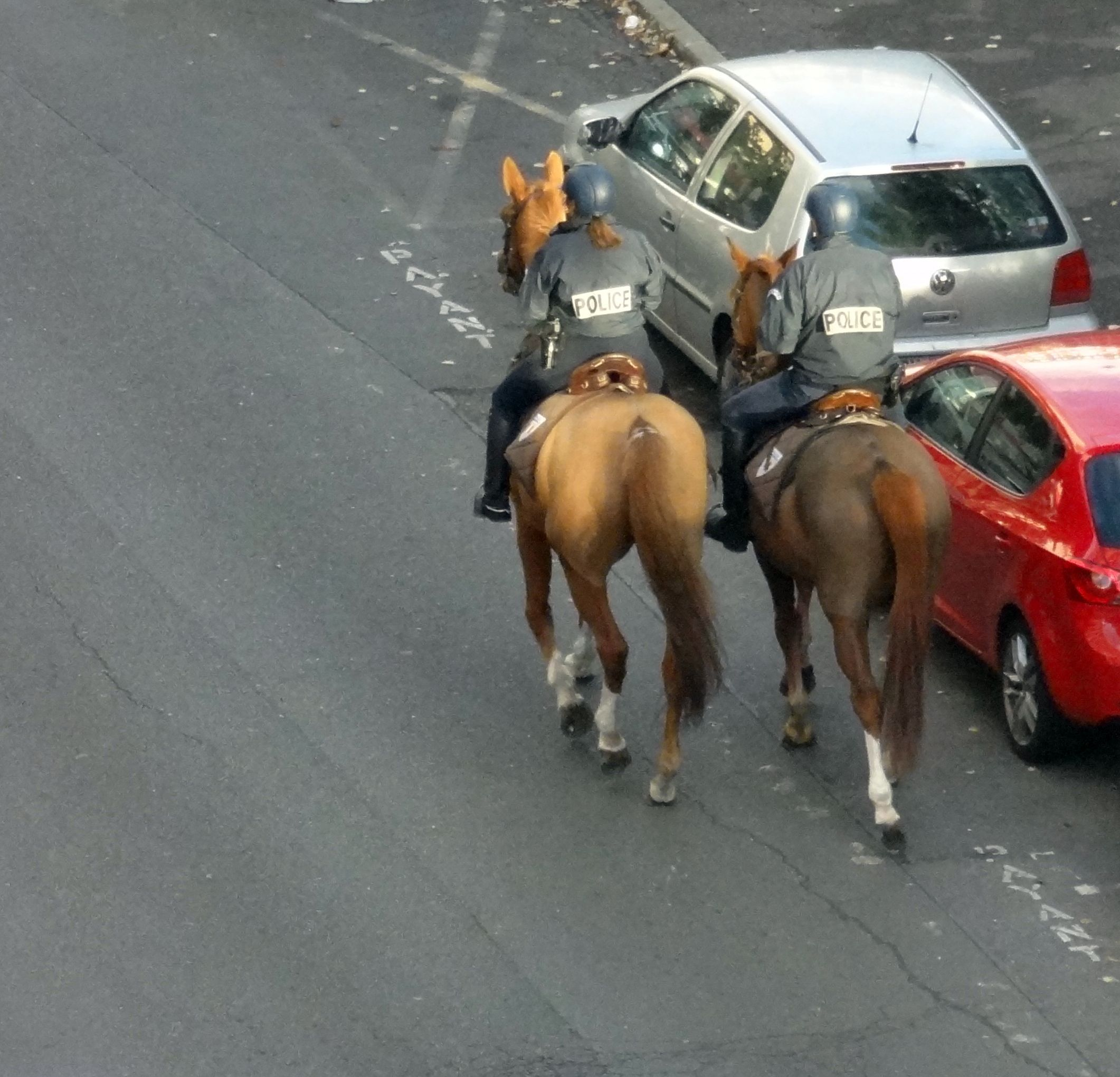
French mounted police patrol in Bagnolet.

Protection and surveillance operations involving municipal horses can be either permanent or seasonal, often carried out by Eco-guards or municipal police officers. These initiatives are valued for the discreet, deterrent, and approachable presence of law enforcement on horseback, which allows for effective surveillance over large areas from an elevated position. The use of mounted officers has been shown to be effective in preventing crime. Public support for this practice is substantial, with 82% of French citizens expressing approval for the use of horseback officers in securing public spaces. However, challenges remain, including limitations in training, the selection of suitable animals and personnel, and considerations for the well-being of horses during urban missions, which can complicate the implementation of these operations.

=== Tourism ===
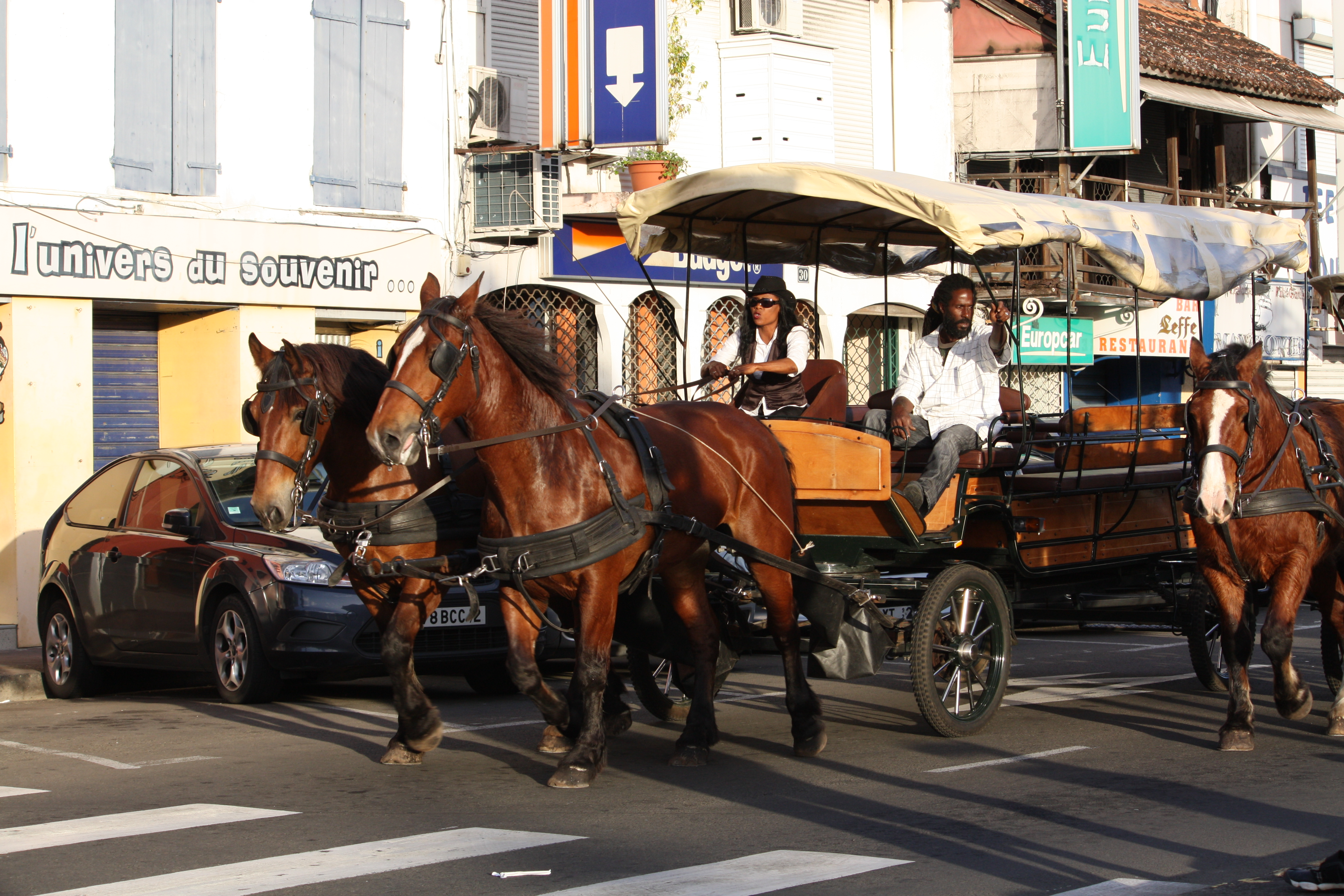
Tourist horse-drawn carriage driving in Fort-de-France, Martinique.

Tourism plays a significant role in the initiatives involving municipal horses, with 85% of French horse-drawn transport associated with this sector, according to 2015 data. This trend reflects both the high volume of tourist activity in France and the growing preference among visitors for a slower, more immersive vacation experience. Many major tourist sites have established horse-drawn shuttles to transport visitors to heritage locations while preserving the surrounding landscape. Some programs also allow tourists without prior equestrian experience to ride horses for the first time. Additionally, there are plans to develop horse-drawndrawn wine tourism, as horse-drawn carriages are particularly well-suited for tours of vineyards.

Public reception of horse-drawn tourism is favorable, with 79% of French respondents in a 2003 survey supporting the use of horses for city tours.

=== Social actions and integration ===
Municipal horses can also play a role in rehabilitation programs for individuals with disabilities, a practice supported by 90% of the French population. This initiative can promote employment opportunities for disabled or marginalized individuals and help mitigate social conflicts. However, it faces challenges, including regulatory constraints, the potential for unsuccessful outcomes, and issues related to professionalism in implementation.

=== List of missions by commune ===
Many municipalities promote the activities of their municipal horses.

Place	Implementation date	Missions	Specifications	Sources
Saint-Pierre-sur-Dives (Calvados)	1993–2014	School and garbage collection with a Percheron mare: "Uranie", then "Pola".	At the recommendation of the deputy mayor, the service was terminated in September 2014 by order of the mayor's office.
Parc des Gayeulles, Rennes (Ille-et-Vilaine)	1993 – in progress	Garbage collection and skidding with a Breton horse: "Duchesse", then "Touzic Ar Maner" from the 28th.	One of Brittany's longest-standing experiences with the municipal horse.
Rambouillet (Yvelines)	June 1994	Cleaning with two Boulonnais, "Eurêka" and "Beauminois"
Bois de Vincennes (Val-de-Marne)	1998 – in progress	Green space maintenance with Ardennais, "Jason", "Idéal" and "Rapido".
Montélimar (Drôme)	July 8, 1998 – in progress	Equestrian Brigade with three horses, "Cisco", "Ripio" and "Kamel".	One of France's oldest equestrian brigades.
Trouville-sur-Mer (Calvados)	2000–2016	Glass collection, watering flower boxes, mowing, school pick-up. The team includes a Percheron, "Festival de mai", who has since retired.	Set up by Olivier Linot, general manager of Trouville Services and President of the National Federation of Municipal Horses.
La Roche-sur-Yon (Vendée)	Late 2002	Equestrian brigade for policing and nature conservation. Two municipal horses.	At the suggestion of Jacques Auxiette, with the collaboration of the Haras de la Vendée.
Communauté de Communes du Canton de Criquetot-l'Esneval (Seine-Maritime)	2004	Waste collection and maintenance of green spaces	Thanks to the collaboration of the communauté de communes' general services manager and the Haras Nationaux.
Beauvais (Oise)	Summer 2005 for the Municipal Brigade a 1st for draught horses	Equestrian Brigade Waste collection	At the suggestion of the "Traits de Génie" and "Equiterra" draft horse associations.
Vendargues (Hérault)	In progress	Equestrian Brigade Waste collection School transport
Parc de la Tête d'or, Lyon (Rhône)	September 2006	Waste collection with three Comtois horses
Parc de la Chantrerie, Nantes (Loire-Atlantique)	November 7, 2006	Basket collection and skidding with "Princesse", a Breton mare
Cambrai (Nord)	2008 – in progress	Collection of used Christmas trees	Seasonal service
Cluny (Saône-et-Loire)	2009 – in progress	Waste collection with an Auxois from the Haras Nationaux	Partnership between the town of Cluny, the inter-municipal union for the collection and treatment of household waste, and the Haras National de Cluny.
Mably (Loire)	April 2009 – in progress	Maintenance of green spaces and waste collection with "Scoubidou", a Comtois draught horse
La Chapelle-Gaceline (Morbihan)	January 2010 – in progress	School collection, cleaning and flowering with two Bretons, "Nayak" and "Opérat".
Hazebrouck (Nord)	February 2011 – December 21, 2015	Waste collection	An initiative by Veolia, which was collaborating with SMICTOM to develop specialized equipment for testing a new business model, ceased operations in 2015 due to budgetary constraints.
Questembert (Morbihan)	October 2010 – in progress	Waste collection with a Breton horse, "Napoléon".	The decision to use a horse for garbage collection was based on the challenge posed by narrow streets that impeded the use of a regular garbage truck.
Sciez (Haute-Savoie)		Maintenance of the flowerbeds and green spaces and garbage collection with an Ardennes horse.	Use of a custom-built horse-drawn carriage
Mâcon (Saône-et-Loire)	2012 – in progress	Equestrian Brigade	Seasonal, April to October
Tarascon (Bouches-du-Rhône)	2012 – in progress	Waste collection, maintenance of green spaces, outside services with Luth and Luxor (retired) replaced by Sucette and Sirène.	Chantier d'insertion ACTUS Association Chevaux de Traits d'Union Sociale (Social Union Draft Horses Association)
Valence (Drôme)	2012–2014	Equestrian Brigade	Removed for cost and horse welfare reasons.
Arques (Pas-de-Calais)	2015	Collection of used Christmas trees	Seasonal service
Saint-Martin-de-Crau (Bouches-du-Rhône)	2019 – in progress	Waste collection, maintenance of green spaces, outside services with Fée et Fanny.	Chantier d'insertion ACTUS Association Chevaux de Traits d'Union Sociale (Social Union Draft Horses Association)
Tours (Indre-et-Loire)	In progress	Equestrian Brigade	Horses are fitted with special shoes to prevent them from slipping on the cobbles.
Orléans (Loiret)	In progress	Equestrian Brigade	Patrols limited to the Orléans-la-Source district

== Implementation ==
Implementing a municipal horse program typically depends on the active involvement of motivated elected officials and requires collaboration among a diverse range of public, associative, and private stakeholders. This cooperative effort aims to optimize costs and successfully bring the project to fruition, often involving a phase of experimentation and trial and error. The Commission nationale de développement des chevaux territoriaux, based in Trouville-sur-Mer, organizes an annual congress to facilitate discussions and share best practices. Various associations of animal traction professionals in France, such as Traits de génie, Trait d'avenir, CIVAM, PROMMATA, and Hippotese, also contribute by offering advice and facilitating knowledge exchange. At European level, CERRTA (Centre européen de ressources et de recherche en traction animale) serves as an accredited training center for draught horse activities, while the FECTU (Fédération européenne du cheval de trait pour la promotion de son use), founded in 2003, promotes cooperation in the use of draught horses across Europe.

Key components of establishing a municipal horse program include training the horses, training the coachmen, and building or acquiring the necessary horse-drawn equipment. While the initial costs of purchasing horses and their equipment are generally lower than those for motorized vehicles, the overall cost of the mission can vary significantly depending on the organizational structure chosen by the municipality. Additionally, European subsidies, such as those from the European Regional Development Fund (ERDF), may be available to support the project's establishment.

=== Horse-drawn equipment ===
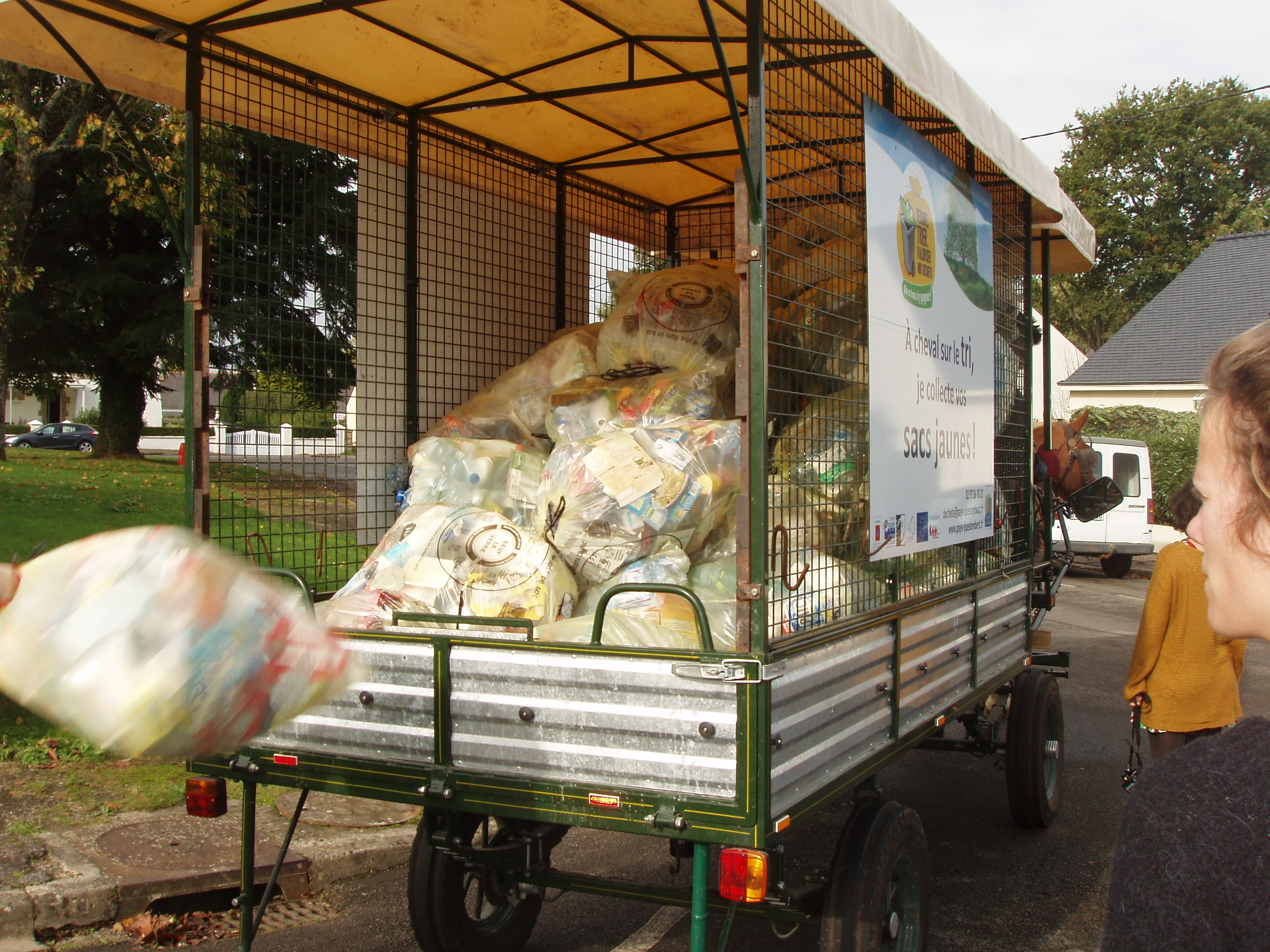
Horse-drawn trailer for waste collection in Questembert.

Finding suitable equipment for municipal horse programs can be challenging due to the decline of horse-drawn traction in France since the early 1900s. Many existing pieces of equipment have deteriorated over time and may not be suitable for modern municipal needs. Additionally, manufacturers of horse-drawn equipment are scarce and often operate on a small scale Recent advancements in the design of horse-drawn equipment have addressed some operational concerns. For instance, many carriage harnesses now include systems for collecting manure before it falls to the ground, and specialized horseshoes have been developed to reduce noise from hoof impacts.

Innovative horse-drawn equipment has also emerged to cater to specific municipal needs. In Pont-Sainte-Marie, a pink and green horse-drawn carriage known as "Funny Garden" is utilized for watering municipal plants. Similarly, Veolia has developed a horse-drawn carriage combining high technology and horse power.

=== Choice of coachman ===
The Syndicat National des Cochers Professionnels was created on April 12, 1999, to advocate for recognition of the coachman profession in France. This effort included the creation of the Diplôme de Cocher Professionnel, recognized by the French Ministry of Agriculture in 2002. At the end of 2012, a report by the Conseil général de l'alimentation, de l'agriculture et des espaces ruraux suggested that the profession be registered in the trade register to facilitate the recruitment of qualified professionals. The role of a coachman requires extensive practical knowledge, particularly in operating a carriage within urban environments and understanding the highway code applicable to horse-drawn vehicles. By 2012, the coachman profession represented 300 jobs in France.

== Reception ==
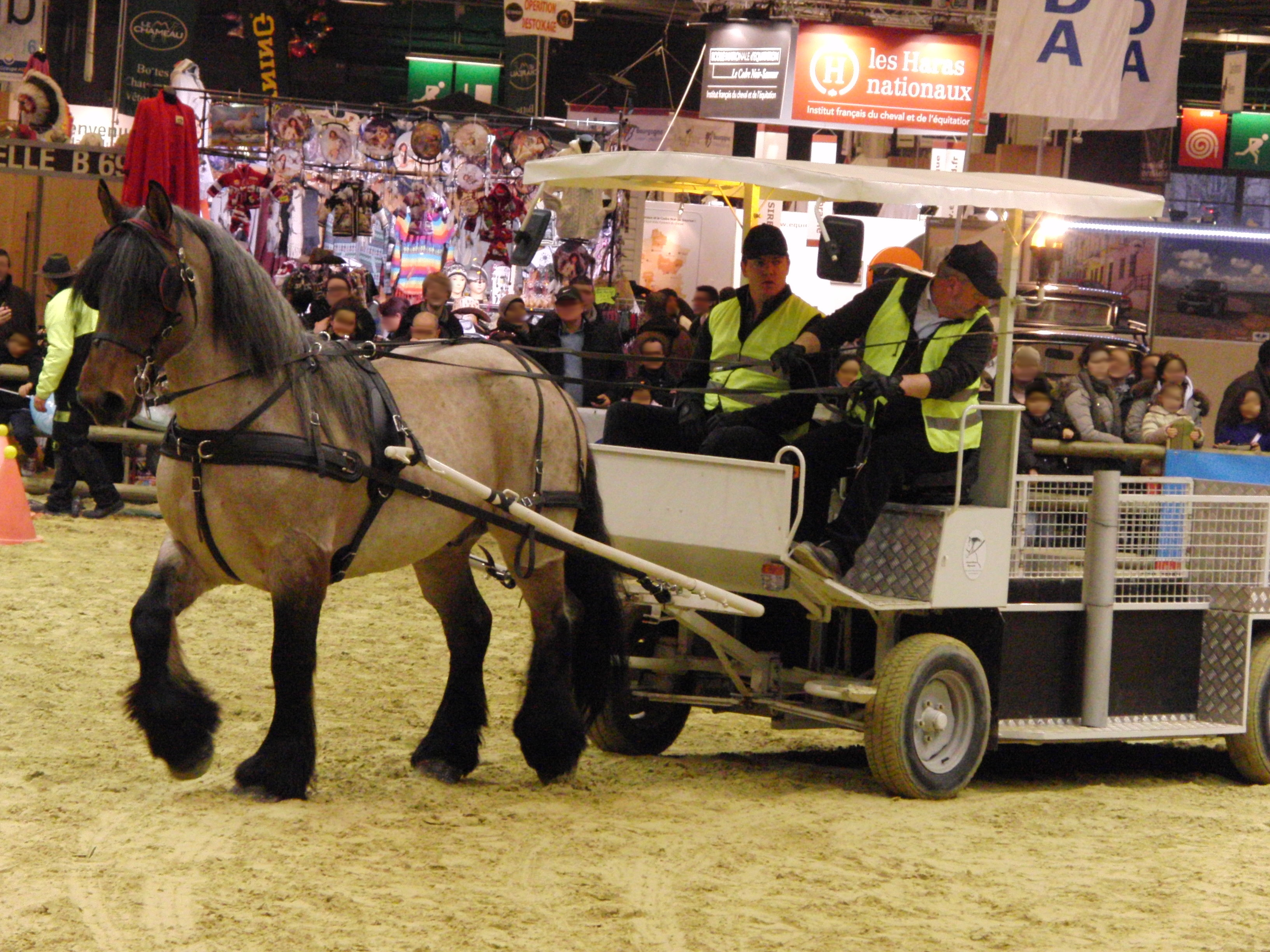
Poitevin horse harnessed during the Trait d'avenir attelage competition in the maneuverability event, representing the difficulties encountered by the municipal horse during its urban work. Salon international de l'agriculture 2013, Paris.

The reintroduction of municipal horses has received varied public reactions, with approximately 70% of French people expressing support for their use in public service roles, according to a 2003 survey by Kantar TNS MB. The export of this model is envisaged, particularly in Quebec, where horses are tending to disappear from cities. However, opinions vary regarding the potential for growth in this sector; some stakeholders believe it could expand rapidly in towns with populations over 2,000, while others view it as a niche initiative.

=== Advantages ===
In the context of sustainable development, municipal horses are recognized for their ecological efficiency, producing 35% less CO_{2} compared to trucks. They are generally more affordable to purchase and maintain, leading to quicker amortization of costs. The presence of municipal horses can strengthen connections between residents and local officials, as well as foster a sense of community between urban and rural areas. Horses also play a role in enhancing public awareness of ecological issues. In contexts such as mounted police, their presence can command respect for authority, may promote positive interactions, and serve as social mediators that promote environmental responsibility. The use of horses in protected natural areas allows for a more authentic experience without the disturbances typically associated with motorized vehicles, thereby improving the quality of life in those environments. Additionally, horses generate less noise than motorized transport, revitalizing community spaces. Their employment in traction applications supports the preservation of draught horse breeds, with many communities choosing to work with their heritage breeds, with many municipalities opting to work with heritage breeds. Ultimately, municipal horses tend to create more jobs compared to motorized vehicles, contributing to the identity and character of the communities in which they operate.

=== Disadvantages ===
The approach to using municipal horses has been described as "backward-looking" or "folkloristic," as noted in the 2012 CGAAER report". While the presence of horses in urban settings can evoke positive feelings, some elected officials view the implementation of mounted or harnessed public service missions as costly and time-consuming, leading to concerns about their overall effectiveness. This perspective has resulted in the discontinuation of mounted police teams in several cities, including Valence, Versailles, and Caen, between 2014 and 2015. Additionally, there are challenges related to skill adaptation. Although interest in working with horses is high among young people, the quality and relevance of training programs can vary significantly. Furthermore, the breeding of horses often does not align with the specific needs for public service roles, as breeders may prioritize different objectives, such as producing heavy horses for meat rather than draught horse suitable for municipal tasks. Safety concerns also arise from horse traffic in urban areas, requiring vigilance from those working with municipal horses to ensure public safety. These factors contribute to the ongoing debate about the viability and sustainability of municipal horse programs.

== Appendix ==
=== External links ===
- Official website archive, Fédération nationale des chevaux territoriaux.
- "Carte des chevaux territoriaux actifs en France" archive, on www.google.com
- "Documents, resources and videos on Horses in Towns and Green Spaces: Reports from the Territorial Horse Congresses" archive, Hippothèse.

=== Bibliography ===
- ^{(fr)} [CIVAM 2009] Guide pour l’use du cheval par les collectivités drômoises: Un outil pour répondre aux politiques de développement durable des collectivités territoriales, CIVAM, February 2009, 17 p. (read online archive)
- ^{(fr)} [Duriez and Fouquet 2012] Jean-Louis Duriez and Éric Fouquet, Évaluation du potentiel de développement du cheval territorial au plan national, Conseil général de l'alimentation, de l'agriculture et des espaces ruraux et Ministère de l'agriculture, de l'agroalimentaire et de la forêt, December 2012, 38 p. (read online archive)
- ^{(fr)} [Haras nationaux 2005] Cheval et territoires: L'énergie nouvelle du développement local, Les Haras nationaux, novembre 2005, 8 p.
- ^{(fr)} [Collectif 2011] Collectif, "Quand le cheval participe au dynamisme des territoires : panorama de démarches entreprises par des collectivités territoriales", REFErences, September 2011 (read online archive)
- ^{(fr)} [Linot and Simon 2014] Olivier Linot and Daniel Simon (pref. Marie Hélène Poitras), Le cheval au service de la ville: entretien avec Daniel Simon, Rue de l'échiquier, November 2014, 100 p. ISBN 978-2-89719-175-7
- ^{(fr)} À l'école des chevaux territoriaux [archive] [Television production] Equidia.
- ^{(fr)} [Tsaag Valren 2014] Amélie Tsaag Valren, "Chevaux territoriaux : histoire et perspectives d’avenir", Cheval Savoir, no 57, October 27th, 2014 (read online archive)
- ^{(fr)} [Verdun 2015] Aline Verdun, "Sabots verts sur macadam", Cheval Magazine, no 527, October 2015, p. 14-16 (ISSN 0245-3614)
