= Chasse-marée (cart) =

Type of French cart

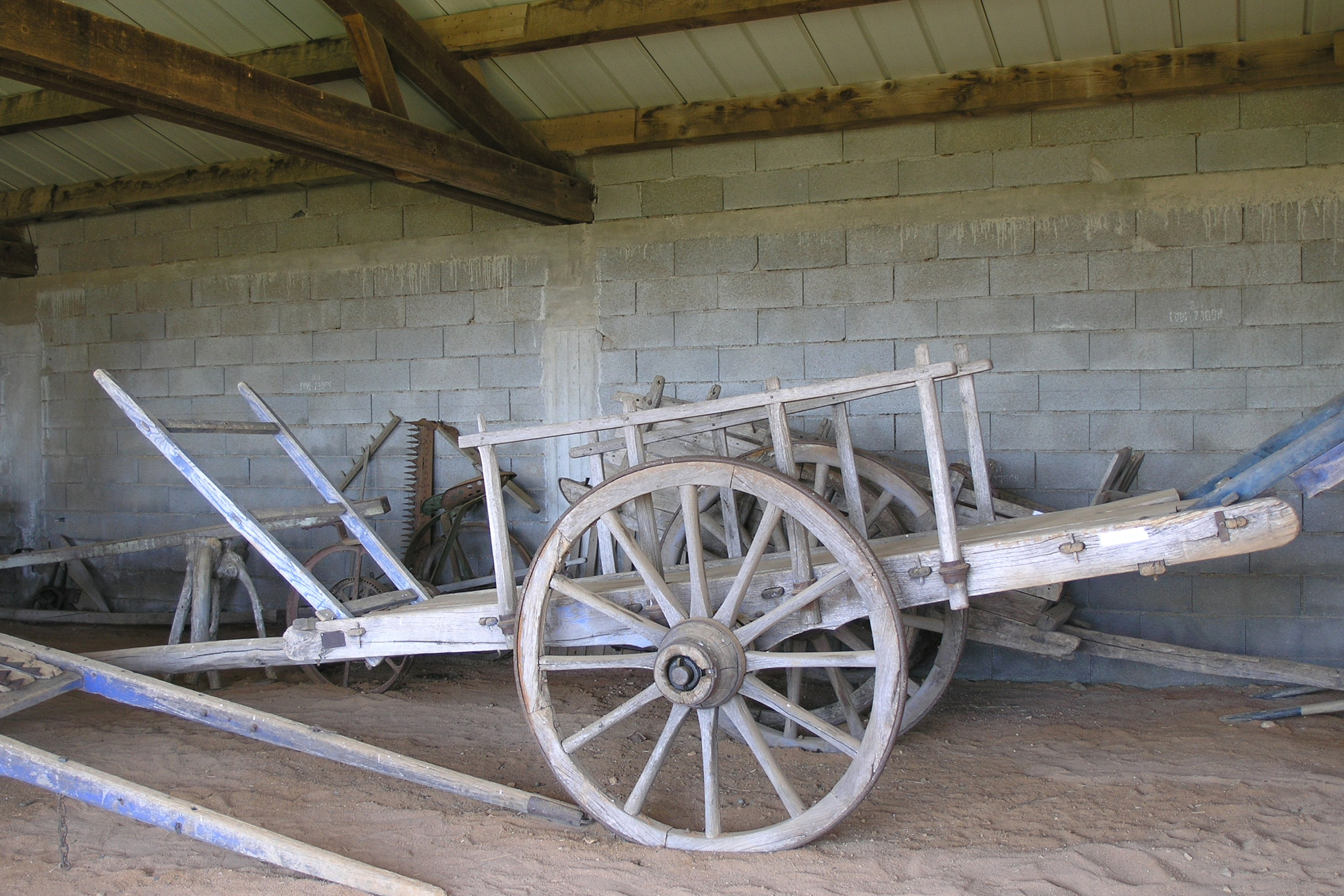
This is a charrette from the Cévennes in France. It is not a chasse-marée but the two types have much in common; the main difference being that here there are shafts for a single horse.

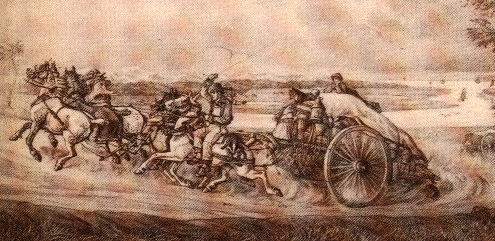
An 18th or 19th century lithograph

A chasse-marée is a cart from medieval France designed to carry baskets of fresh fish to inland markets, with a minimal structure and harnessing for four or more horses.

The medieval French chasse-marée merchants originally catered to the demand for fresh fish in inland markets by carrying fish in pairs of baskets on pack ponies, as far as possible, overnight. However, the distances they could reach before the fish deteriorated was limited.

Later, where the quality of the road permitted, the range was extended by the use of charrettes (carts). When designed for this trade, with a minimum of weight put into their construction and provision for harnessing four horses, these vehicles took the name of chasse-marée. As speed was essential, they were normally hauled by two pairs of horses rather than the single horse which is normal for a cart. The vehicle took the form of two wheels, of a diameter large enough to minimize the slowing effect of bumps in the road. On their axle was mounted an open rectangular frame within which were slung the baskets holding the fish, packed in seaweed. More baskets were stacked above. The teams of usually fairly small horses were worked hard and changed at posting stations in the same way as those of mail coaches.

The coast supplying Paris by road was originally, that which was nearest to its market, around Le Tréport and Saint-Valery-sur-Somme. At its most developed, it extended from Fécamp to Calais including such places as Dieppe, Boulogne-sur-Mer and Étaples.

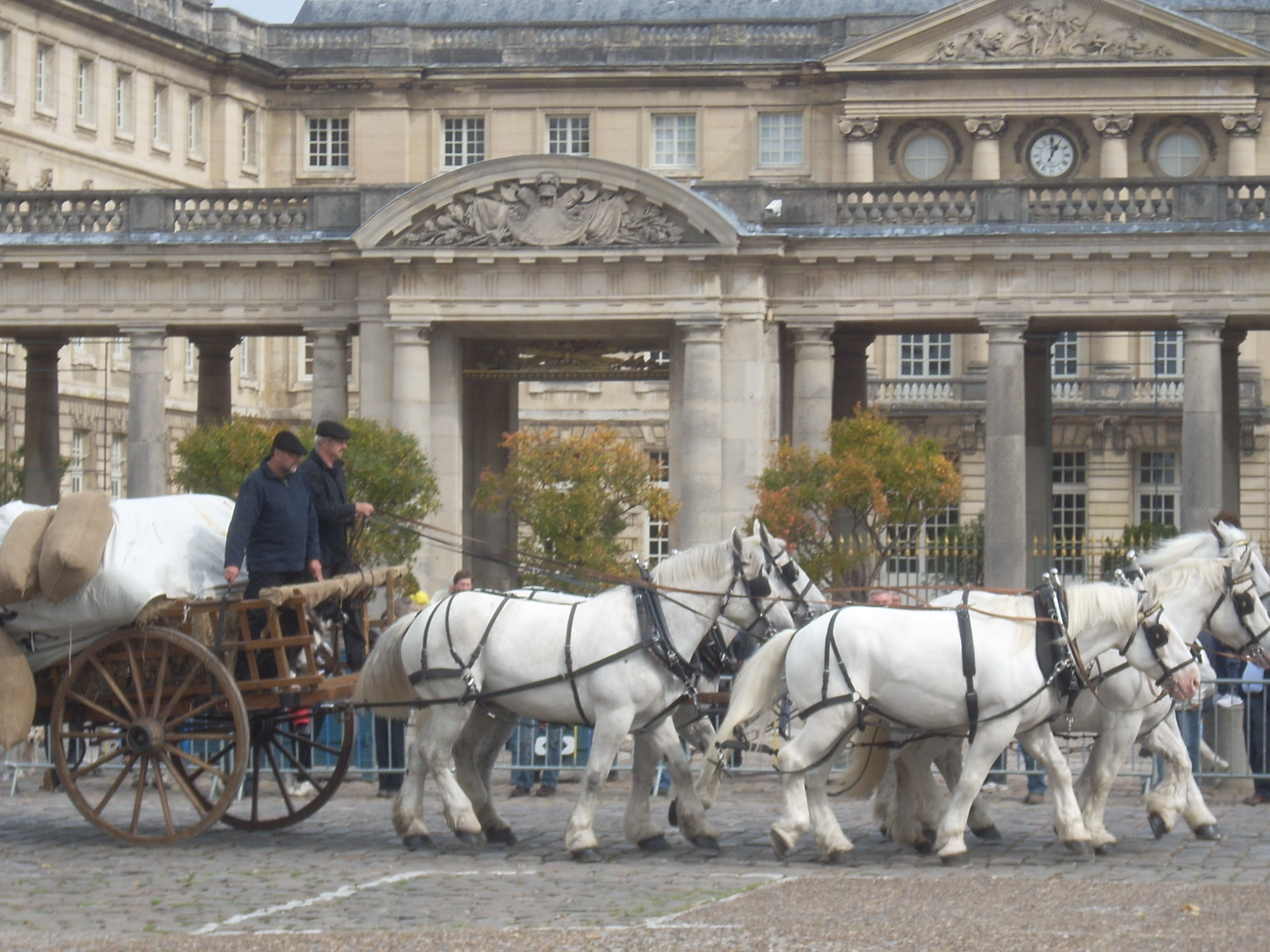
From the 2012 race

After 600 years in operation, the railroads put it out of business in the mid-1800s. The Route du Poisson horse driving endurance race recreated the 24-hour dash from seashore to Paris, though as a multiple-day relay race. It ran every few years from 1991 to 2012 and revived in 2022.

== See also ==
- La Route du Poisson
