= Dogcart =

Type of wheeled open carriage

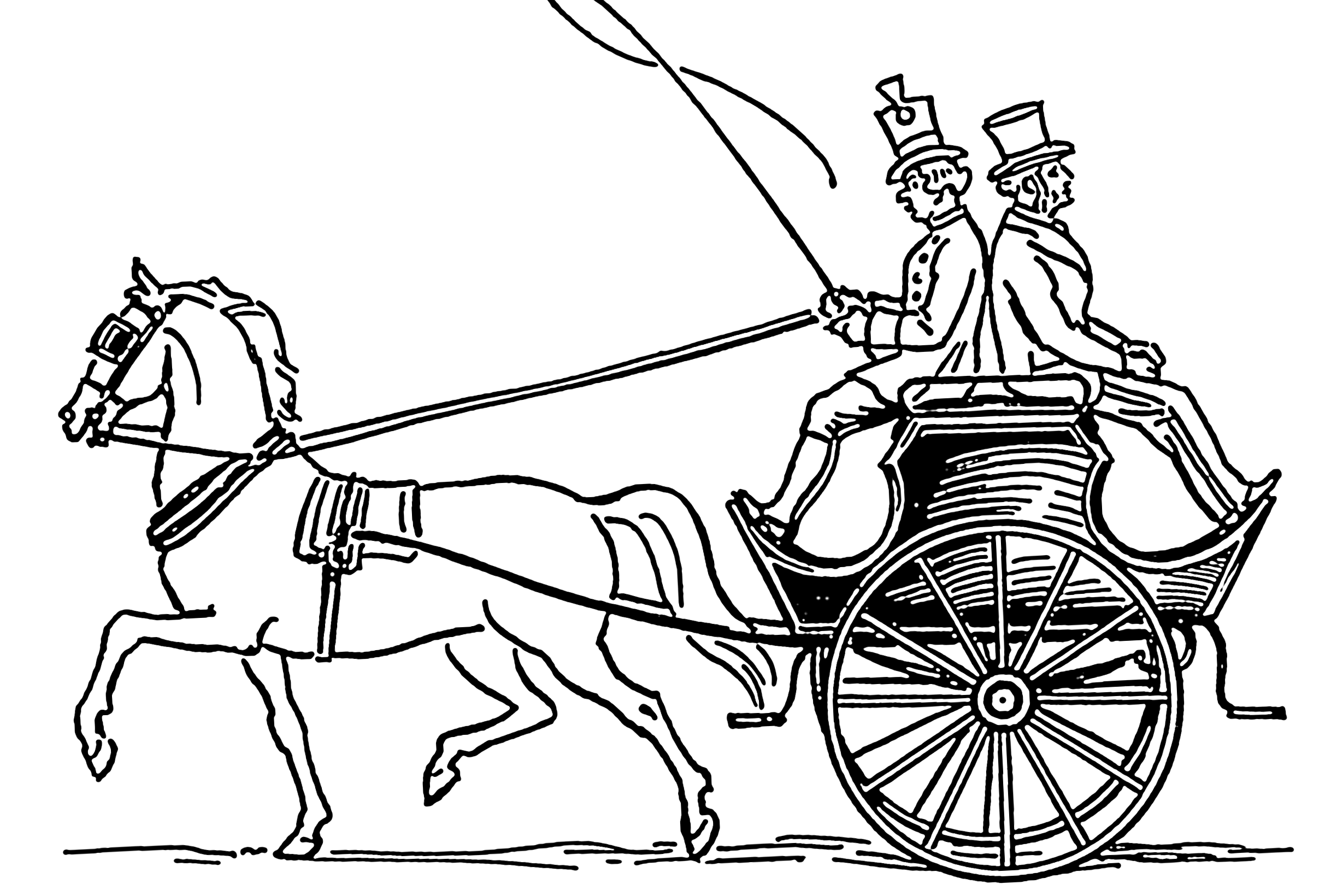
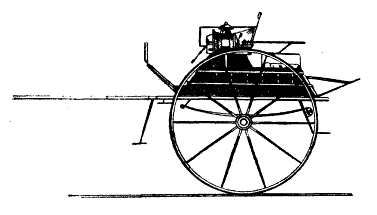
Dogcarts

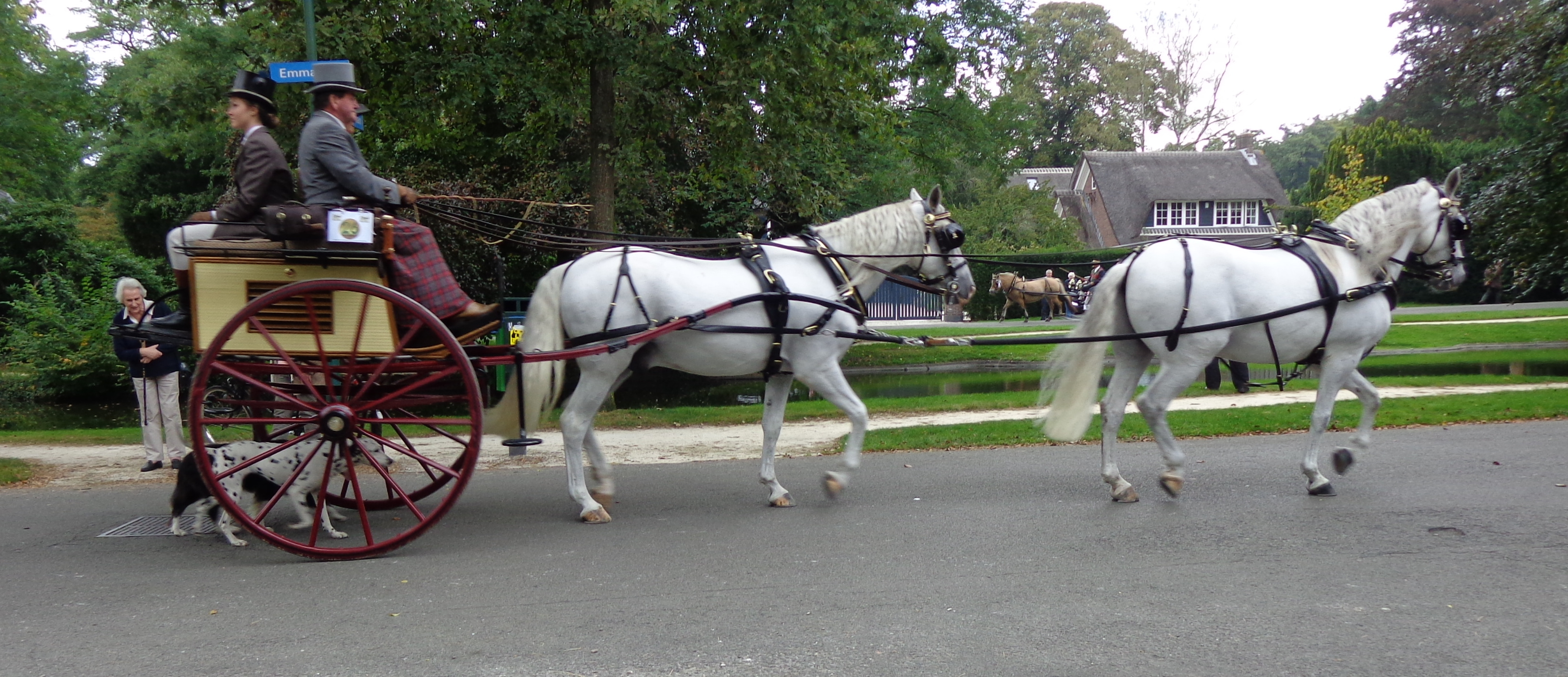
Dogcart with horses in tandem

A dogcart (also dog-cart or dog cart) is a two-wheeled horse-drawn vehicle pulled by a single horse in shafts, or driven tandem. With seating for four, it was designed for sporting shooters and their gun dogs, with a louvred box under the driver's seat to contain dogs. It was developed in the early 1800s to afford more seating than the gig, which seats only two. Seating is two back-to-back crosswise seats, an arrangement called dos-à-dos from French. There is a hinged tailboard which lowers slightly and, supported by chains, acts as a footrest for the rear-facing passengers. Some dogcarts had a mechanism to slide the entire body forward or rearward along the shafts to help balance the weight for the horse.

Other names for specific or regional designs of dogcarts include Battlesden cart, Bent panel cart, Bounder, Country cart, Essex trap, Farmer's dogcart, Going-to-cover cart, High dogcart, Hurdle cart, Leamington cart, Malvern cart, Moray car, Newport Pagnell cart, Norfolk cart, Norfolk shooting cart, Nottingham cart, Oxford bounder, Oxford dogcart, Pony dogcart, Ralli dogcart, Sliding bodied dogcart, Surrey cart, Tandem cart, To-cart, Whitechapel cart, Worcester cart, and Worthing cart.

== Dogcart phaeton ==
A dogcart phaeton is a four-wheeled vehicle pulled by a single horse in shafts, or a pair of horses with a carriage pole. The dogcart phaeton seats four people and is arranged as two back-to-back crosswise seats, called dos-à-dos, with two people facing forward and two others facing the rear. Though the word cart generally means a two-wheeled vehicle, the name dogcart stuck when the body style was mounted on four-wheeled phaeton undercarriages.

Other names for specific or regional designs of four-wheel dogcarts include Alexandra dogcart, Continental dogcart, Eridge car, Four-wheeled Ralli car, French Derby cart, Malvern dogcart, Martin's dogcart, and Village phaeton.

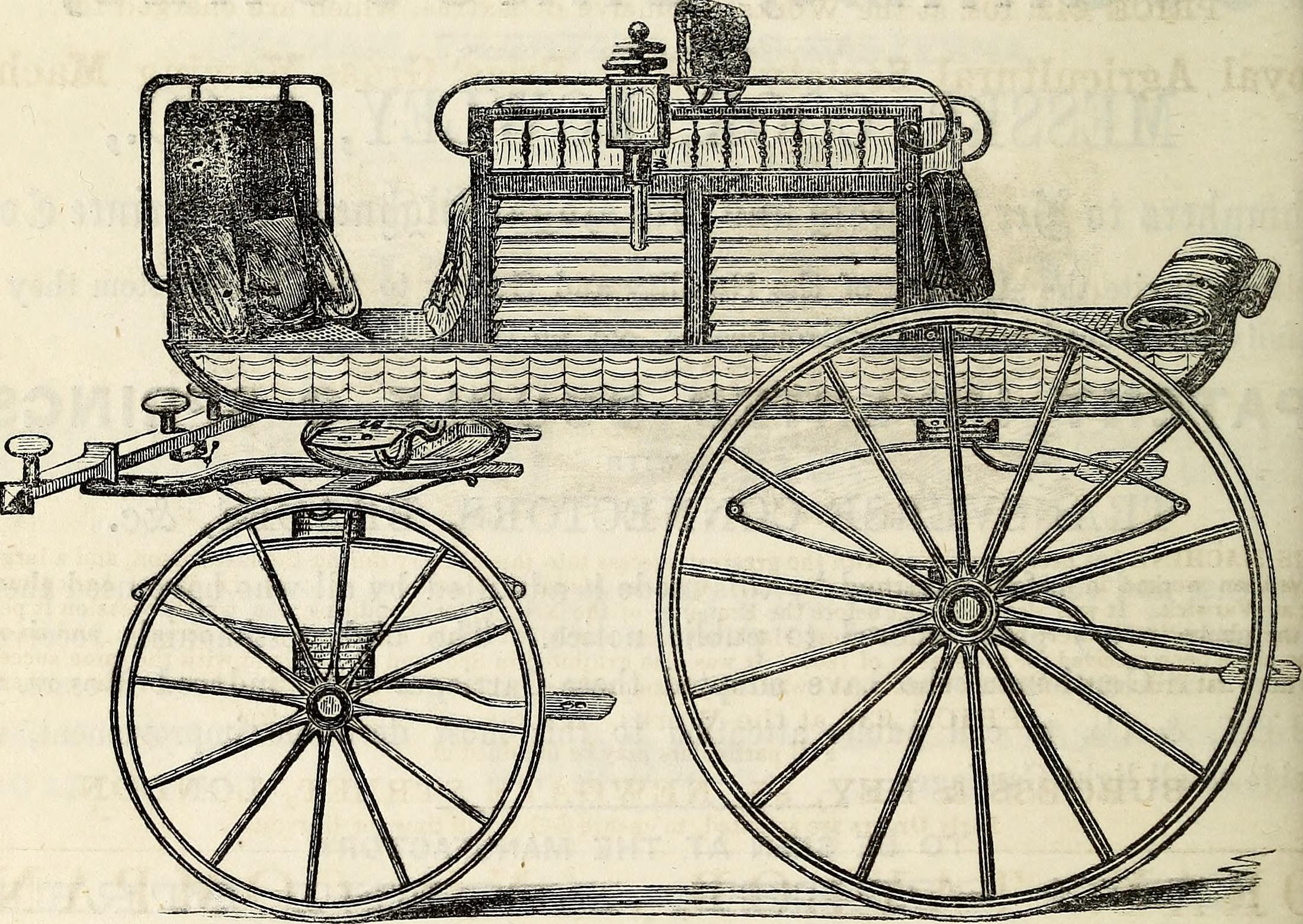
Four-wheel dog cart

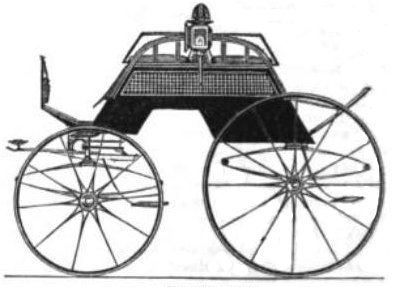
Alexandra car, an American version of dogcart phaeton with dos-à-dos seating and a cut under for the forewheels

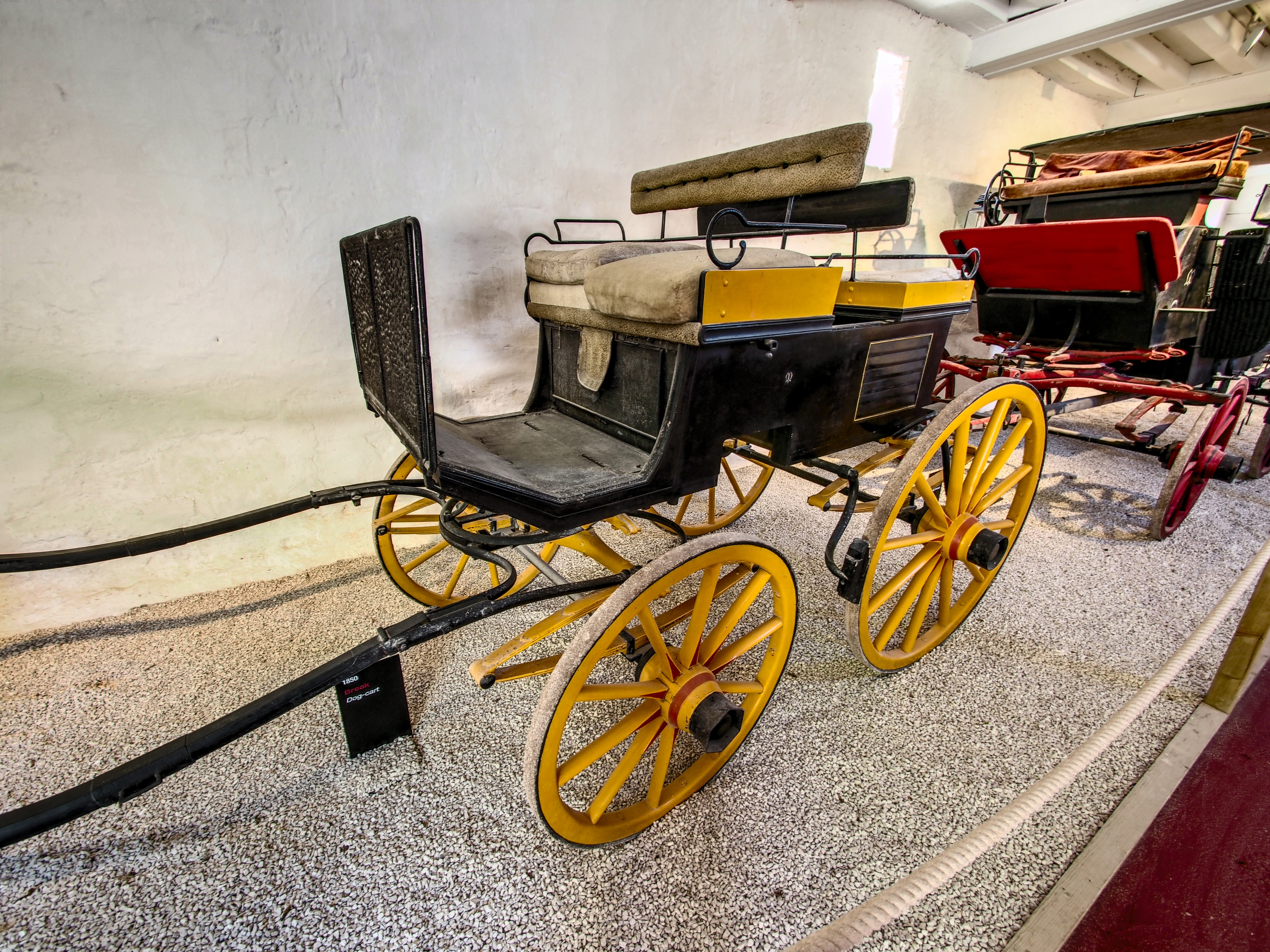
Dogcart phaeton

== In literature ==
Frequent references to dog-carts are made by Sir Arthur Conan Doyle in his writings about fictional detective Sherlock Holmes, and by many other Victorian writers, as they were a common sight in that era.

In Os Maias, the protagonist, Carlos, makes use of a dogcart "in great style" to move around Lisbon.

== See also ==
- Carriage
- American Electric (1899 automobile), early electric vehicle based on dogcart phaeton structure
- Arrol-Johnston, maker of early automobiles based on the dogcart phaeton structure
