= Cape cart =

Two-wheeled four-seater carriage

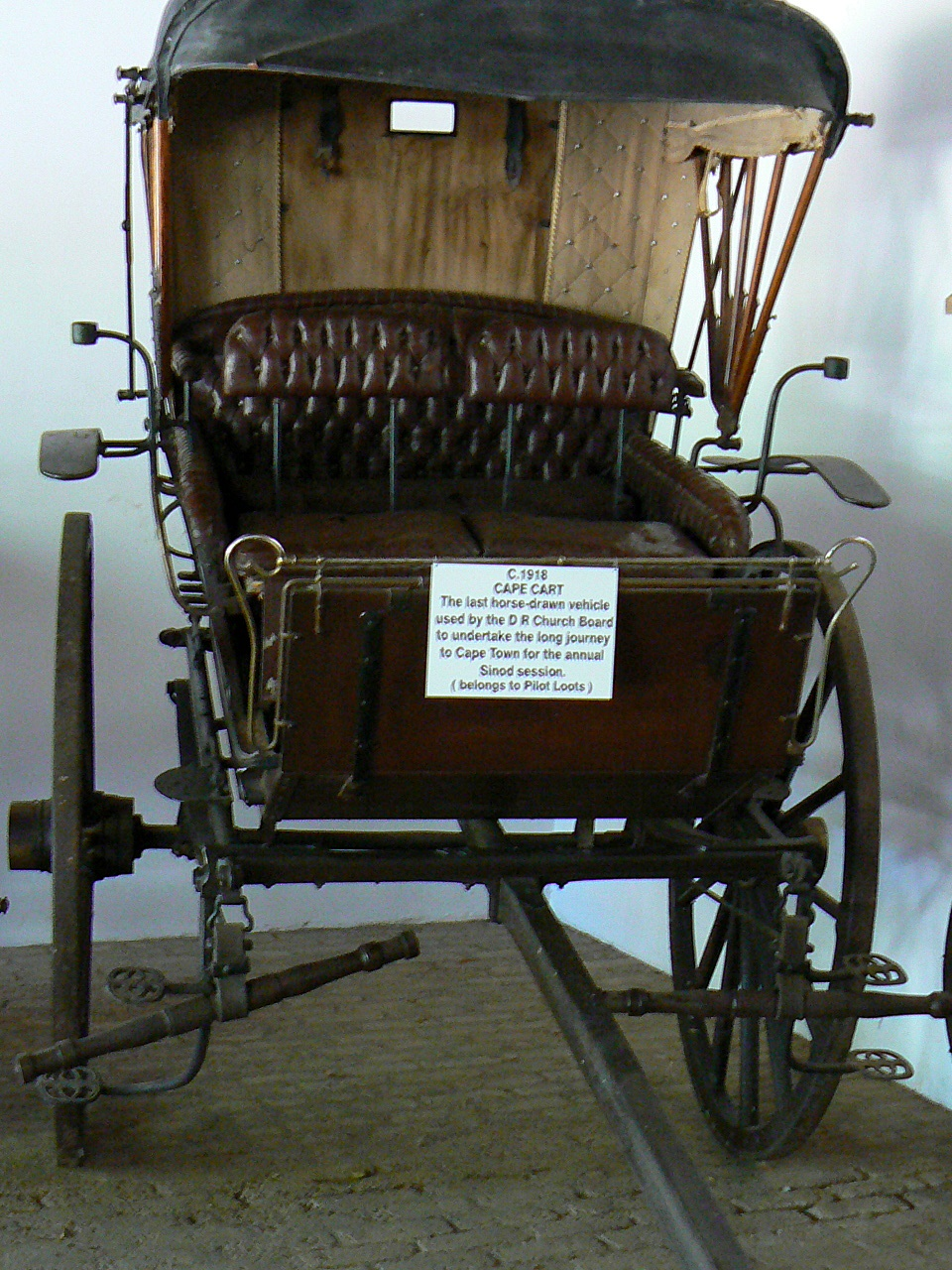

A cape cart is a two-wheeled four-seater carriage drawn by two horses and formerly used in South Africa. Equipped with a bowed canvas or leather hood, it was used to carry passengers and mail in the days before railways and was one of the fastest means of transport available in the region. Cape carts were developed by the Boers as a safe way to travel across even rough terrain. The name comes from the Cape of Good Hope. Unlike most two-wheeled carriages, the Cape cart was designed to be drawn by a pair of horses using a pole and a wooden yoke.

Known in Afrikaans from before the 1820s as a kapkar (a cart with a hood), its name was mistakenly rendered by English-speaking people as "Cape cart".

== See also ==
- Curricle — British two-wheeled carriage drawn by a pair of horses
- Sjees — Dutch two-wheeled carriage drawn by a single or pair of horses
