= Gallop & Ride =

2008 video game

- Developer(s): Sproing Interactive
- Publisher(s): THQ
- Platform(s): Wii
- Release: NA: November 17, 2008
- Genre(s): Simulation
- Mode(s): Single-player

Gallop and Ride (German: Mein Gestüt: Ein Leben für die Pferde) is a horse-themed video game for the Nintendo Wii, developed by Austrian studio Sproing Interactive Media GmbH, and published by THQ in 2008.

== Overview ==
The main objective of the game is to renovate the ranch for visiting guests and clients. The player is given the ranch, and is tasked with restoring it to its former glory.

=== Gameplay ===
Gameplay is centered around training and caring for your horse, and upgrading ranch facilities. You can feed, groom, breed, and train your horse. Once horses are sufficiently trained and groomed, they can be entered into competitions.

==== You and Your Horse ====
There are three horse breeds available in game: Friesian, Hanoverian, and Andalusian, and seven colors: black, white, gray, bay, red, cream, and palomino. Colors can be arranged in six different patterns: black hair (mane and tail), solid, pinto, dapple, socks, and stripes. The gender of horses is not selectable, as all of the player's horses are female and can be mated with rented studs through the breeding center. The player is customizable as well, with several different outfits available, some of which are unlocked as the game progresses.

== See also ==
- Paws and Claws: Pet Vet
- Horsez
- Barbie Horse Adventures
- My Horse & Me
- My Horse & Me 2
