= Panzer Tactics HD =

2014 video game

- Steam digital banner art
- Developer: Sproing Interactive Media
- Publisher: bitComposer Games
- Platforms: Microsoft Windows, iOS
- Release: May 22, 2014
- Genre: Turn-based tactics
- Mode: Single player

Panzer Tactics HD is a turn-based tactical video game for PC and iPad developed by Sproing Interactive Media and published by bitComposer Games. The game was released on May 22, 2014 on Steam and on iOS for the iPad. It was released worldwide in English, French, Italian, German, Spanish and Russian.

== Gameplay ==
In 1939, German and Russian troops attack Poland and plunge Europe into the World War II. Panzer Tactics HD picks up the story here, giving the player the chance to experience intense battles in three extensive campaigns with more than 150 units and countless tactical options. The players participate in the offensive of the German troops, the Soviet counter-attack and the liberation of Europe by the Allied Forces across three campaigns. The game contains more than 30 missions with additional scenarios. Varying terrain, weather and the morale of player's troops turn each battle into a challenge. The enemy will exploit any tactical misstep in order to defeat the player.

== Reception ==
Panzer Tactics HD received average review from professional critics upon release. Aggregate review website Metacritic assigned a score of 69/100 based on 11 reviews. Softpedia rated the game 6.5 out of 10 praising its solid turn-based system and the classic battle choices it offers, while at the same time criticizing the limited context and some UI issues. The German gaming magazine GameStar praised the well programmed interaction between artillery, airplanes and infantry and rated Panzer Tactics HD 80 out of 100. The game is recurringly criticized for not offering enough guidance to ease players into the complexity of the game. Publisher bitComposer Games reacted to the feedback by releasing so called "Intelligence Reports" that are supposed to gradually explain specific aspects of the game.

== See also ==
- Panzer Tactics DS
