= Arabo-Friesian =

Recent breed of horse, selected since the 1960s

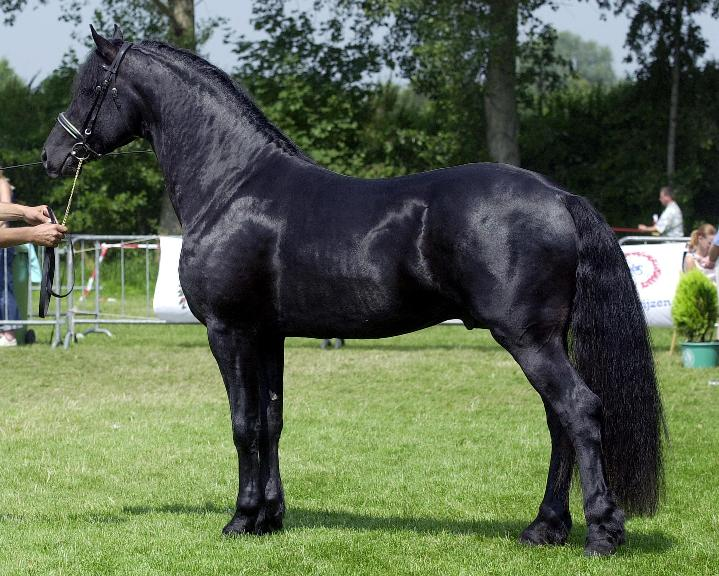
- Stallion Dark Ynte, 37.5% Arabian, born 2001, 1.67 m.
- Country of origin: Netherlands
- Use: Dressage, show jumping, pleasure

Traits
- Color: Black, gray

Breed standards
- European Arabo-Friesian studbook; Association Française du Cheval Arabo-Frison

The Arabo-Friesian (Dutch: Arabo Friese Paard) is a recent breed of horse, selected over several generations since the 1960s to obtain the morphology of the modern Friesian combined with the endurance qualities of the Arabian. The creation of this breed was strongly contested by some Dutch Friesian breeders, who went so far as to set fire to the stables where the first crosses were made.

The Arabo-Frisian is not the result of a direct cross between a Friesian and an Arab, but has an average of 10–20% Arabian origins, making it very close to the Friesian. Its European studbook has been open since 2000. In 2013, the breed had around 850 members worldwide.

== History ==
The Arabo-Friesian is one of many crossbreeds that include the Arabian, though its primary foundation stock is Friesian.

Its very recent creation is the result of several European initiatives. In the 1960s, the lack of stamina and breath in Friesian horses in combined driving competitions prompted the Hillner family to crossbreed with Arabian horses, known for their endurance, after receiving permission from Juliana, Queen of the Netherlands.

The Hillners bred several Friesian mares to Jalisco, a gray Arabian stallion standing at stud at Gestuet Marbach. Some Friesian breeders objected, and the Hillners' stables were burned down. Two foals were rescued, sired by the Egyptian Arabian stallion Gharib, Ras and Rachel, as well as another sired by Jalisco, a gray colt named Negus, who later sired the gray Arabo-Friesian stallion Nero. Professor Hillner, the head of the Hillner family and the head of the operation, took refuge in Germany, before Cor and Jan Driessen resumed the experiment in the Netherlands. They chose new breeding stock, and sought the sporting aptitudes associated with the original qualities of the Friesian, while taking part in international combined driving competitions.

In 2000, the European Arabo-Friesian Studbook was created. In 2002, the first stallion, YK Dark Danilo, was licensed for breeding. 2005 saw the creation of the Association française du cheval Arabo-frison (AFCAF), and 2006 saw recognition of the studbook in Belgium. Since 1 October 2010, the Arabo-Friesian breed has been registered in France, enabling foals born in France to be entered in the European studbook. It is now recognized as a breed in its own right throughout Europe.

== Description ==
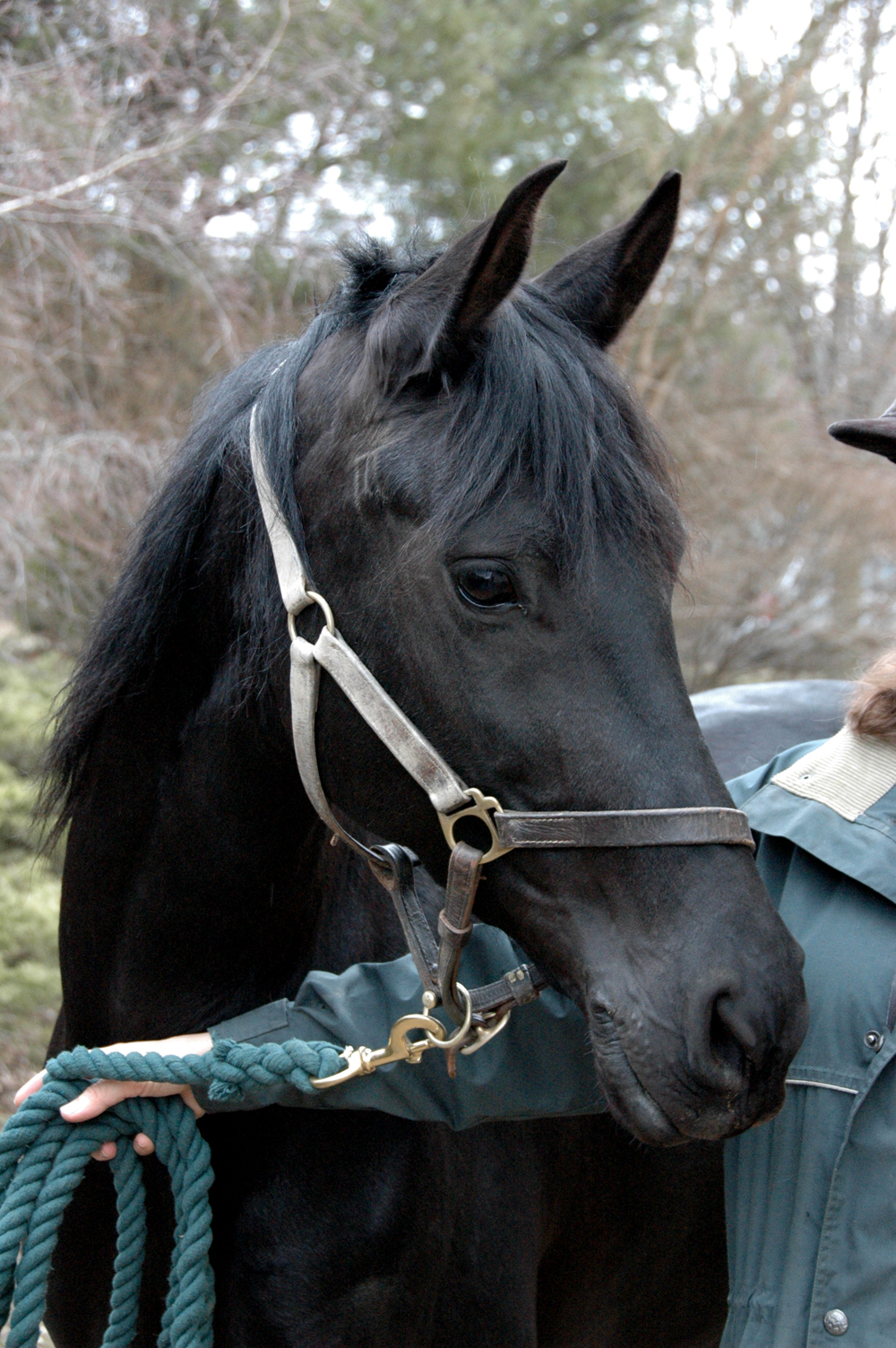
Head of a black Arabo-frisian mare.

The average Arab-Frisian is 10–20% Arab. The only notable differences are a finer, more refined head, finer limbs and smaller hooves. It has a long neck, combined with the upright, curved head of the Friesian.

Selection of the breed is very rigorous, and tends towards uniformity of type. The studbook has strict requirements in terms of morphology, aptitudes, size and coat. At the age of three, the Friesian Arabian must measure over 1.52 m, with a minimum height of 1.58 m required for stallions. As an adult, the minimum height required is 1.55 m, and 1.60 m for stallions. As with the Friesian, black is the only coat permitted, though unlicensed gray Arabo-Friesians also exist. International stallions are not required to wear any white markings, although these are tolerated on all other horses. They are also subject to sporting performance tests.

The aim is to obtain a sport horse with less elevated gaits than the Friesian, more economical movements in all three gaits, and plenty of suppleness. The Friesian Arabian must also retain the Friesian's character, friendliness and ease of handling. Like the Arab and Friesian, this breed is genetically predisposed to recurrent seasonal dermatitis (SSRD).

== Uses ==
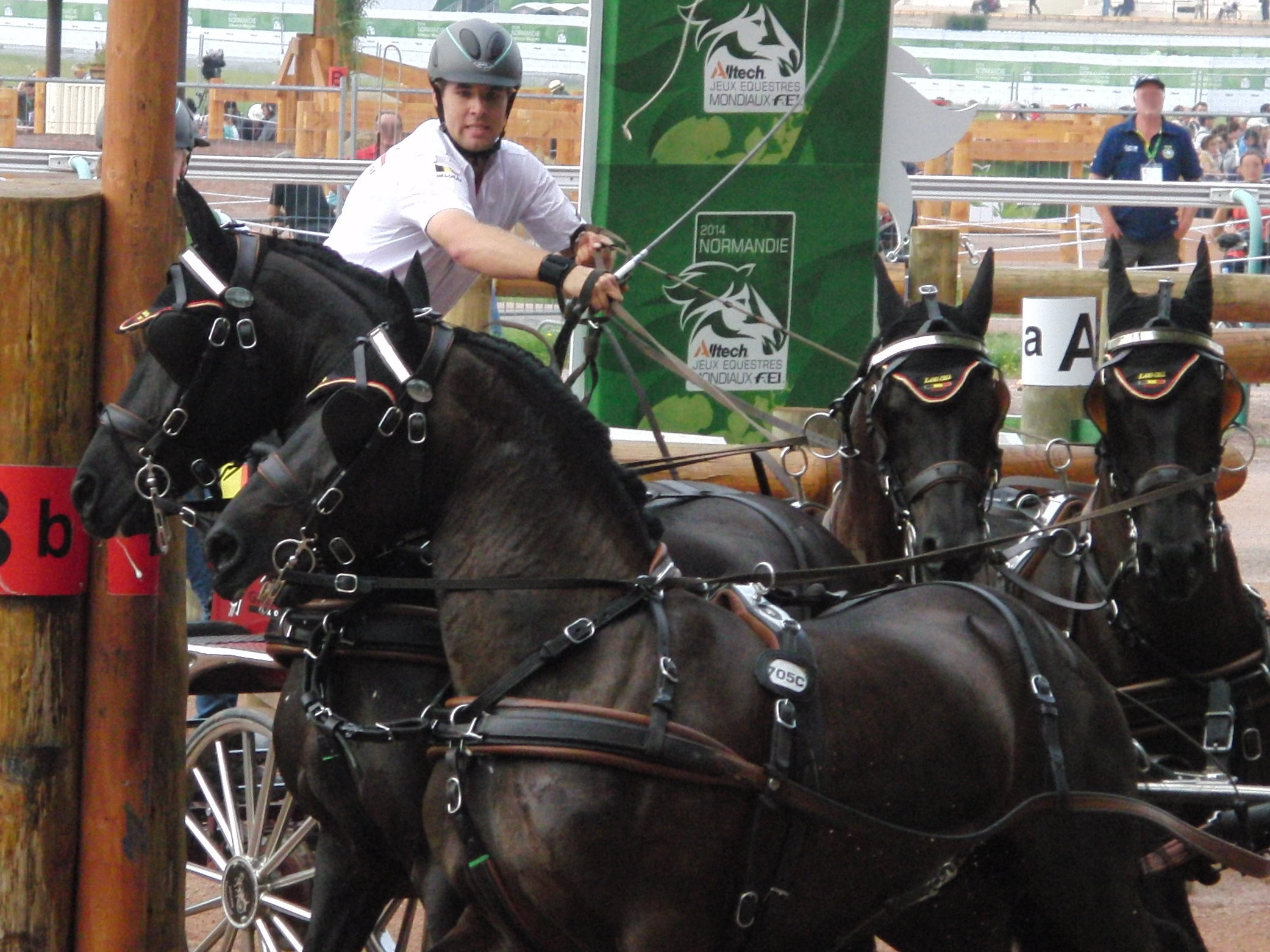
Belgian driver Edouard Simonet and his arabo-friesians at the 2014 World Equestrian Games.

The Arabo-Friesian is bred to be a sport horse, with more breath and endurance than the Friesian. The first approved stallion, Yk Dark Danilo, was for many years part of Belgium's national champion four-horse team. In 2009, the Belgian one-horse driving champion was the Friesian Arab Maestro. Belgian driver Edouard Simonet led a team of four Arabo-Friesians at the 2014 World Equestrian Games. In addition to driving, these horses are shown in dressage competitions.

== Distribution ==
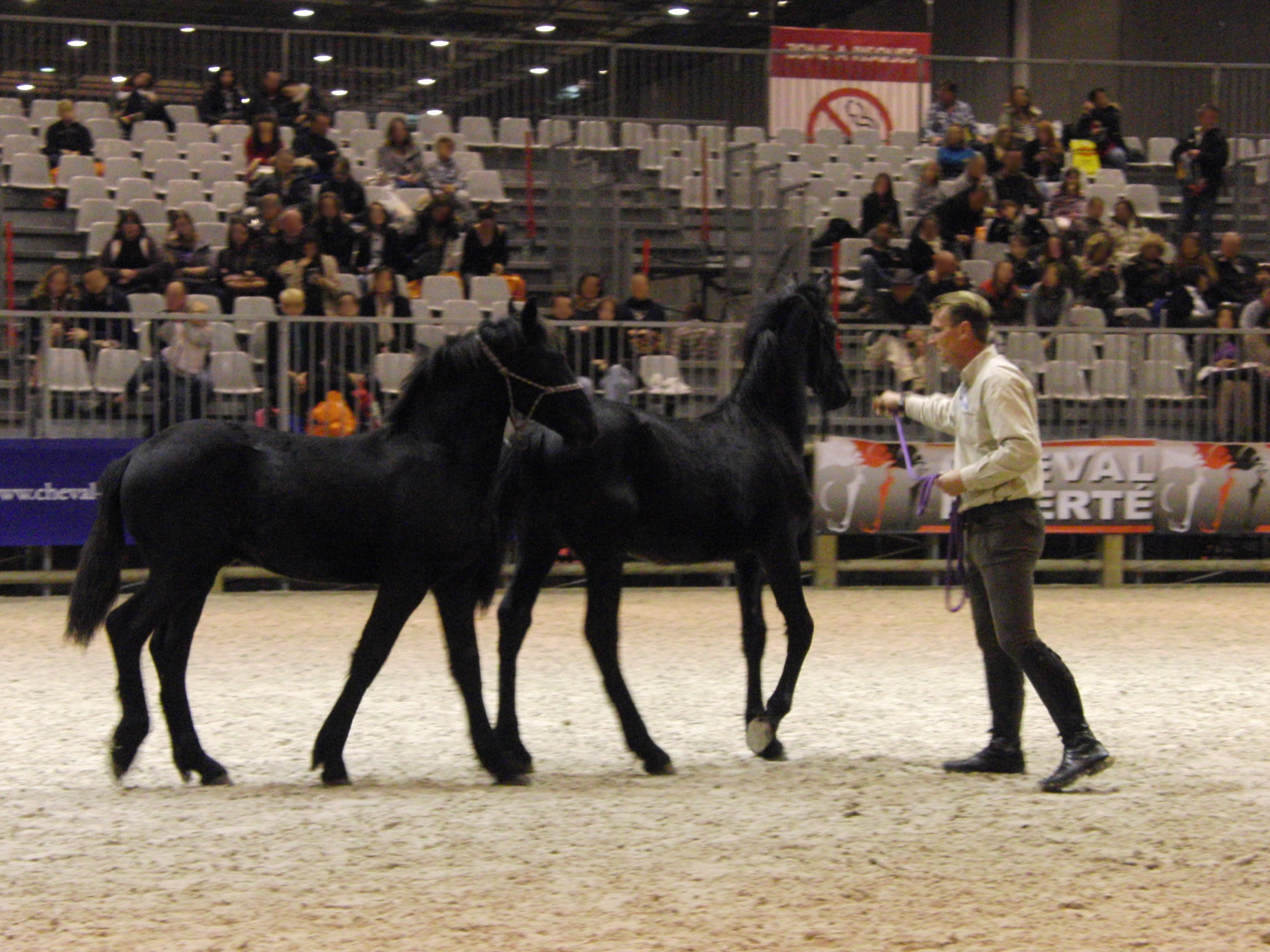
Foal presentation at the 2014 Salon du cheval de Paris, or Paris Horse Show – Damien Chaulet.

Arabo-Friesians have spread throughout Europe thanks to their sporting abilities, and are also being exported to the United States and Canada.

In 2013, between 800 and 900 were registered worldwide, including 120 in France. In the same year, this young breed registered around 200 new births every year, including around 20 in France. There are twelve international breeding stallions authorized to cover without restriction. In 2013, the Belgian herd stood at between 146 and 219 individuals, placing the Arabo-Friesian among the breeds with low numbers.

== See also ==
- Friesian horse
- Friesian Sporthorse
- Arabian horse
- List of horse breeds

== Bibliography ==
- Boitin, C. (2011). "L'Arabo-Frison : une race à part entière". Attelages Magazines (in French) (72): 34–37.
- Brengard, Emmanuelle (October 2013). "Arabo-frison". 60 races de chevaux de selle (in French). Glénat. pp. 36–37. ISBN 978-2-7234-9212-6.
- "Arabo Friese Paard / Belgium (Horse)". fao.org. Domestic Animal Diversity Information System of the Food and Agriculture Organization of the United Nations (DAD-IS). FAO database, Belgium, Horse
