= Panzer Tactics DS =

2007 video game

- Developer: Sproing Interactive Media
- Publishers: DS: NA: Conspiracy Entertainment; EU: 10tacle Studios; Windows, iOS: WW: bitComposer Games
- Platforms: Nintendo DS, Windows
- Release: DS: NA: November 7, 2007; PAL: February 15, 2008; Windows, iOS: WW: May 22, 2014
- Genre: Turn-based tactics
- Modes: Single player, 1-4 Multiplayer

Panzer Tactics DS is a turn-based tactical video game for the Nintendo DS developed by Sproing Interactive Media. It was released in North America on November 7, 2007. An HD remake by bitComposer Games, named Panzer Tactics HD, was released for PC and iPad on May 22, 2014.

== Gameplay ==
Panzer Tactics DS is set in World War II. The game includes three campaigns: German, Russian, and Allied, with 10 missions plus one bonus mission each. In addition to single player, the DS version also has Nintendo Wi-fi Connection, wireless, and hotseat multiplayer.

The in game play itself is very close to 1995's critically acclaimed Panzer General from Strategic Simulations, Inc (SSI). Various actual units of WW2 battle by attacking opposing units until their strength of 10 reaches 0. These units are placed in broad categories that have advantages over other categories, i.e. artillery is strong against infantry but weak against vehicles. Various objective cities must be captured using these units in a specified amount of days to complete a scenario.

Completing optional mission objectives unlocks bonus missions and other tactical enhancements. The game includes over 20 special attacks and 150 land, sea, and air units. There are 10 multiplayer maps of various sizes played over 14 different types of terrain. Different battle animations for all units and a wide range of special effects, explosions, and weather effects are displayed.

The Nintendo Wi-fi Connection and wireless multiplayer allow for up to four players per game, while hotseat mode allows two players on the same Nintendo DS. An online ladder system tracks high scores.

== Reception ==
Reception

Review scores
Publication	Score
GameRevolution	B-
IGN	6.0/10

Panzer Tactics DS received mixed reviews overall. IGN praised the single player campaigns, but criticized the multiplayer modes. GameRevolution also praised the single player mode, but criticised the multiplayer for its technical issues. Review aggregator sites Metacritic and GameRankings rate Panzer Tactics DS at 67/100 and 70% respectively.

== See also ==
- Panzer General
- Panzer Tactics HD
