= Ultimate Winter Games =

2003 video game

- Developer: Sproing Interactive
- Publisher: Telegames
- Platform: Game Boy Advance
- Release: 5 December 2003
- Genre: Sports
- Modes: Single-player, multiplayer

Ultimate Winter Games is a 2003 video game for the Game Boy Advance developed by Sproing Interactive and published by Telegames. The game features a set of four winter sports, including downhill skiing, curling, snowboarding and bobsledding. Upon release, the game received a mixed reception, with critics praising the game's visual presentation and critiquing its limited and simplistic series of events.

== Gameplay ==
Gameplay screenshot

Ultimate Winter Games is a collection of four arcade-style winter sports games, including downhill skiing, curling, snowboarding and bobsledding. In several events, including downhill skiing and bobsledding, the player is required to reach the end of a downhill course in the fastest time, using the control pad to maintain the highest speed and keep the player upright without crashing. The game features several modes. In 'Championship' mode, the player is able to play and unlock tracks that can then be played individually in 'Practice' mode. The game also features a 'Tournament' mode in which the player can design a series of events to complete. The game supports multiplayer play using the Game Link Cable for face-to-face play in the curling event.

== Reception ==
Reception

Review scores
Publication	Score
AllGame	2/5
GameZone	7.0/10
IGN	6/10
Nintendo Power	2.9/5

Ultimate Winter Games received mixed reviews upon release. Anise Hollingshead of GameZone praised the courses as "attractive" and "visually appealing", but observed they were basic in design, of a short duration, and lacked variety in game modes. Nintendo Power found the game to offer a "fair amount" of gameplay variety across modes and praised the controls as "very good". Craig Harris of IGN found the graphics and gameplay to be "capable" and the challenges "fun in their own way", a decent framerate and good sense of speed. He also found the game controls and collisions to be positive aspects. He critiqued the game's challenges to be "a little on the basic side" and lacking defining features in their design, also describing the progression of identical events at increasing difficulty as poorly-designed.
