= Vlaamperd =

South African breed of horse

- Conservation status: FAO (2007): not listed; DAD-IS (2021): unknown
- Other names: SA Vlaamperd; Vlaamse perd
- Country of origin: South Africa

Traits
- Height: 147–157 cm; average: 154 cm
- Colour: black; dark seal brown (mares only)

The Vlaamperd is a South African breed of light draught or harness horse; it is also suitable for riding and is used in dressage. It was bred in the Western Cape region of South Africa in the early twentieth century, and resulted from cross-breeding of local mares with imported European stallions, particularly Friesians. The horses are usually black, though mares may be dark seal brown. A stud-book was started in 1983.

== History ==
The Vlaamperd derives from the now-extinct Hantam Horse or Cape Horse, a riding horse bred in the former Cape Province, particularly after 1814 when Lord Charles Somerset imported Thoroughbred stallions from Britain. Shortly after the end of the Second Boer War in 1902, a funeral director in Cape Town imported a few Friesian stallions. Because exports of Friesians from the Netherlands were not permitted at the time, they were shipped from Antwerp in Belgium; for this reason Friesians came to be known in South Africa as Vlaams Perde, meaning 'Flemish Horses'. (Note: Despite the similarity of the name there is no connection to the Belgian Flemish Horse or Vlaams Paard.) The Vlaamperd descends from the offspring of Hantam and other mares put to these stallions. There was some later influence from other foreign breeds: an Ostfriesen and Alt-Oldenburger stallion named Kemp made a significant contribution to the early development of the Vlaamperd, as did a Cleveland Bay stallion named Scheepers in the 1940s.

In 1983 a breed society, the Suid Afrikaanse Vlaamperdtelersgenootskap or South African Vlaamperd Breeders Society, was started in Bloemfontein; a stud-book was begun in the same year.

The conservation status of the breed is not clear – population data has not been reported to DAD-IS since 1999. In 2013 there were about 200 horses.

== Characteristics ==
The Vlaamperd stands on average 154 cm (15.1 h) at the withers. Its appearance is similar to that of the Friesian, but less heavy, with finer bone. It has a thick mane and tail, a well-rounded croup, long legs and a high-arched neck, and steps high when in motion.

Stallions are black, while mares may also be dark seal brown.

== Use ==
The Vlaamperd may be used as a riding horse, a carriage horse or for classical dressage.
