= Curricle =

Two-wheeled carriage drawn by two horses

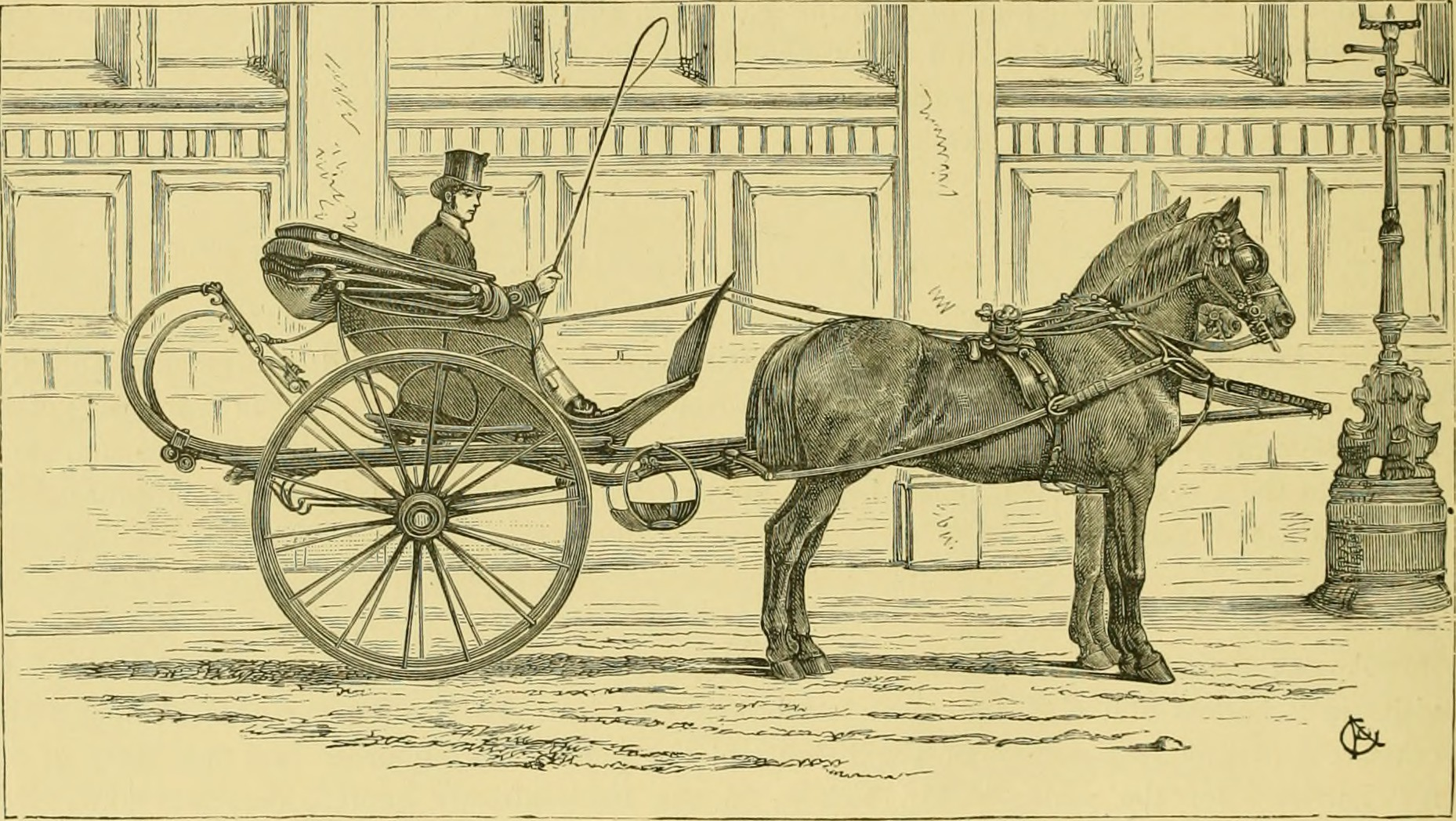
Curricle

A curricle is a two-wheeled carriage drawn by two horses abreast.

== Design ==
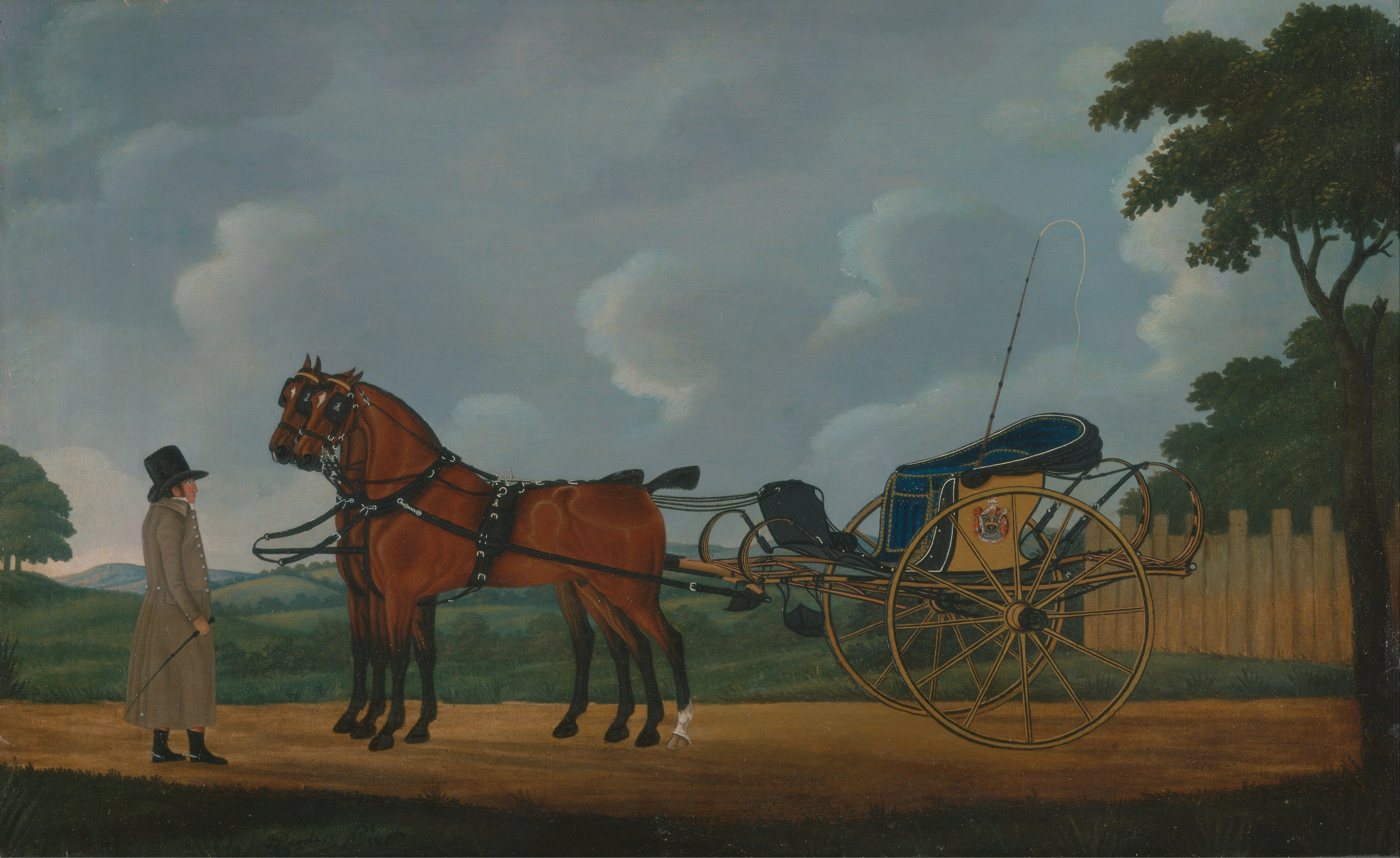
Curricle, oil by John Cordrey (1806)

Curricles are harnessed with a pole between the horses, and have an iron crossbar (the curricle-bar) which rests over the harness saddle and supports the weight of the pole by way of a heavy strap.

Jean‑Louis Libourel, a French historian of carriages and former Chief Curator of Heritage in the French Ministry of Culture, has written that the curricle (called carrick à pompe in French) had a body similar to a cabriolet, an 'S' curved back, and was mounted on a six-spring chassis. The carriage was owner-driven rather than using a hired coachman. Behind the seat which held two people, there was either a footboard or rumble seat for a liveried groom. The groom's weight would help to balance the carriage.

The harness arrangement is complicated and difficult to fit correctly to the horses. Straps are used both to help support the heavy pole and to allow the horses to move without transmitting every motion directly to the pole, and thus to the vehicle and its passengers.

=== Variations ===
A curricle is essentially a chaise or chair built to be pulled by two horses instead of one, thus having a pole instead of two shafts. In America, the carriage was sometimes called a pole-chair or a double-chair. Some later designs of curricles were built to be convertible and could be used with a single pole (two horses) or two shafts (single horse). This same convertible arrangement also became available for gigs and whiskeys, which were then called gig-curricles and whiskey-curricles.

It was once fashionable for a curricle to be accompanied by two liveried grooms on horseback, riding ahead or behind the carriage, though the practice was later discontinued.

== Historical context ==
The curricle was invented in the last quarter of the 18th century in Italy and came to England in the early 1800s by way of France. The word curricle comes from curriculum, the name of the Roman racing chariot. In Latin, the word curriculum means "running", "racecourse" or "chariot".

According to Walrond, there were many accidents with curricles because if one of a pair of horses slipped and fell, it brought down the second horse, tipping the carriage and pitching the driver out of the carriage. The ratio of draft—one lightweight carriage compared to two horses pulling—was so low that curricles were often driven faster than they should, leading to collisions or accidents when a horse slipped. The danger, plus the development of the safer mail phaeton and cabriolet, replaced curricles as the fashionable carriage of the time.

It was a vehicle of easy draught, and could be driven at great speed. Unfortunately it was rather dangerous if the horses shied or stumbled, and this tended to reduce the demand for it.

— Lilian Baker Carlisle

The curricle-harness has serious flaws: if one horse slips and falls, the curricle-bar drags down its teammate, ejecting the driver as the carriage nosedives.

== Modern usage ==
In his 2005 book, Libourel mentions that the National stud of Saint-Lô in France was still regularly using their curricle and curricle harnesses.

== See also ==
- Carriage
- Horse-drawn vehicle
- Sjees
