= Chaise =

Two-wheeled horse-drawn carriage

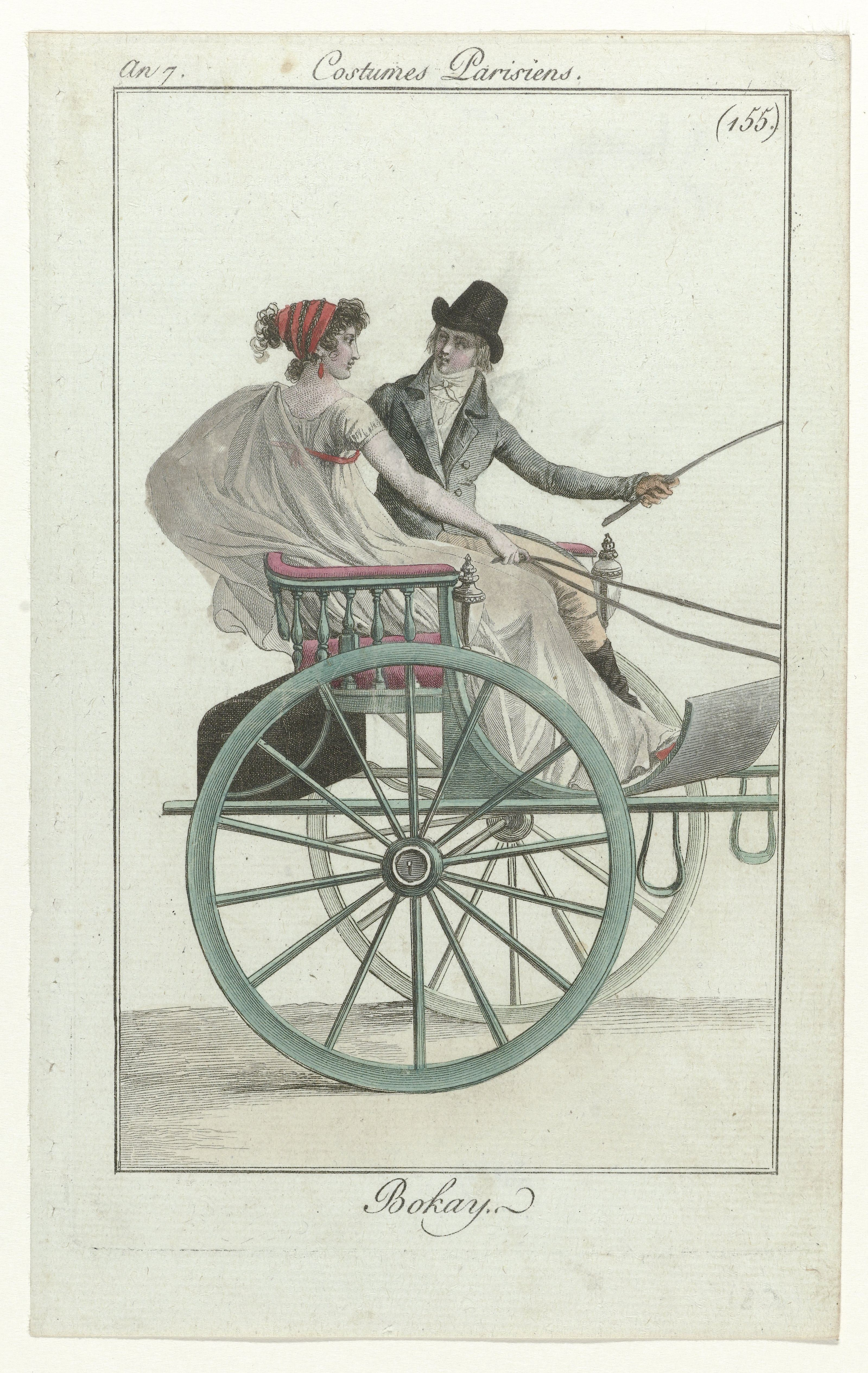
Drawing of a chaise in Paris, 1799

A chaise (/ʃeɪz/ shayz), sometimes called shay, is a light two-wheeled carriage for one or two people. It may also have a folding hood. The coachmaker William Felton (1796) considered chaises to be a family of vehicles which included all two-wheel one-horse vehicles such as gigs and whiskies. A similar carriage pulled by two-horses is identified as a curricle.

== Etymology ==
The name, in use in England before 1700, came from the French word chaise, meaning chair. (Note: Chaise: Taken from the French word 'chair' and used generally in the naming of various vehicles such as the Post Chaise. In the 1800s numerous French designs and ideas were copied in England which inevitably led to the common use of French words in describing that which became generally accepted as an English vehicle. The Char-a-Banc is a classic example of using a French word for an English vehicle.) The spelling shay is a colloquial variant of chaise, particularly in North America. A variant chay is slang and sometimes refers to other types of vehicle.

== Design ==
The chaise is a two-wheeled carriage pulled by a single horse, usually with a chair-backed seat suitable for one or two persons. Felton writes that it is the finished look which dictates which type of chaise they are, but their construction is one of only two types: "the one, a chair-back body for gig or curricle, which hangs by braces—the other, a simple half-pannel whiskey, which fixes on the shafts".

A light chaise having two seats is a double chair. A chaise-cart is a light carriage used for transporting lightweight goods instead of people. A sjees is often referred to as a Friesian chaise. A post chaise is a vehicle designed for private long-distance travel via posting stations, originally with two-wheels (known as chaise-a-porteurs or posting chariot) but later becoming a four-wheeled vehicle while retaining the word "chaise" in the name.

A riding chair was a chaise body with no top. This type of a chaise was also known under multiple other names: Windsor riding chair, solo chair, gig. The riding chair originated in England, but using the Windsor chair was an American contribution, with the earliest known mention from Charleston, North Carolina in 1757.

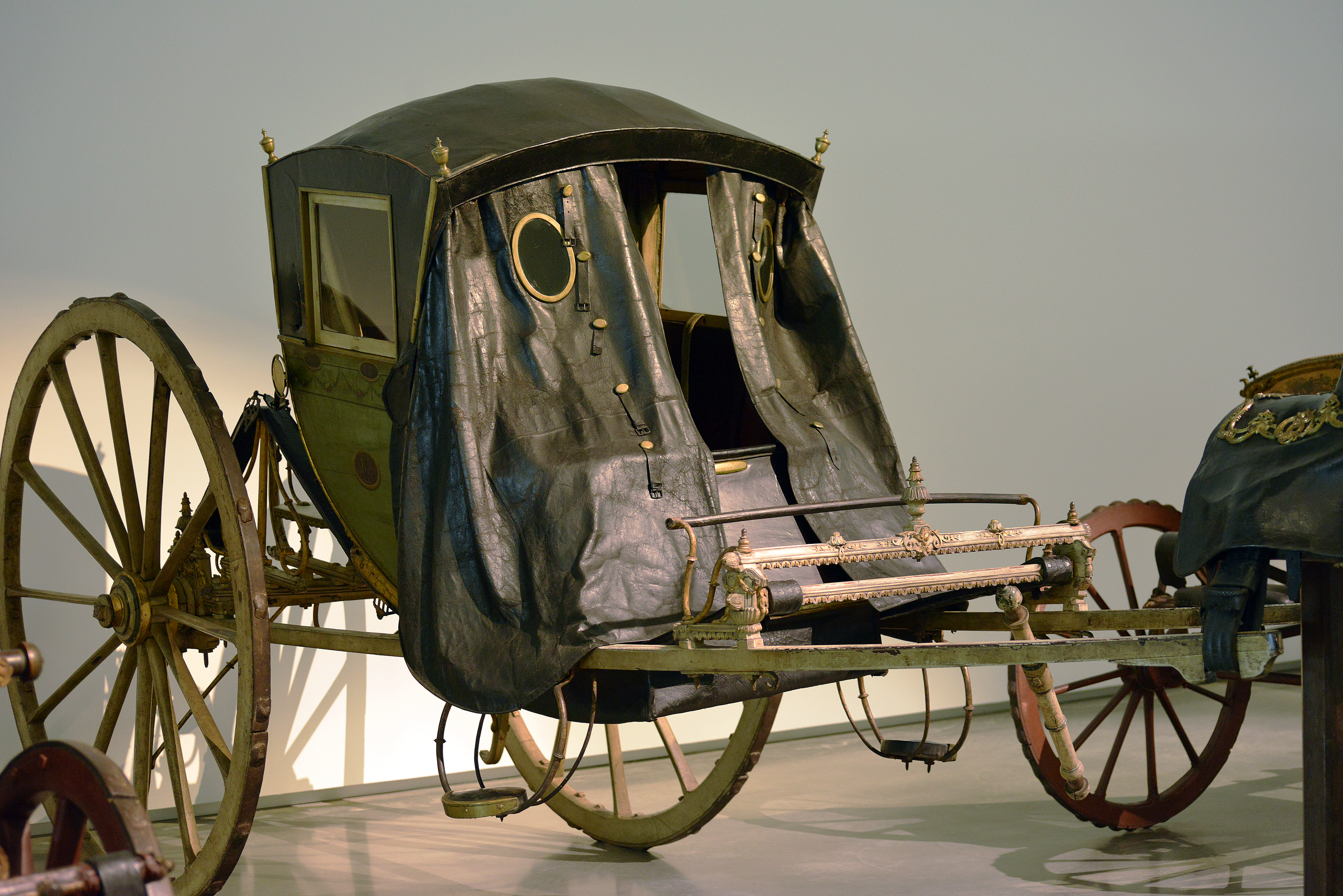
Portugal

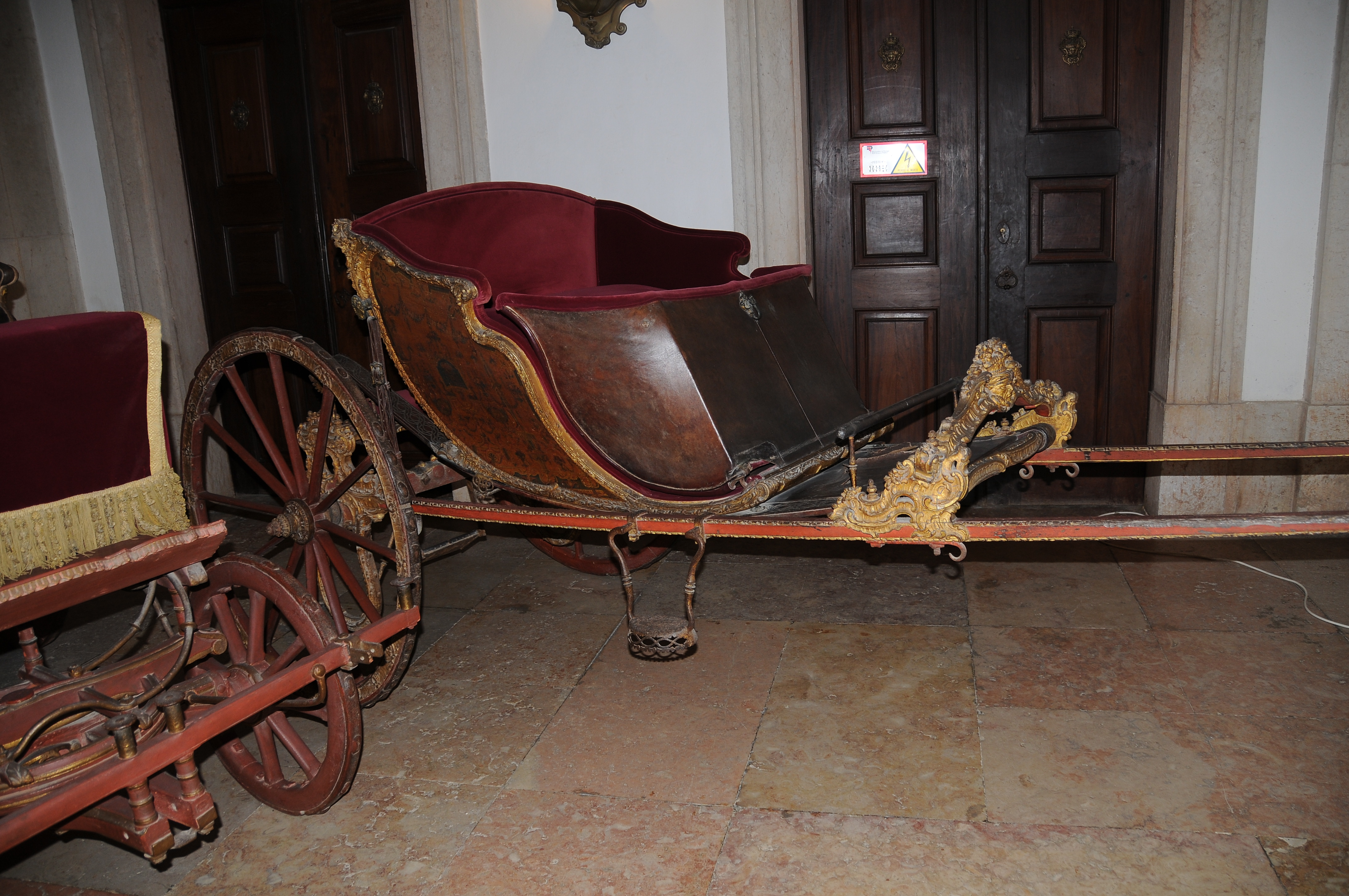
Portugal

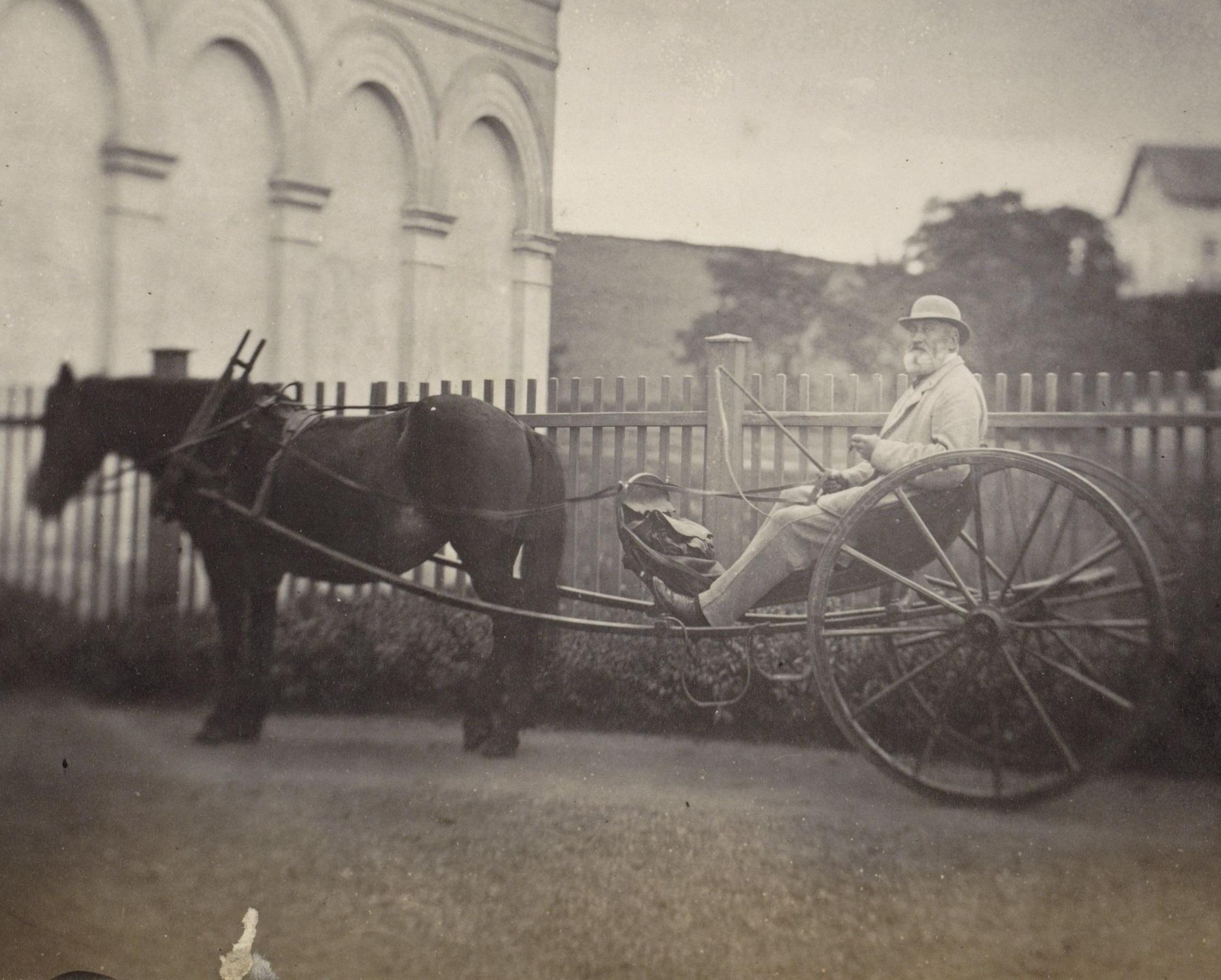
Netherlands

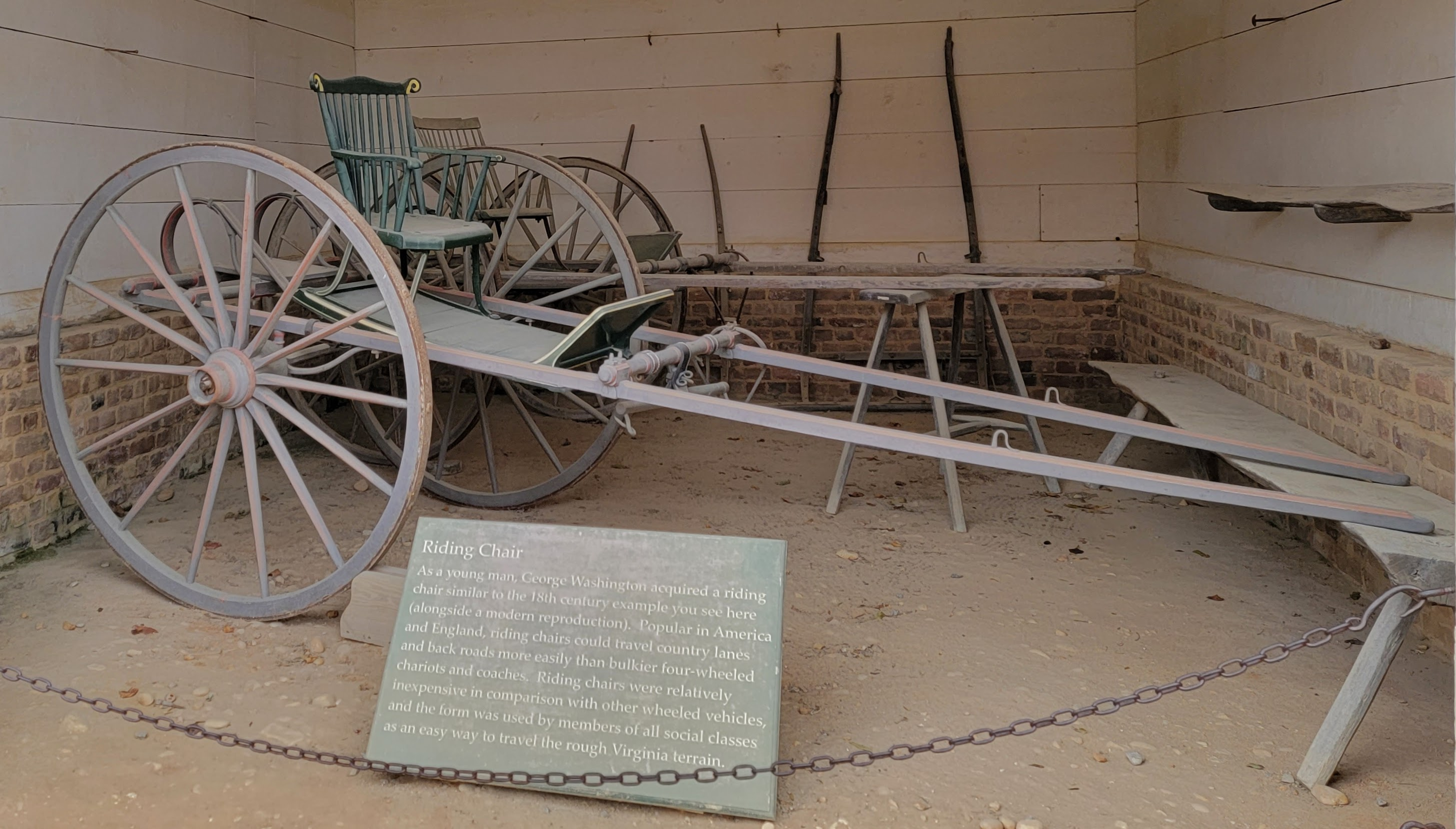
Riding chair

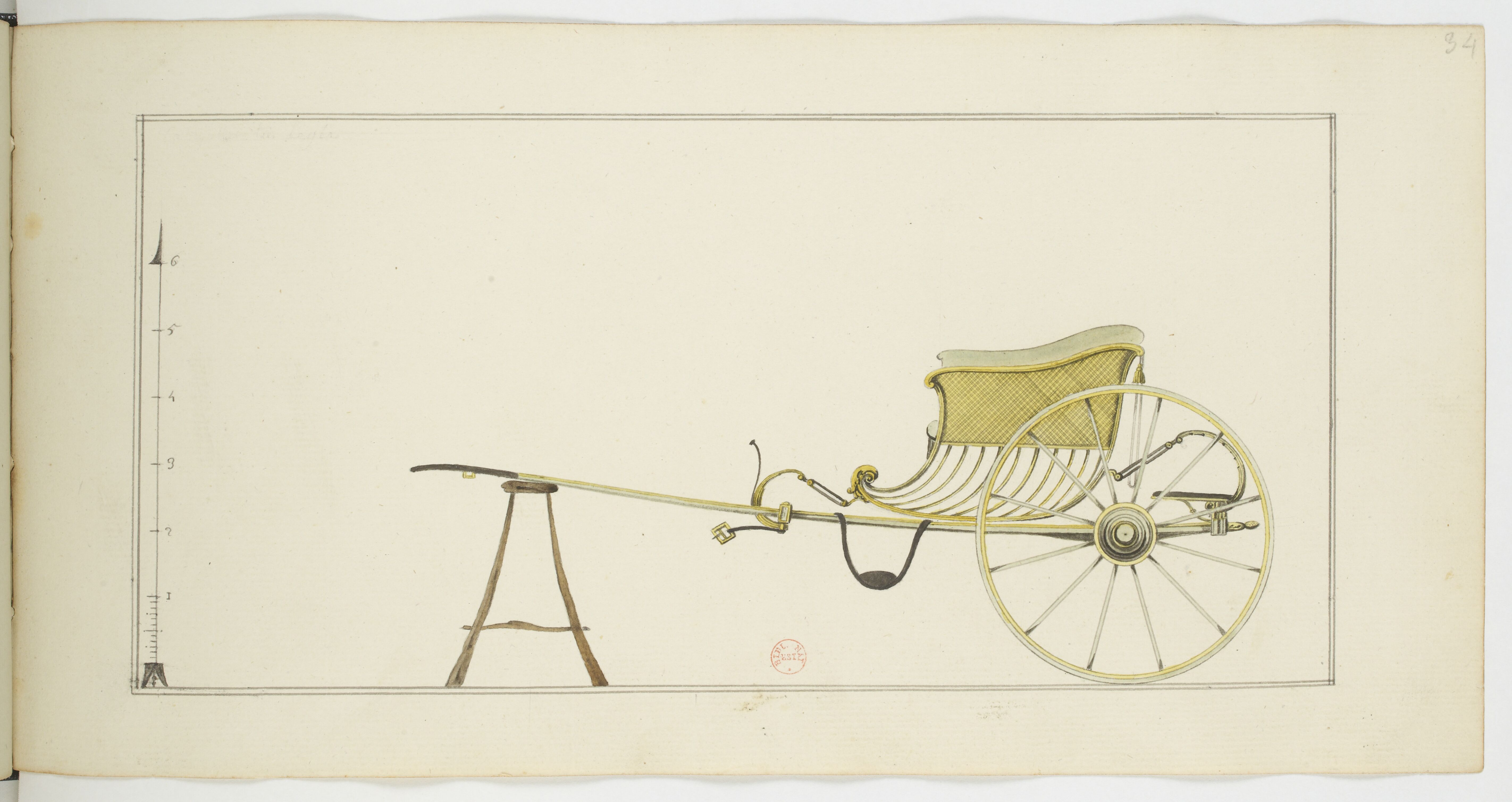
French design

== Whiskey ==
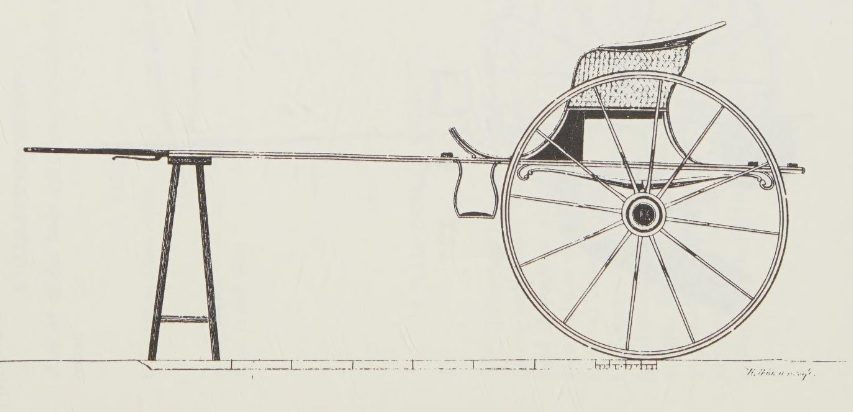
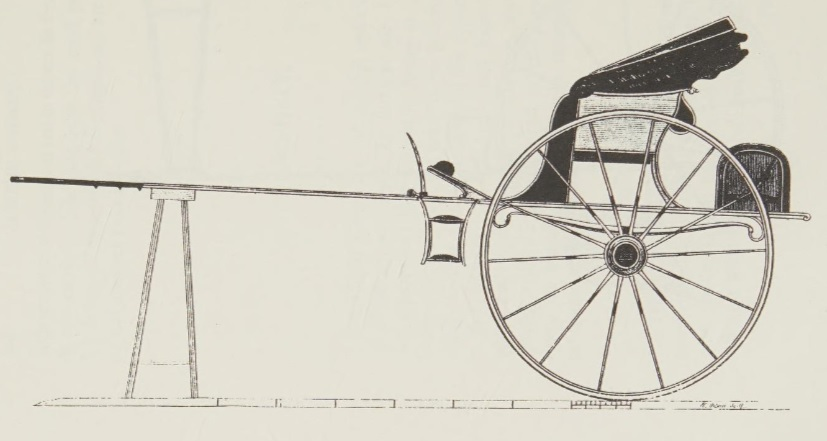
A cane whiskey (top), and a half-panel whiskey with a falling hood

A whiskey (also spelled whisky, plural whiskies) was a lightweight two-wheeled chaise that seated one or two persons. It was so named because it would "whisk" along at great speeds. It was often constructed with caned sides and no dashboard which further lightened the vehicle. Shafts were fitted under the body and it was hung on shallow-sideways platform springs. It was popular in the late 18th and early 19th centuries.

== American shay ==
According to Berkebile, "The chaise was one of the most popular vehicles used in colonial America and did not pass from the scene until the mid-nineteenth century. It was widely used by all social classes." In America, the chaise was constructed with a standing or falling hood, whereas the same vehicle without a hood was called a chair. The body was either directly on the shafts or used leather thoroughbraces, or was constructed with wooden cantilever springs and braces which is thought to be an American development.

The vehicle was commonly called a shay in New England, and the word shay was further popularized by Oliver Wendell Holmes's 1858 poem The Deacon's Masterpiece, or The Wonderful One-Hoss Shay.

"Shay" was also a term used in Nova Scotia. One memoirist writes of an early 19th century judge using "a vehicle, then generally called a chaise, or as a rustic would style it, a shay."

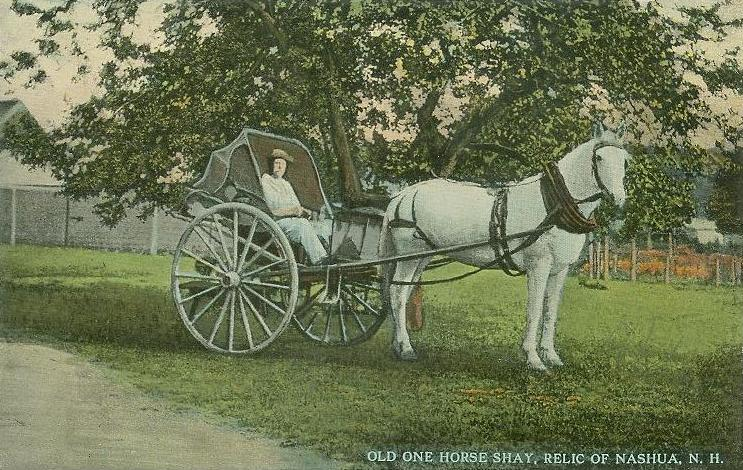
An American shay showing the wooden cantilever suspension style

=== One-hoss shay ===
In economics, the term "one-hoss shay" is used, following the scenario in Holmes' poem, to describe a model of depreciation, in which a durable product delivers the same services throughout its lifetime before failing, or being retired, with no salvage value.

== See also ==
- Bath chair—Early form of wheelchair sometimes called a chaise or handchaise
- Post chaise—A coach for long distance travel using posting stations
