= Friesian Sporthorse =

Breed of horse

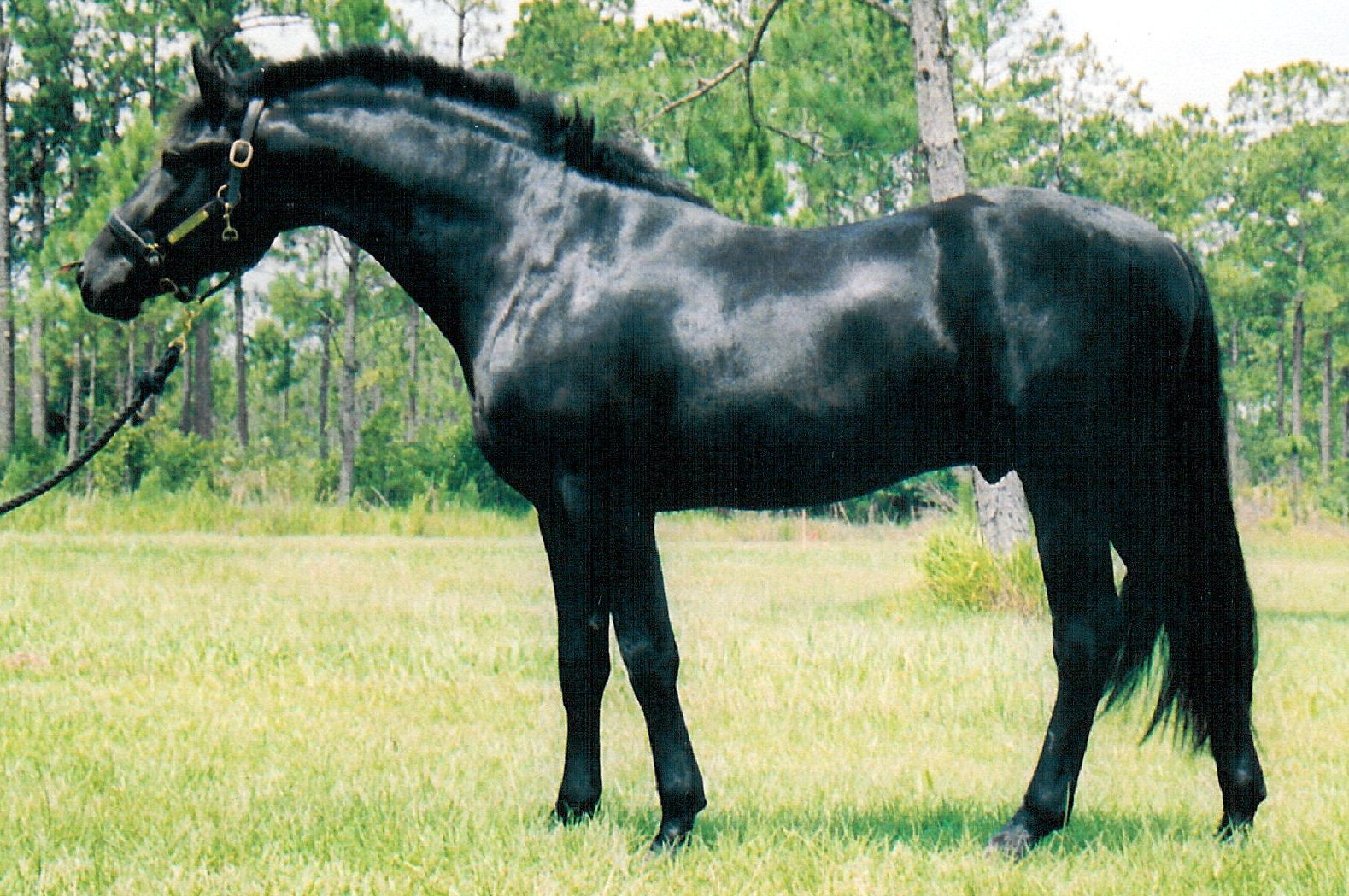
- Friesian Sporthorse Stallion
- Country of origin: developed initially in Europe (primarily Germany and the Netherlands) but revitalization and development as a unique breed has been primarily in the United States and Canada

Traits
- Distinguishing features: Friesian crossbreds, minimum 25% Friesian. Can be nearly all colors and sizes, but maintaining a sport horse type. Light feathering is common, as well as thick manes and tails.

The Friesian Sporthorse is a Friesian crossbred of sport horse type. The ideal Friesian Sporthorse is specifically bred to excel in FEI-recognized sport horse disciplines. Thus, "sporthorse" refers to the phenotype, breeding, and intended use of these horses. The term "Friesian Sport Horse" is a generic term to describe any Friesian-cross horse.

== Characteristics ==
Friesian Sporthorses can come in a variety of colors and sizes, with no limitations on acceptable colors or markings. Their body type can range from a sport horse build to a heavier build. A higher-set and more arched neck is also common among Friesian Sporthorses. They tend to have the gentle temperament and striking appearance of the Friesian, but with an increased athleticism, stamina, and hybrid vigor, when responsibly crossbred. They are most commonly used for dressage and carriage driving, but have also been successful as jumpers and eventing horses, as well as for all-around riding. They are also valued as pleasure and trail horses.

== History ==
People have been crossbreeding Friesians for more than a century. In 1879 the Friesian registry created two books for registration, one book for purebred Friesians, and another book for crossbreds. Crossbreeding had become so common by 1907 that the rules were again changed, combining the two books into one book again. This changed again in 1915, with concerns over the potential extinction of the purebred Friesian, and two books were again created. Eventually two separate Friesian registries were created, Dutch and German.

Today the Dutch Friesian registry (FPS, Friese Paarden Stamboek) and its American counterpart (FHANA, Friesian Horse Association North America) prohibit their registered horses from being used to create crossbred horses. However, the German Friesian registry (FPZV, Friesenpferde Zuchtverband e. V.) and its American counterpart (FPZV USA) do allow their registered horses to be crossbred with other breeds, but they will not register the crossbred offspring. Both the Dutch and German registries have recognized the severe risks of inbreeding this has created in the breed, and have created policy committees to try to reduce these risks.

In the last decade, the popularity of the Friesian crossbreds has increased, and additional registries have been formed specifically to register and recognize Friesian cross horses and Friesian Sporthorses as separate breeds.

The studbook for Friesian Sporthorses was founded in 2007 by the Friesian Sporthorse Association (FSA) and in 2008 the FSA trademarked the name "Friesian Sporthorse". The Friesian Sporthorse Association was initially founded in the United States, but shortly thereafter a branch was added in Australia, and the Friesian Sporthorse Association now registers Friesian Sporthorses worldwide.

== Bloodlines ==
Different registries have different standards that define what is considered to be a Friesian Sporthorse. One registry regards Friesian Sporthorses as a breed, with strict breeding requirements in addition to performance recognition. In this case, Friesians are crossbred primarily with warmbloods and Thoroughbreds, although limited percentages of American Saddlebred, draft and Arabian breeding are also acceptable into lower books of the studbook.

Other registries contend that "sporthorse" is a type, and rather than breed-specific requirements, they require that horses meet certain performance requirements before the registry will deem them a Friesian Sporthorse. Either way, the goal is to produce animals suitable for the sport disciplines of dressage, eventing, show jumping, and combined driving. Most registries agree that Friesian Sporthorses also must be a minimum of 25% Friesian. Although the crossbreeding of Friesians with many different types and breeds is popular, the resulting offspring are not always considered Friesian Sporthorses.
