= Friesian horse =

Breed of horse

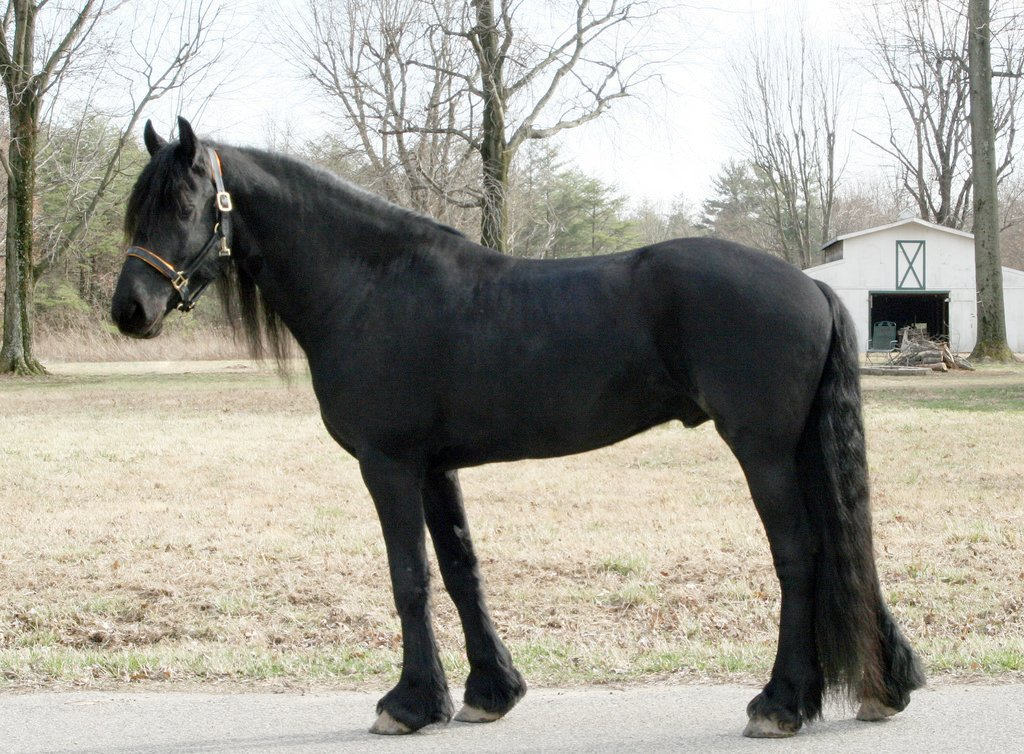

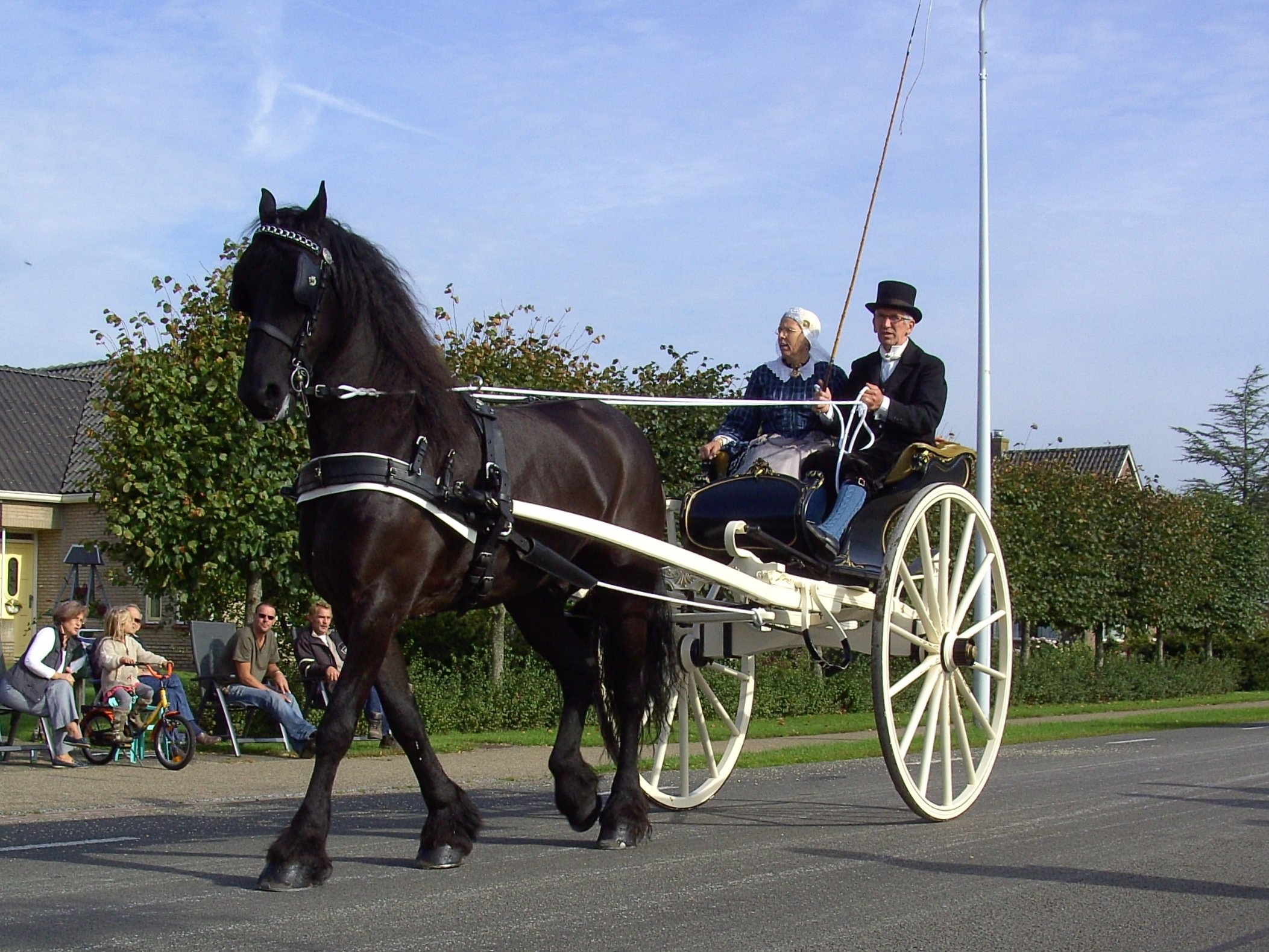
- Country of origin: The Netherlands

Traits
- Height: 15 to 16 hands (60 to 64 inches, 152 to 163 cm)
- Colour: Black
- Distinguishing features: Black, well-muscled, thick mane and tail, feather on lower legs, and high action

Breed standards
- Friesian Horse Association of North America

The Friesian (Fries paard in Dutch; Frysk hynder in West Frisian) is a horse breed originating in the province of Friesland in the northern Netherlands. The breed nearly became extinct on more than one occasion. It is classified as a light draught horse, and the modern-day Friesian horse is used for riding and driving. This breed is most known for its all-black coat colour, long, flowing mane and tail, feathering on its legs, high head carriage, and high-stepping action.

== Breed characteristics ==
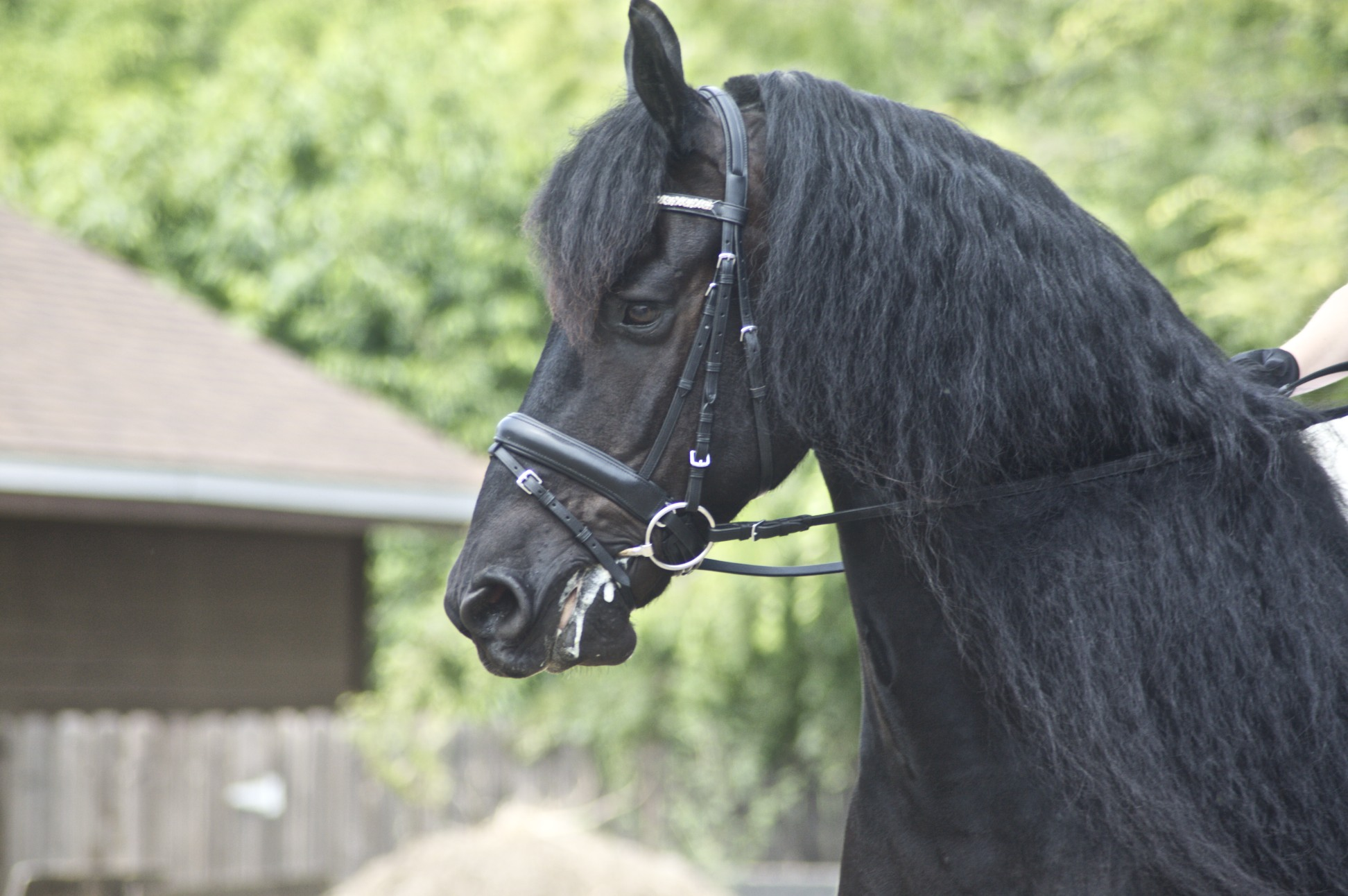
The head

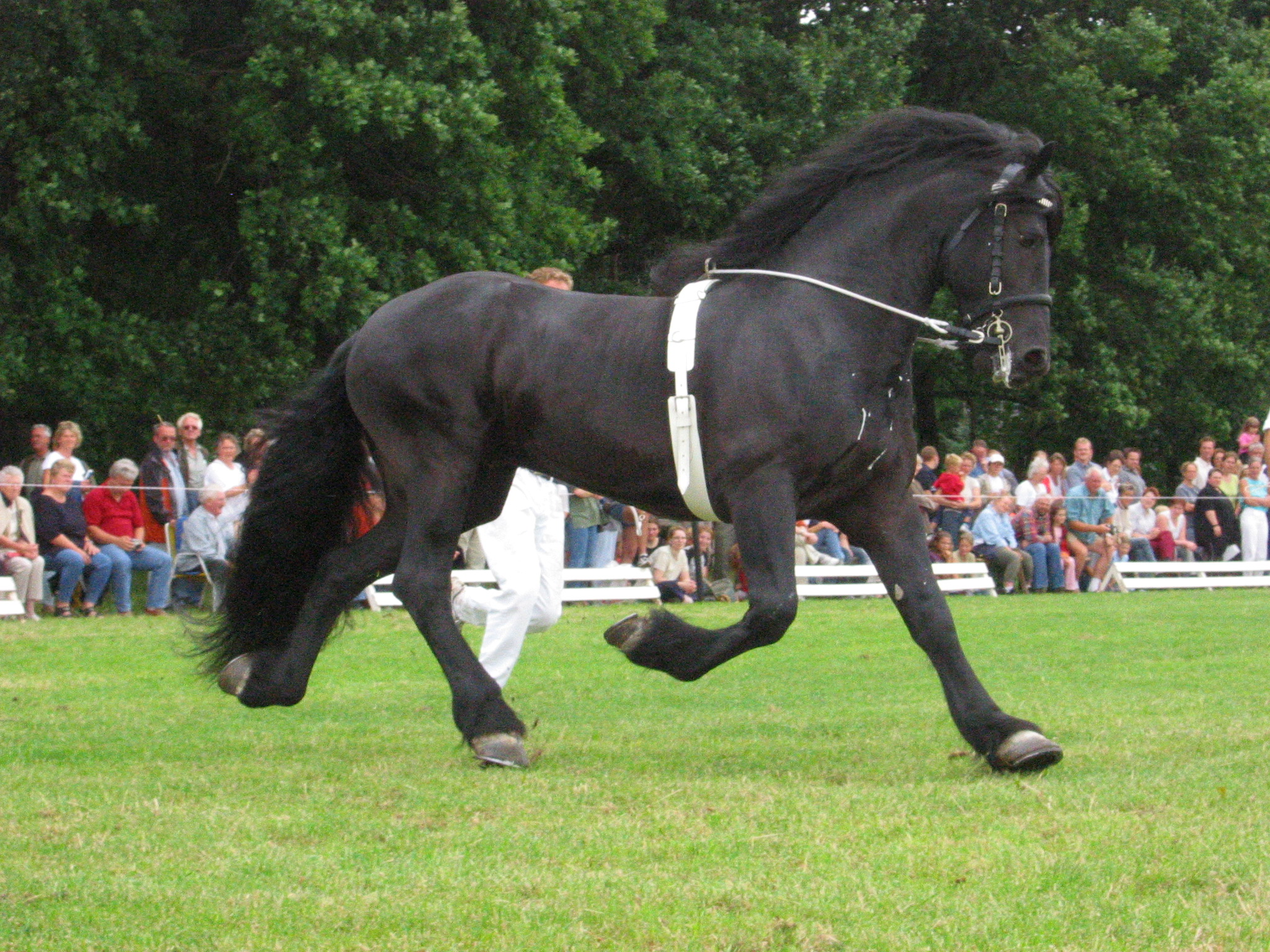
A Friesian being shown in-hand

The Friesian is black with no white markings, stands typically 15 to 16 hands (60 to 64 inches, 152 to 163 cm) at the withers, and weighs 1,250-1,450 pounds. The breed is compact and muscular with good bone. Friesians have long, arched necks, small ears, and straight, long heads. They have sloping shoulders and hindquarters and a low-set tail. Limbs are short and strong, with feathering (long hair) on the lower legs. A Friesian horse also has a thick mane and tail. The breed is known for a brisk, high-stepping trot. The Friesian is considered willing, active, and energetic, but also gentle and docile.

=== Colour variations ===
Though Friesian horses have for decades been characteristically black, starting in 1991, an occasional chestnut foal was born. Friesch Paarden Stamboek (FPS) began to breed out the chestnut colour by requiring stallions to undergo genetic testing and denying registration of those that carry the chestnut genes. The former American Friesian Association, which closed its business in 2015 and was not affiliated with the FPS, allowed horses with white markings and chestnut colouration to be registered if purebred parentage could be proven.

=== Genetic disorders ===
Four genetic disorders are acknowledged by the industry that may affect horses of Friesian breeding - dwarfism, hydrocephalus, a tendency for aortic rupture, and megaesophagus. Genetic tests are available for the first two conditions. The Friesian is also among several breeds that may develop equine polysaccharide storage myopathy. About 0.25% of Friesians are affected by dwarfism, which results in horses with a normal-sized head, a broader chest than normal, an abnormally long back, and very short limbs. It is a recessive condition. Additionally, the breed has a higher-than-usual rate of digestive-system disorders, and a greater tendency to have insect bite hypersensitivity. Like other feathered draught breeds, they are prone to a skin condition called verrucous pastern dermatopathy and may be generally prone to having a compromised immune system. Friesian mares have a very high (54%) rate of retained placenta after foaling. Some normal-sized Friesians also have a propensity toward tendon and ligament laxity, which may be associated with dwarfism. The relatively small gene pool and inbreeding are thought to be factors behind most of these disorders.

== Breed history ==
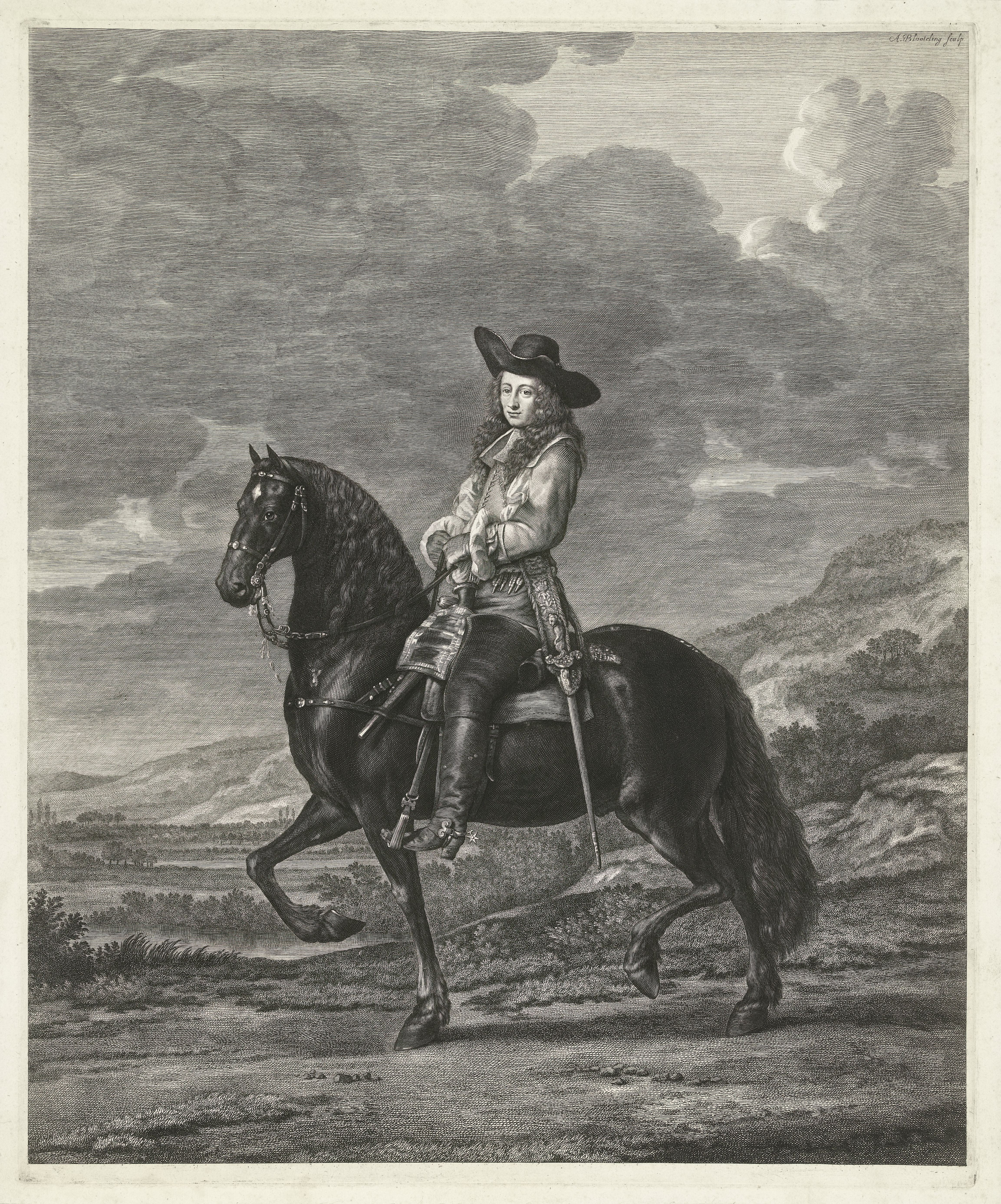
A 17th-century portrait of Dutchman Pieter Schout riding a Friesian style horse

The Friesian originates in the province of Friesland in the northern Netherlands, which has evidence of thousands of years of horse populations.

As far back in history as the fourth century, mentions had been made of Friesian troops who rode their own horses. One of the most well-known sources of this was by English writer Anthony Dent, who wrote about the Friesian mounted troops in Carlisle. Dent, amongst others, wrote that the Friesian horse was the ancestor of both the British Shire Horse and Fell Pony, but this is speculation.

Illustrations of what appeared to be Friesians did not appear until the 11th century. Many of the illustrations depict knights riding horses that resemble the breed, with one of the most famous examples being William the Conqueror.

These ancestors of the modern Friesians were used in medieval times to carry knights to battle. In the 12th and 13th centuries, some eastern horses of crusaders were mated with Friesian stock. During the 16th and 17th centuries, when the Netherlands were briefly linked with Spain, demand for heavy war horses decreased, as battle arms changed and became lighter. Andalusian horses were bred with Friesians, producing lighter horses more suitable for work as urban carriage horses.

Historian Ann Hyland wrote of the Friesian breed:

The Emperor Charles (reigned 1516–56) continued Spanish expansion into the Netherlands, which had its Frisian warhorse, noted by Vegetius and used on the continent and in Britain in Roman times. Like the Andalusian, the Frisian bred true to type. Even with infusions of Spanish blood during the 16th century, it retained its indigenous characteristics, taking the best from both breeds. The Frisian is mentioned in 16th- and 17th-century works as a courageous horse eminently suitable for war, lacking the volatility of some breeds or the phlegm of very heavy ones. Generally black, the Frisian was around 15hh with strong, cobby conformation, but with a deal more elegance and quality. The noted gait was a smooth trot coming from powerful quarters. Nowadays, though breed definition is retained, the size has markedly increased, as has that of most breeds due to improved rearing and dietary methods.

The breed was especially popular in the 18th and 19th centuries, when they were in demand not only as harness horses and for agricultural work, but also for the trotting races so popular then. In the 1800s, the Friesian was bred to be lighter and faster for trotting, but this led to what some owners and breeders regarded as inferior stock, so a movement to return to pureblood stock took place at the end of the 19th century.

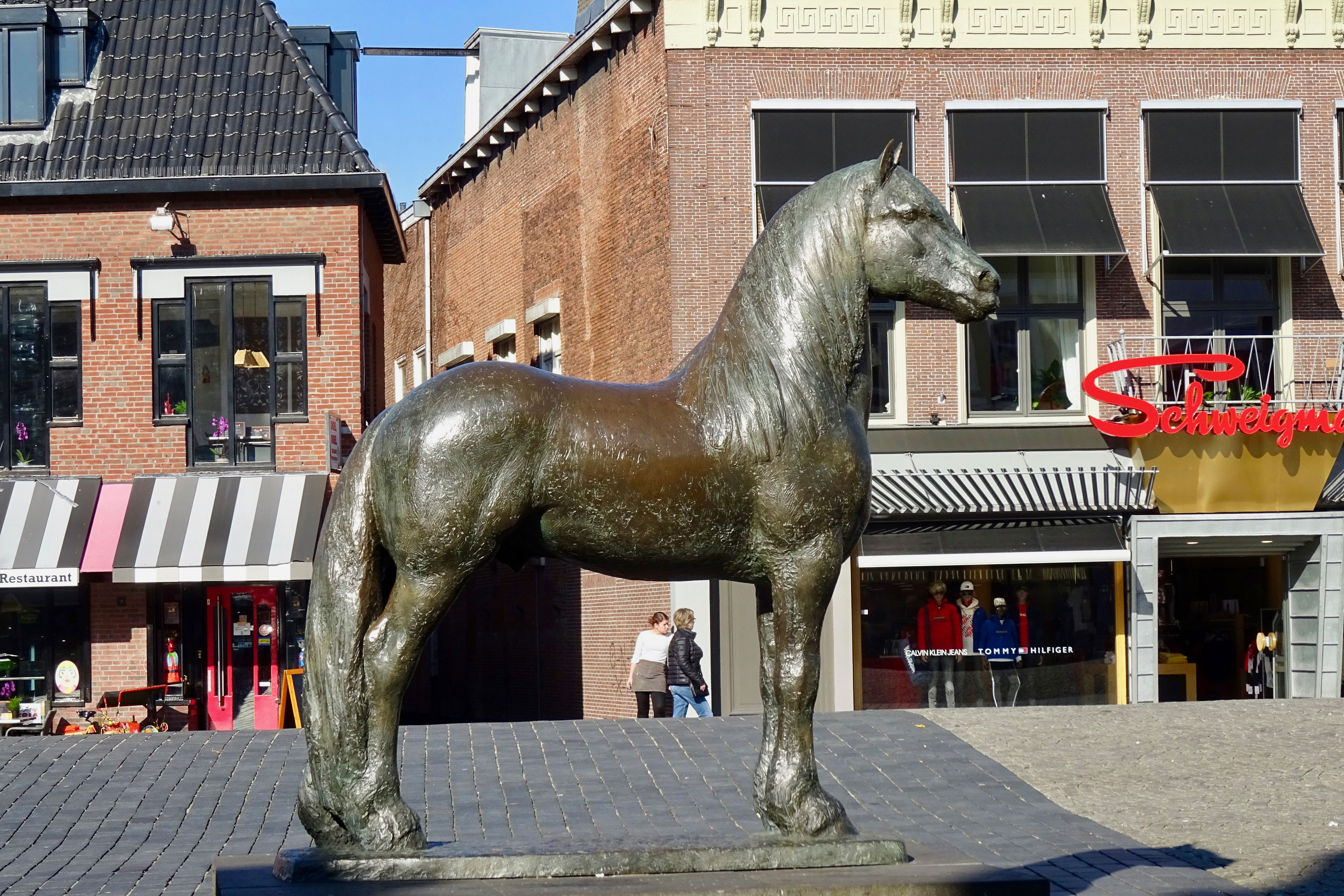
Statue in Leeuwarden honouring the 100th anniversary of the modern Friesian studbook

A studbook society was founded in 1879 by Frisian farmers and landowners who had gathered to found the Fries Rundvee Stamboek (FRS) The Paardenstamboek (horse stud book) was published in 1880 and initially registered both Friesian horses and a group of heavy warmblood breeds, including Ostfriesen and Alt-Oldenburgers, collectively known as Bovenlanders. At the time, the Friesian horse was declining in numbers, and was being replaced by the more fashionable Bovenlanders, both directly and by crossbreeding Bovenlander stallions on Friesian mares. This had already virtually exterminated the pure Friesian in significant parts of the province in 1879, which made the inclusion of Bovenlanders necessary. While the work of the society led to a revival of the breed in the late 19th century, it also resulted in the sale and disappearance of many of the best stallions from the breeding area, and Friesian horse populations dwindled. By the early 20th century, the number of available breeding stallions was down to three. Therefore, in 1906, the two parts of the registry were joined, and the studbook was renamed the Friesch Paarden Stamboek (FPS) in 1907."

In 1913, a society, Het Friesch Paard, was founded to protect and promote the breed. By 1915, it had convinced FPS to split registration into two groups. By 1943, the breeders of non-Friesian horses left the FPS completely to form a separate association, which later became the Koninklijk Warmbloed Paardenstamboek Nederland (Royal Warmblood Studbook of the Netherlands.

Displacement by mechanical farm equipment on dairy farms also was a threat to the survival of Friesian horse. The last draught function performed by Friesians on a significant scale was on farms that raised dairy cattle. World War II slowed the process of displacement, allowing the population and popularity of the breed to rebound. Important in the initial stage of the recovery of the breed was due to the family-owned Circus Strassburger, who, having fled Nazi Germany for the Low Countries, discovered the show qualities of the breed and demonstrated its abilities outside of its local breeding area during and after the Nazi occupation.

== Uses ==
As use in agricultural pursuits declined, the Friesian became popular for recreational uses. Today, about 7% of the horses in the Netherlands are Friesians.

The Friesian horse today is used both in harness and under saddle, particularly in the discipline of dressage. In harness, they are used for competitive and recreational driving. A traditional carriage seen in some events designed for Friesian horses is a high-wheeled cart called a Sjees. Friesians are also used to pull vintage carriages at ceremonial events and parades.

Because of their colour and striking appearance, Friesian horses are a popular breed in movies and television, particularly in historic and fantasy dramas. They are viewed as calm in the face of the activity associated with filmmaking, but also elegant on-camera.

Friesian usage

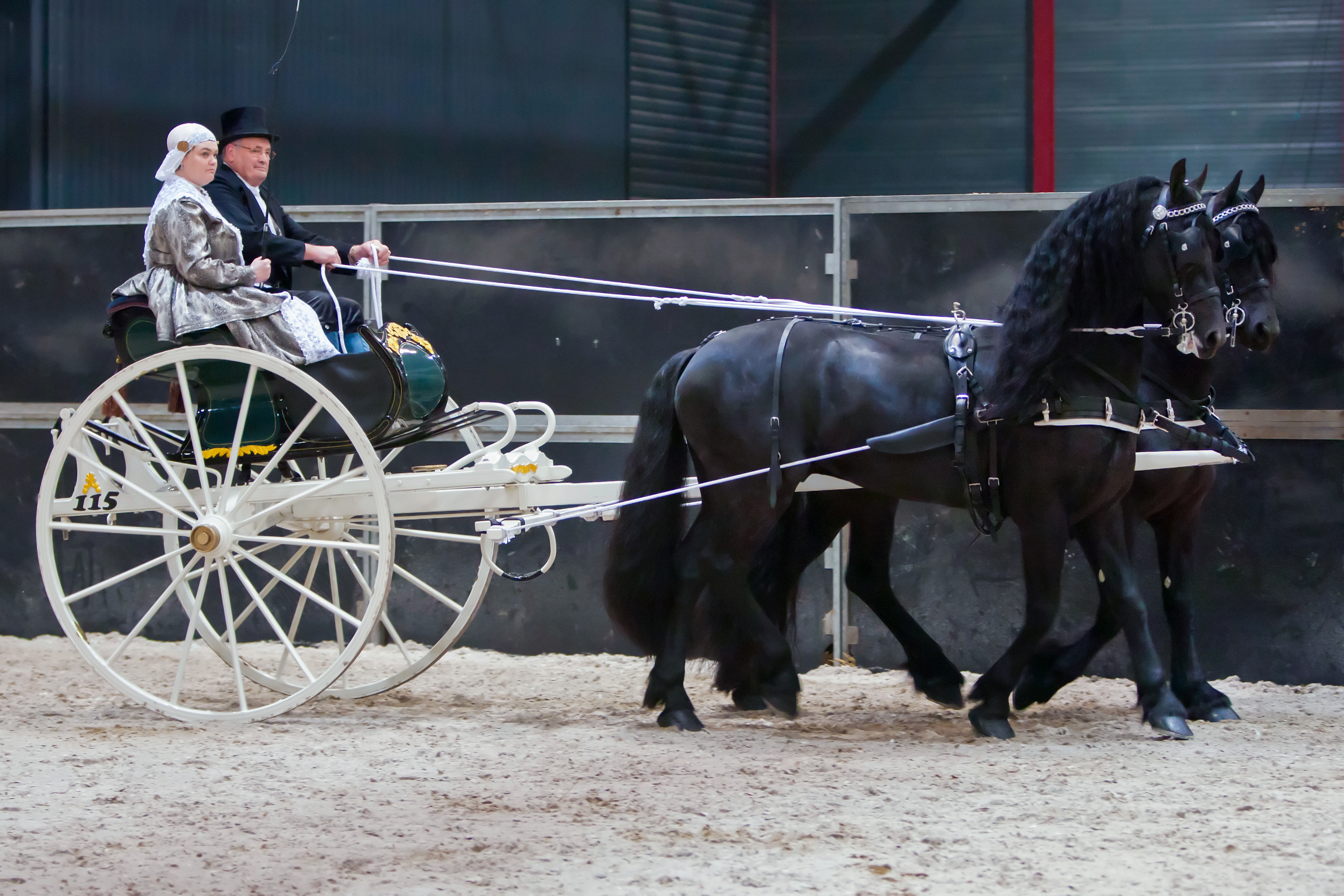
Friesian Sjees

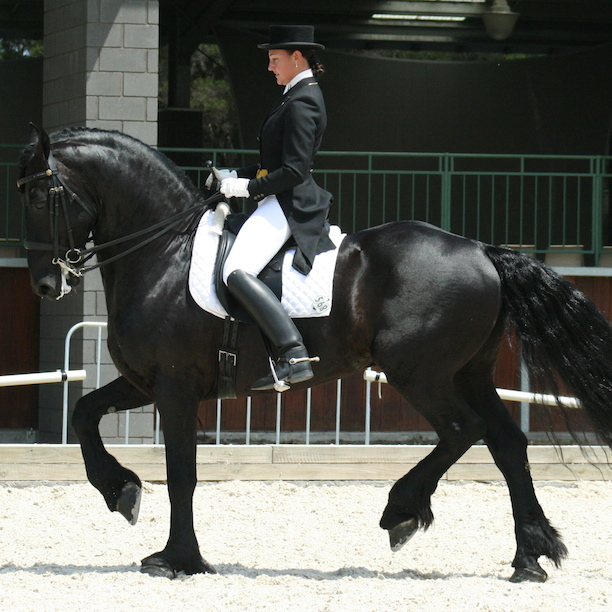
Competing in Grand Prix dressage

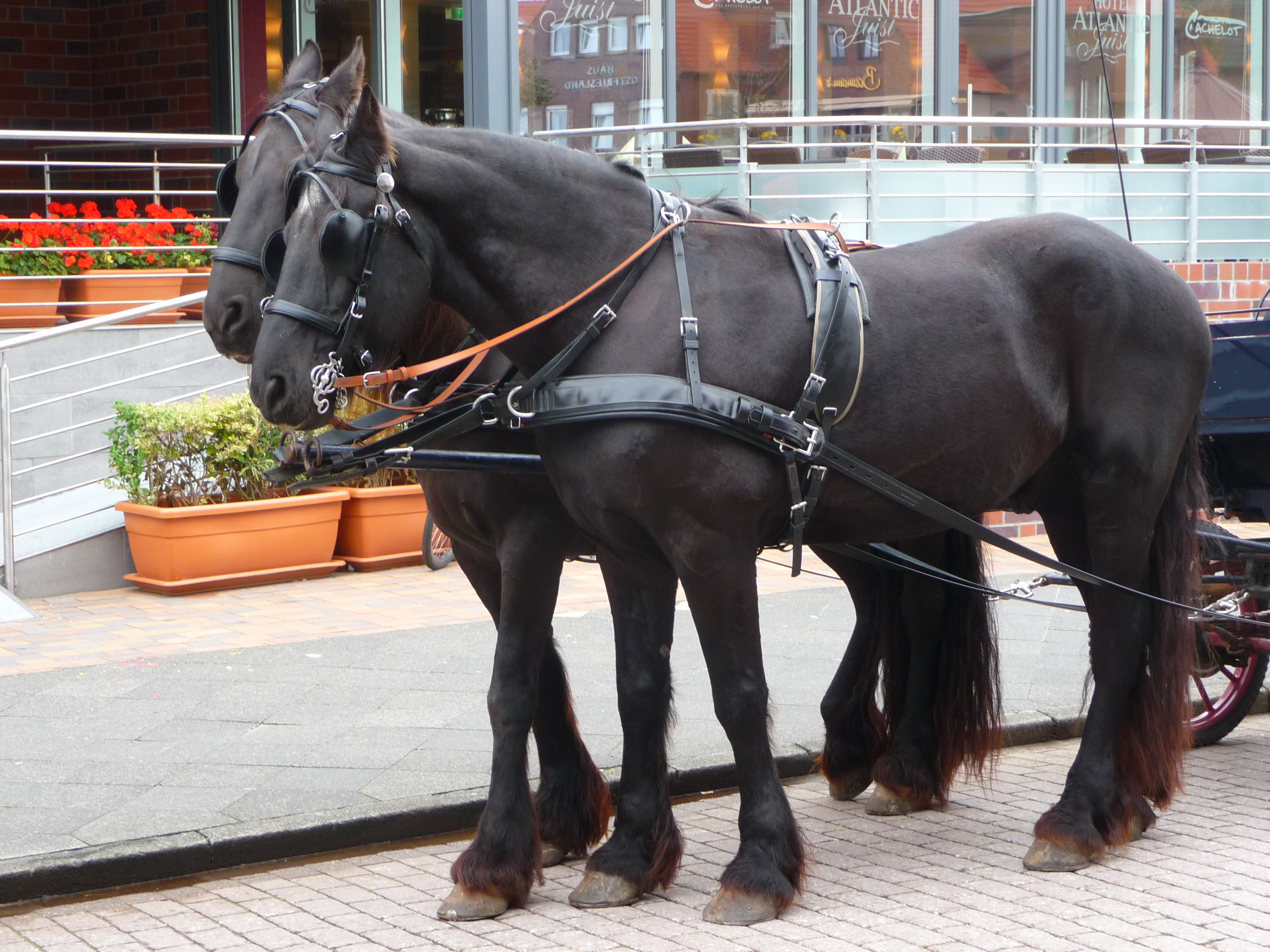
Pair of Friesians in harness

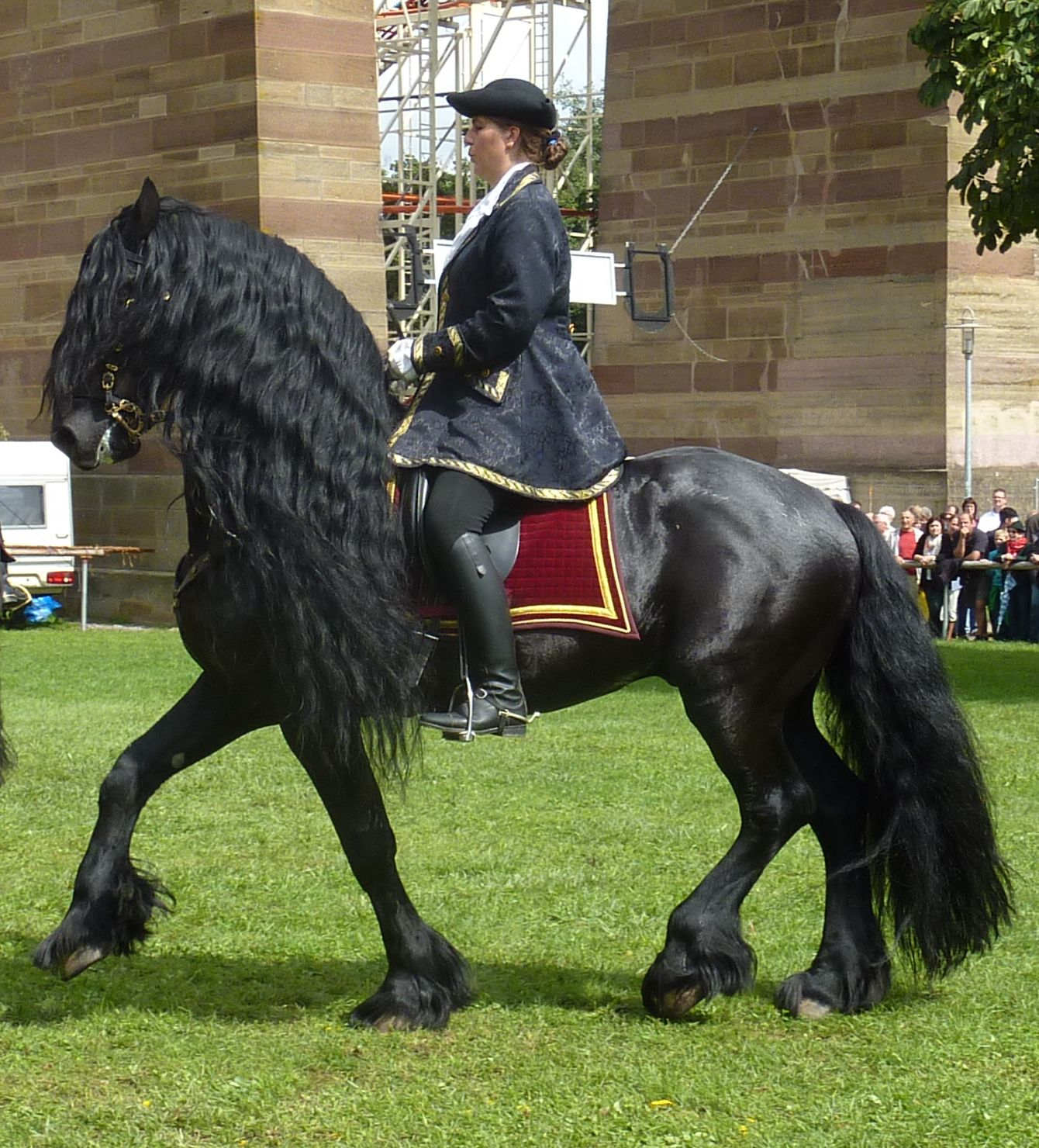
Pagentry

== Registration of breeding ==
A Friesian horse is defined as a horse that meets the breed description as described in the breeding goal and of which both parents are registered in one of the classes (of the main section) of the KFPS. —KFPS

Koninklijke Vereniging 'Het Friesch Paarden-Stamboek' (KFPS), which means "Royal Association, The Friesian Horse Studbook", is the original Friesian studbook founded in 1879 in the Netherlands and is the world-recognized official studbook for the Friesian horse breed. KFPS has licensed about 30 organizations around the world as authorized representatives to uphold its breeding program standards, record registrations and arrange horse evaluations. Most KFPS-registered horses are in the Netherlands, Germany and North America.

KFPS studbook breeding is strictly controlled, and breeding a KFPS-registered and approved stallion to any non-KFPS mares or to any other breed of horse is strongly discouraged. Other registries exist for Friesians and Friesian crossbreeds, but KFPS does not permit dual registration.

For a stallion to be approved as breeding stock, he must pass a rigorous approval process. Horses are judged at an inspection, or keuring, by Dutch judges, who decide whether the horse is worthy of breeding.

Multiple registries are within KFPS. The two main registries are the studbook for approved stallions, and the foalbook for horses from the mating of an approved stallion and a mare in the foalbook. The two auxiliary registries are:

- B-Book I is for horses from a mating with a limited-approved stallion. In countries where approved-stallion stock is low, some stallions are given limited breeding rights, and their offspring can be registered in B-Book I with the possibility of upgrading to a higher studbook grade after three successive generations of breeding by KFPS- approved studbook stallions. North America is one of the regions outside the Netherlands with a sufficient number of approved stallions available such that no B-Book I registering has occurred since 1992.
- B-Book II is for horses from the mating of two purebred Friesians, but the stallion is not approved. Such offspring must be registered directly with KFPS in the Netherlands.

A few special status awards can be obtained during evaluation events, such as a star predicate, which is awarded to a mare, gelding, or unapproved stallion that meets minimum standards of conformation, movement, and height; and a sport predicate is awarded to horses that have achieved certain performance goals in dressage or driving competitions.

KFPS-registered horses born prior to 1997 had tongue tattoos; horses born after have a microchip implant in the upper left neck. The tattoo or chip numbers are recorded on the registration papers. Names given to foals born in a certain year must begin with a fixed letter as determined by KFPS. Parentage is verified with DNA testing, and mares are DNA tested for hydrocephalus and dwarfism unless their sire and dam had both tested as noncarriers.

== See also ==
- Arabo-Friesian
- Friesian Sporthorse
- Vlaamperd
