= Sproing Interactive =

Austrian video game developer (2001–2017)

Sproing Interactive Media GmbH
- Company type: Private
- Industry: Video games
- Founded: 2001; 24 years ago
- Headquarters: Vienna, Austria
- Key people: Harald Riegler, Johanna Schober
- Number of employees: 100 (2016)

Sproing Interactive Media GmbH was an Austrian video game developer. It was founded in 2001 by Harald Riegler and Gerhard Seiler. Riegler and Seiler owned and managed the company until its closure in 2017. The company had its headquarters in Vienna, Austria.

Sproing published over 50 titles of varying scope. The company produced games for different platforms such as Wii, Xbox 360, PlayStation 3, PC, PlayStation 2, Xbox, Nintendo DS, PlayStation and Game Boy Advance. Panzer Tactics DS (released in 2008) was awarded the Deutscher Entwicklerpreis in the category Best German console-game. For autumn 2012, a third game of the show Schlag den Raab was announced, as both predecessors sold over 250,000 copies between them on various platforms. In November 2016, Sproing, at the time the largest game studio in Austria (with roughly 100 employees), filed for insolvency. It was succeeded by Purple Lamp Studios in 2018. The company was a member of the G.A.M.E. Bundesverband der Computerspielindustrie.

== Games (selection) ==
- Various Moorhuhn-Games
- 2003: Ultimate Winter Games
- 2004: Crazy Kickers
- Since 2005: Meine Tierarztpraxis-Series (e.g. Paws and Claws: Pet Vet)
- 2006: Undercover: Operation Wintersun (known as Undercover: Operation Wintersonne in German)
- 2006: Jacked
- 2007: Undercover: Dual Motives (known as Undercover: Doppeltes Spiel in German)
- 2008: Gallop & Ride
- 2008: Panzer Tactics DS
- 2009: Cursed Mountain
- 2010: Dance! It's Your Stage
- 2011: Schlag den Raab – Das 2. Spiel
- 2012: SkyRama
- 2012: North & South
- 2012: Schlag den Raab – Das 3. Spiel
- 2012: Silent Hunter-Online (Beta)
- 2013: Asterix & Friends
- 2016: Angry Birds Holiday (cancelled)
- 2017: Quarantine
- 2017: Nonstop Chuck Norris
- 2017: KISS - Rock City
