= Paws and Claws: Pet Vet =

2006 video game

- Developers: Independent Arts Software; DTP Entertainment; Neopica BVBA; Sproing Interactive Media; Radon Labs
- Publishers: THQ; ValuSoft (PC)
- Series: Paws and Claws
- Platforms: iOS, Game Boy Advance, Nintendo DS, Wii, Windows
- Release: February 13, 2006: Windows; NA: February 13, 2006 Nintendo DS; NA: January 3, 2007 Game Boy Advance; NA: 2007 iOS; NA: February 24, 2009 Wii; NA: August 18, 2009
- Genre: Pet-raising simulation
- Mode: Single-player

Paws and Claws: Pet Vet is a pet-raising simulation video game by German studio Radon Labs in which players can nurse dogs, cats, horses, birds, hamsters, guinea pigs and rabbits back to health. The game features 20 ailments. Players can design their own clinic, choose which kennels to build and expand existing buildings to provide further services to their patients.

== Gameplay ==
Players assume the role of a veterinarian running a pet clinic and must heal sick pets back to full health. At the beginning of the game, this involves treating smaller pets such as guinea pigs, hamsters, rabbits, and birds. As the player gains experience, larger animals such as horses, dogs, or cats become available. The clinic's facilities can be expanded and altered (for instance, the style of kennels used to house the animals). Expanding facilities enables more pets to be housed and increases the range of treatments available. Players are also responsible for managing the clinic's finances and supplies.

Each type of pet has a different type of task to be completed in order to heal them. Dogs can play fetch and be taken for a run to increase their fitness and horses can be ridden and taken out to the pasture. The Nintendo DS version utilizes voice recognition via the inbuilt microphone to issue commands to pets as well as to calm them during treatment.

There are six available buildings to construct and expand: the practice, the therapy house, the small animal house, the cat house, the dog house, and the horse stalls. In town, there are nine stores to conduct business and train players' characters.

During the game, players can learn about different diseases and ailments. Ailments include fungus infection, Vitamin E deficiency, ear inflammation, mold infection, rabbit flu, lung infection, corneal injury, liver infection, sunburn, asthma, and tonsil infections. As players move through the game, they are able to keep animals in animal houses for prolonged treatment. In the small animal house, they may keep guinea pigs, rabbits, or birds that have more serious injuries and diseases. When animals are in the animal houses, players must treat and feed them every day.

The game has a large playing world in which the character's actions are constrained by what time of day it is in-game. The clinic opens and closes at certain times of day, and if players wait too long to service a customer, they will leave the clinic. Patients must be healed in a certain amount of time, and customers will not pay their bill if players do not heal their animals.

=== Characters ===
In the game, players assume one of three characters: Hanna, Alex or Sophie. As one of these characters, players have many responsibilities to the clinic and the animals they are treating. They can dress the character for work, riding a horse, or for leisure. Players can also make them walk with the arrow keys or run while holding shift and using the arrow keys.

=== Settings ===
The game takes place in town, the animal practice, small animal house, cat house, therapy center, dog house, horse barn, fields and meadows, the forest, the beach, and town outskirts. The fields, meadows, practice, and town are the areas of the world that do not have to be purchased. The small animal house, cat house, therapy center, dog house, and horse barn are things that players must purchase using the money they receive from treating patients. The forest, beach and town outskirts are areas players can eventually earn by completing objectives.
