= Sjees =

Dutch horse cart

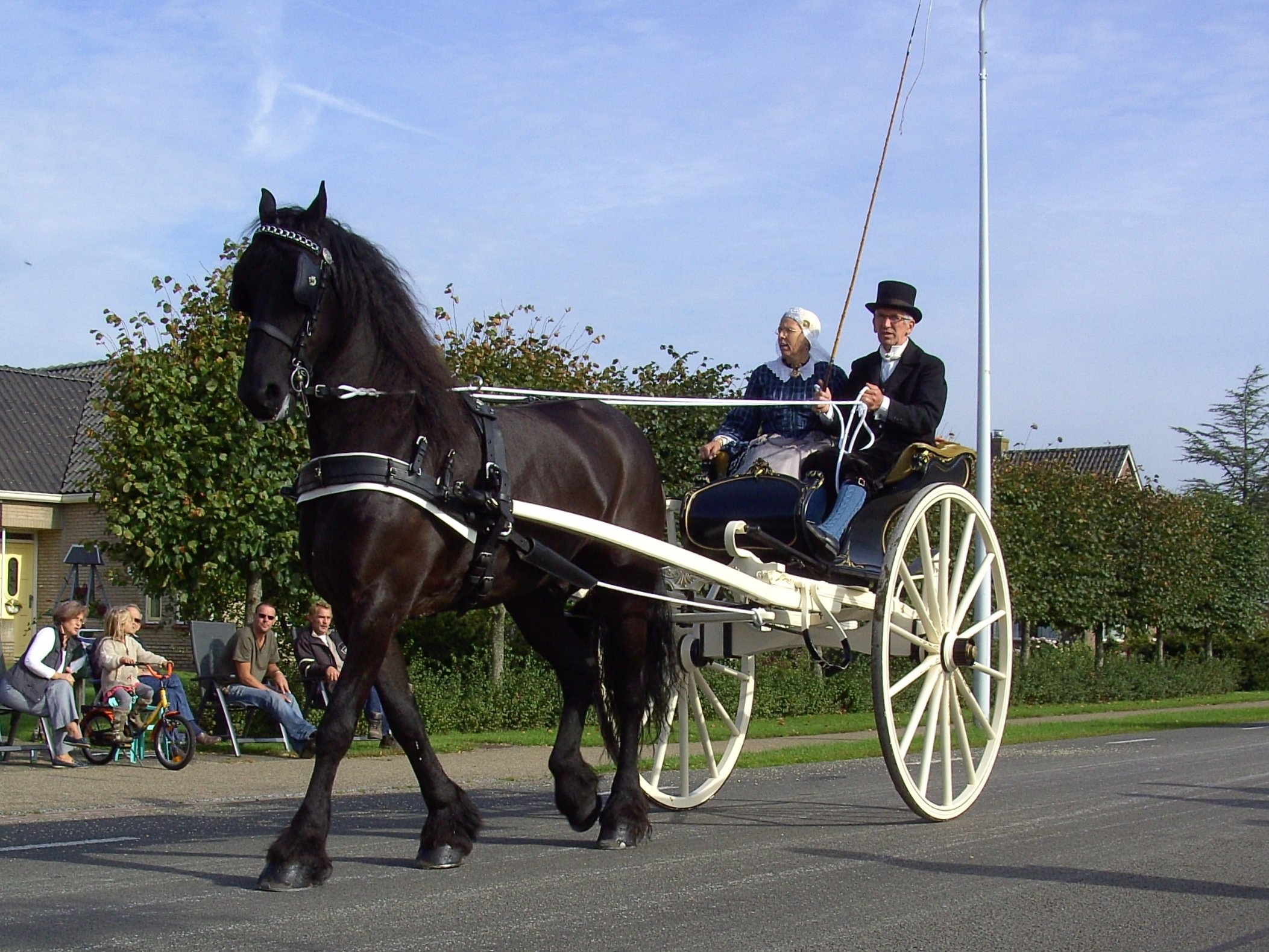
Sjees with single horse

A Sjees (from Dutch, meaning chaise) is a Dutch traditional two-wheeled carriage pulled by one or two horses, which originates from Friesland in the north of Netherlands. Also called a Friesian chaise, it resembles a chaise or gig carriage but with unique regional distinctions. The undercarriage, wooden axle, large wheels, and shafts are usually painted white. The body, which is supported on cee-springs and leather braces, has a curved dash and seats two people. Typically, the body is decorated with elaborate painting, gilding and carvings, and the upholstery is brightly colored velvet or leather.

The sjees is customarily driven with black Friesian horses, either one horse in shafts, or two on either side of a pole. The harness is a breast collar style, decorated with white trim, and white rope is used for the reins and traces.

When using this chaise carriage with a pair arrangement of horses, it uses a metal bracket as a kind of yoke underneeth the bellies of the horses, hence the dutch name: 'beugelsjees' (bracket chaise).

Sjees

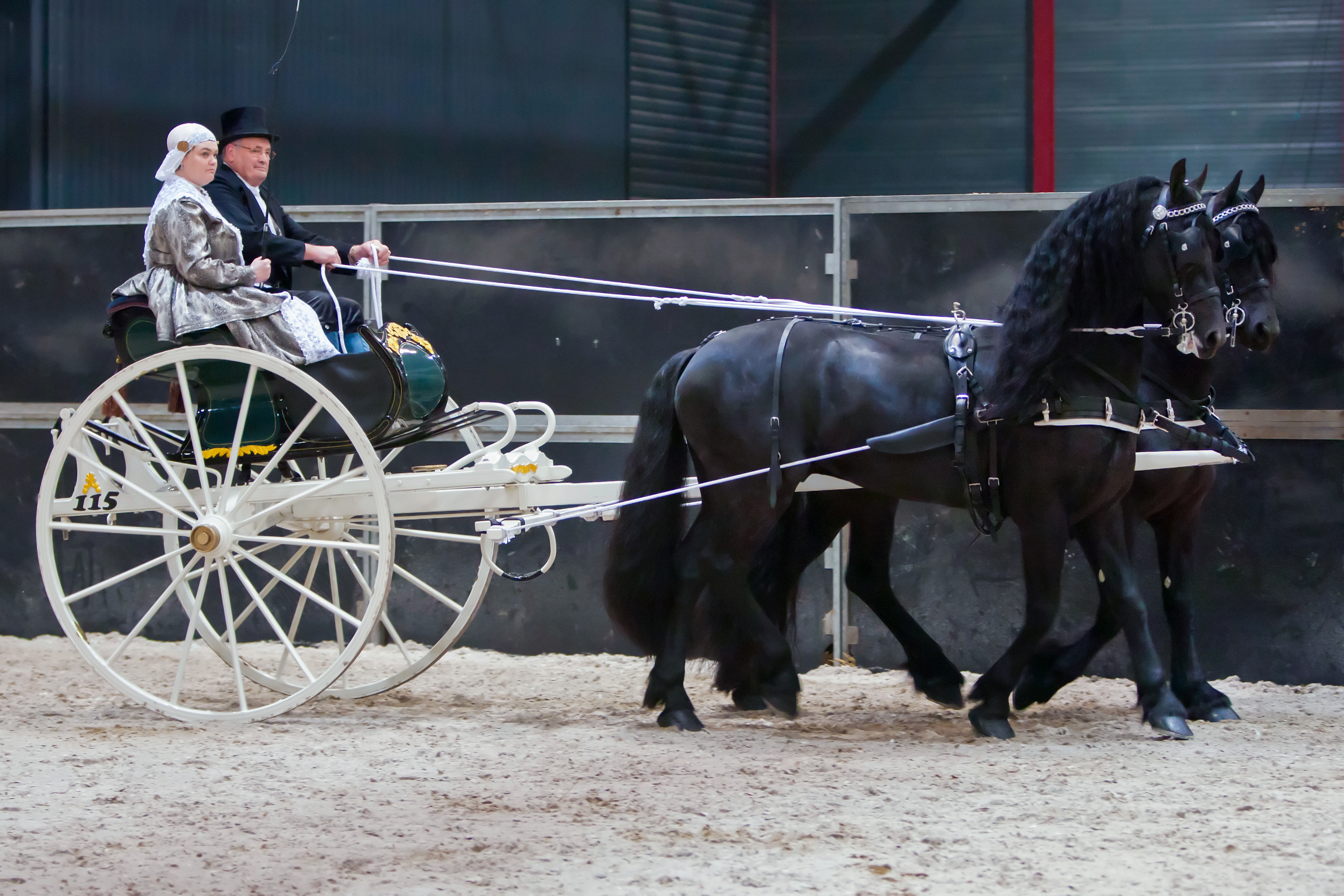
Sjees with pair of horses

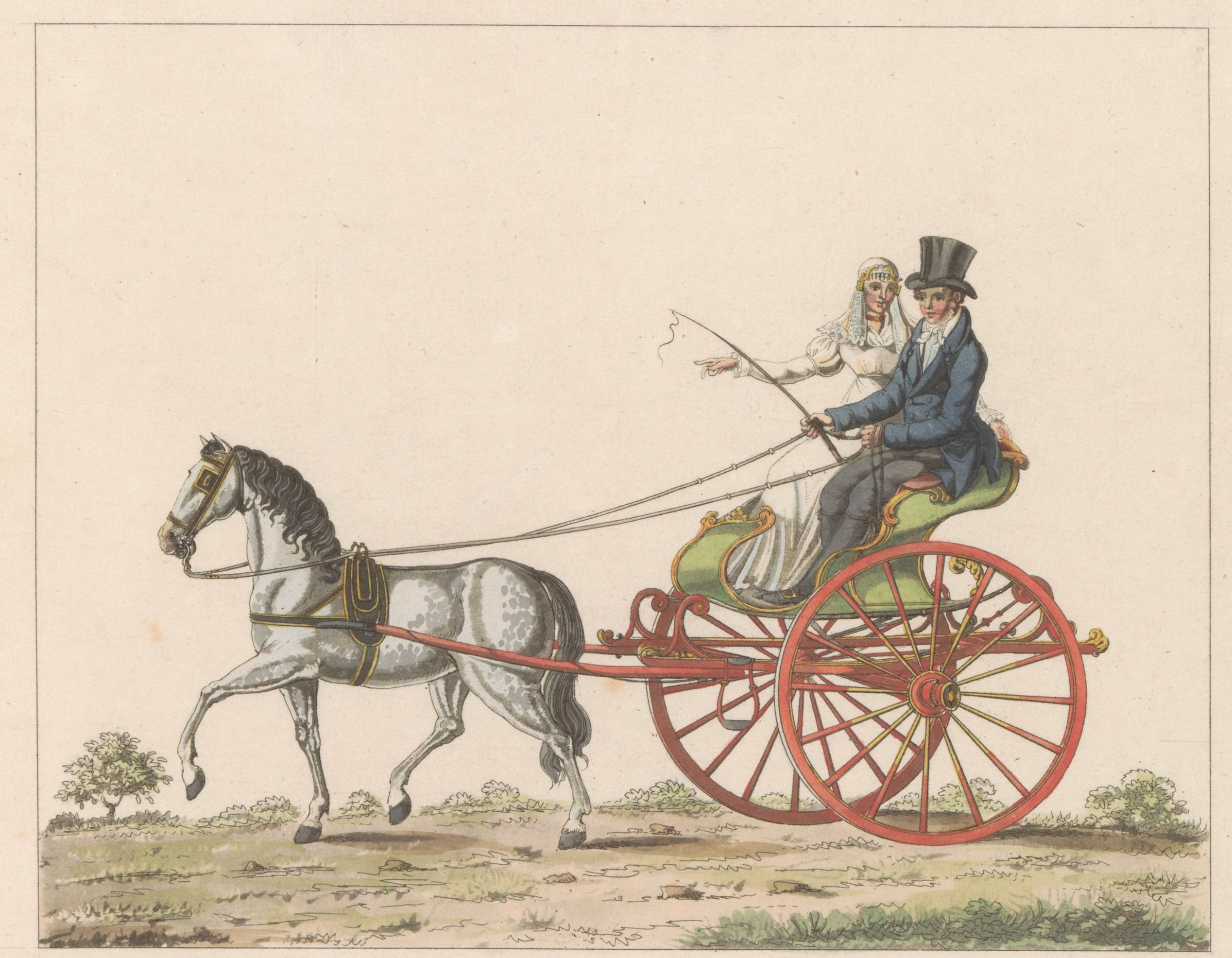
c. 1825 print depicting a sjees

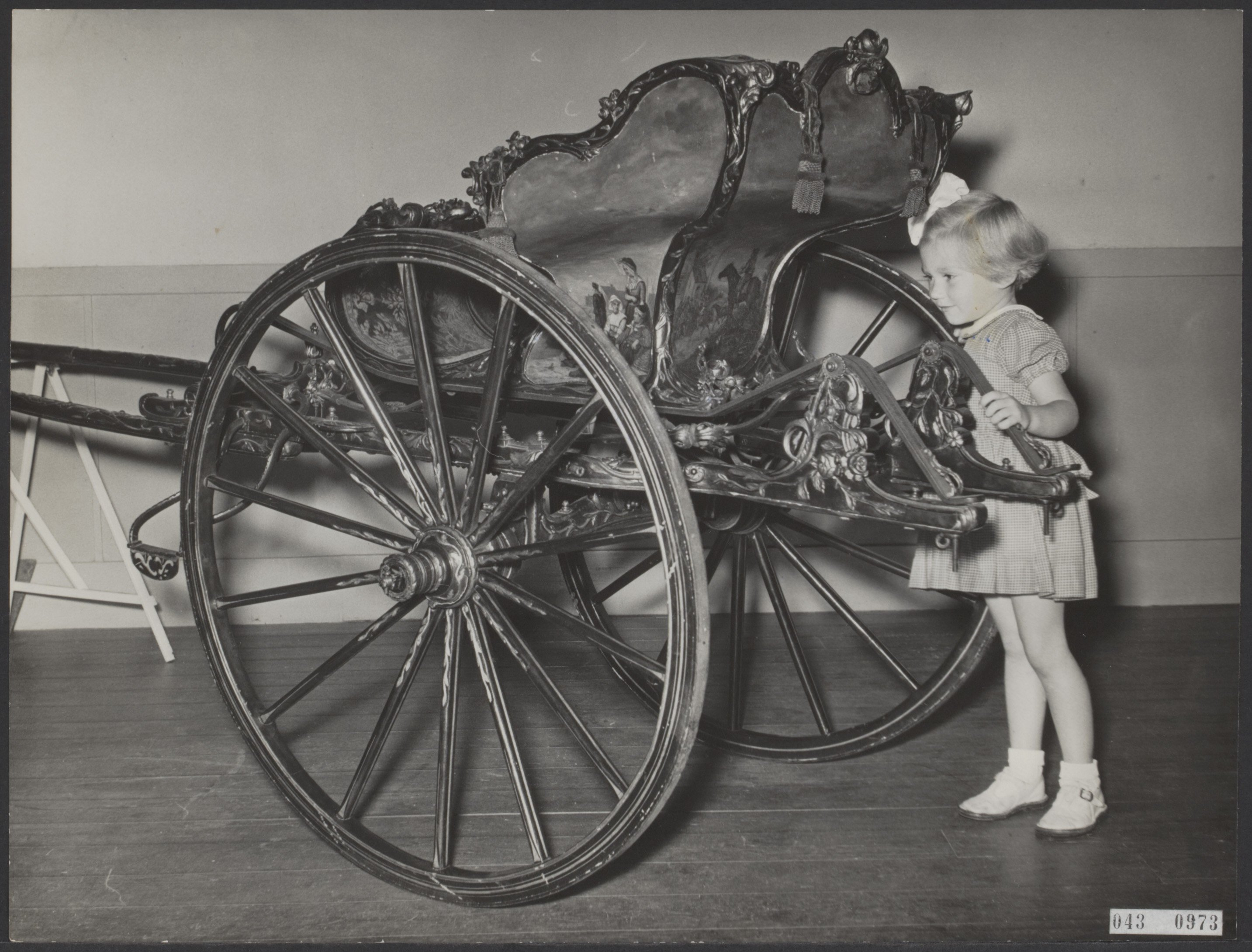
Elaborate decorations on this sjees
