= History of horse-drawn transport =

The history of horse-drawn transport has developed from antiquity to the present. For thousands of years, horse-drawn vehicles were the dominant means of overland travel, serving military, ceremonial, commercial, and everyday purposes before the invention of mechanized transport. Early examples include the chariots and carts of the ancient Near East and Mediterranean. By the medieval period, carriages with suspension systems and pivoting axles were used by royalty and aristocracy, while wagons and carts were essential for trade and agriculture. In the early modern period, with the spread of improved road surfaces such as macadam and tarmacadam, coaches and stagecoaches expanded long-distance travel, and horse-drawn trams and omnibuses transformed urban mobility in the 19th century. Although largely replaced by railways and automobiles in the 20th century, horse-drawn vehicles continue to be used today in rural areas, and for ceremonial and recreational purposes.

== Cart history ==
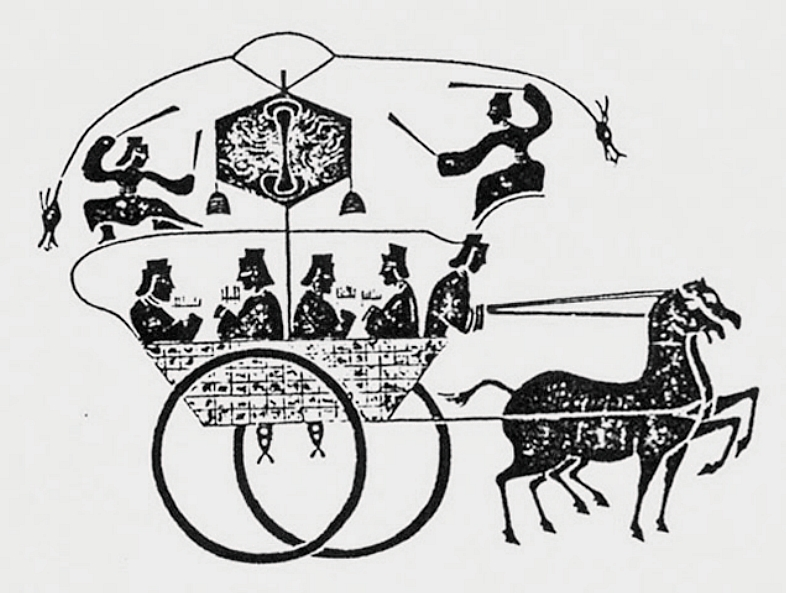
Stone rubbing of an ancient Chinese Han Dynasty horse cart

The history of the cart is closely tied to the invention of the wheel. Pre-dating the wheel there were dragged devices like sledges and travois. The earliest known wheels date back to around 3400 to 3000 BC. The combination of the wheel and axle enabled the development of early wheeled vehicles which transformed human mobility and trade. The earliest wheeled vehicles had four-wheels (wagons), however two-wheeled vehicles (carts) required about 40% less pulling force than a four-wheeled vehicle of the same weight and were more maneuverable.

With the domestication of animals such as oxen and horses, carts became central to ancient economies. Animal-drawn carts and wagons were widely used across civilizations for farming, trade, and migration. Their evolution—from solid wooden wheels to lighter spoked designs—marked a major technological advance, improving efficiency and enabling long-distance transport.

Some horse carts found in Celtic graves show hints that their platforms were suspended elastically.

First prototyped in the 3rd millennium BC, a bullock cart is a large two-wheeled cart pulled by oxen or buffalo. It includes a sturdy wooden pole between the oxen, a yoke connecting a pair of oxen, a wooden platform for passengers or cargo, and large steel rimmed wooden wheels.

Two-wheeled carriage models have been discovered from the Indus Valley Civilisation including twin horse drawn covered carriages resembling ekka from various sites such as Harappa, Mohenjo Daro and Chanhu Daro. The earliest recorded sort of carriage was the chariot, reaching Mesopotamia as early as 1900 BC. Used typically for warfare by Egyptians, the Near Easterners and Europeans, it was essentially a two-wheeled light basin carrying one or two standing passengers, drawn by one to two horses. The chariot was revolutionary and effective because it delivered fresh warriors to crucial areas of battle with swiftness.

== Bronze Age Europe ==
Horses may have been driven even earlier. The Standard of Ur, in ancient Sumer, c. 2500 BC, shows horses or some type of onager or donkey hitched to wheeled carts with a yoke around their necks, in a manner similar to that of oxen.

By the time of the Hyksos invasions of Egypt, c. 1600 BC, horses were pulling chariots with an improved harness design that made use of a breast collar and breeching, which allowed a horse to move faster and pull more weight. The breast collar style harness is still used today for pulling lightweight vehicles.

Throughout the ancient world, the 'throat-and-girth' harness was used for harnessing horses that pulled carts; but it greatly limited a horse's ability to exert itself as the horse was constantly choked at the neck. This harness, it was claimed, could be found in many ancient civilizations, according to early 20th century French cavalry officer Richard Lefebvre des Noëttes. This type of collar was supposedly used in ancient Chaldea, both Sumeria and Assyria (1400–800 BC), ancient Egypt during the New Kingdom (1570–1070 BC), Shang dynasty China (1600–1050 BC), Minoan Crete (2700–1450 BC), Classical Greece (550–323 BC), and ancient Rome (510 BC – 476 AD). With this "ancient harness", ploughs and carts were pulled using harnesses that had flat straps across the neck and chest of the animal, with the load attached at the top of the collar, above the neck, in a manner similar to an oxen's yoke. These straps pressed against the horse's sterno-cephalicus muscle and trachea which restricted its breathing and reduced the pulling power of the horse. Thus, the harder a horse pulled, the more strongly it choked off its own breathing. Because of these supposed physical constraints, oxen were preferred over horses for heavy work, as ox anatomy does not have this problem; standard yokes do not choke oxen.

Four-wheeled wagons were used in Bronze Age Europe, and their form known from excavations suggests that the basic construction techniques of wheel and undercarriage (that survived until the age of the motor car) were established then.

== Ancient Chinese carriages ==
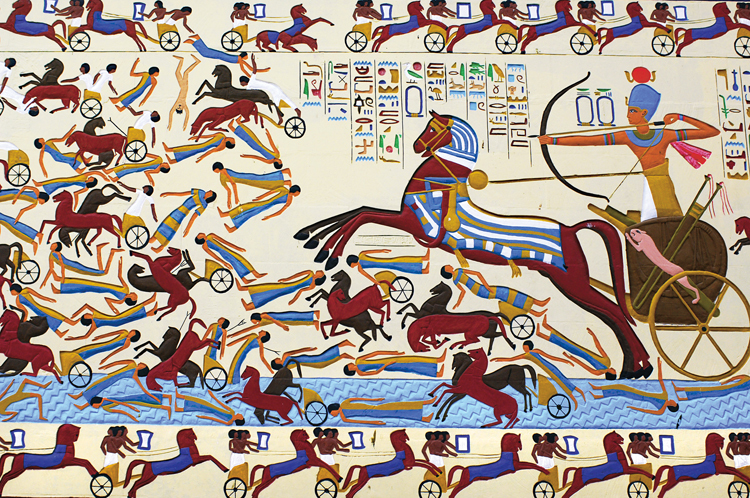
Horses with chariots used at siege of Dapur in 1269 BC.

While there is some anthropological evidence that horses were ridden before they were driven, the most unequivocal evidence of domestication and use of the horse as a driving animal are the Sintashta chariot burials in the southern Urals, circa 2000 BC. However, shortly thereafter, the expansion of the domestic horse throughout Europe was little short of explosive. In the span of possibly 500 years, there is evidence of horse-drawn chariots in Greece, Egypt, and Mesopotamia. By another 500 years, the horse-drawn chariot had spread to China.

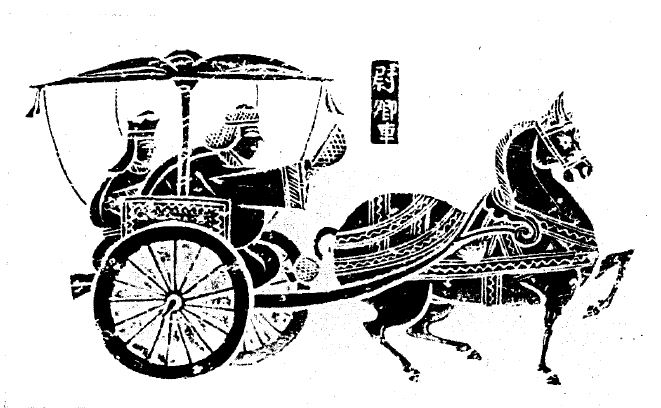
The breast-collar harness, used in China from the ancient to medieval era, c. 147 AD

The throat-girth design was not improved until the Chinese breast-strap or "breastcollar" harness developed during the Warring States (481–221 BC) era in China. The Chinese breast harness became known throughout Central Asia by the 7th century, and was introduced to Europe by the 8th century.

Its first depiction in artwork was on lacquer-ware boxes from the ancient State of Chu in the 4th century BC, showing the first known use of a yoke placed across a horse's chest, with traces connecting to the chariot shaft. This type of harness put pressure upon the sternum, where the line of traction is directly linked with the skeletal system of the horse, allowing for nearly full exertion. It was in universal use by the time of the Chinese Han dynasty (202 BC – 220 AD), depicted in artwork of hundreds of different carvings, stone reliefs, and stamped bricks showing it featured on horses pulling chariots. This type of breast-strap harness became known in Central Asia and elsewhere with the Avars, Magyars, Bohemians, Poles, and Russians during the 7th to 10th centuries. After Central Asia, the first breast-strap harness was spread to Europe by the 8th century (in depicted artwork), and became more widespread by the following 9th century (for example, depicted in a tapestry of the Oseberg ship burial).

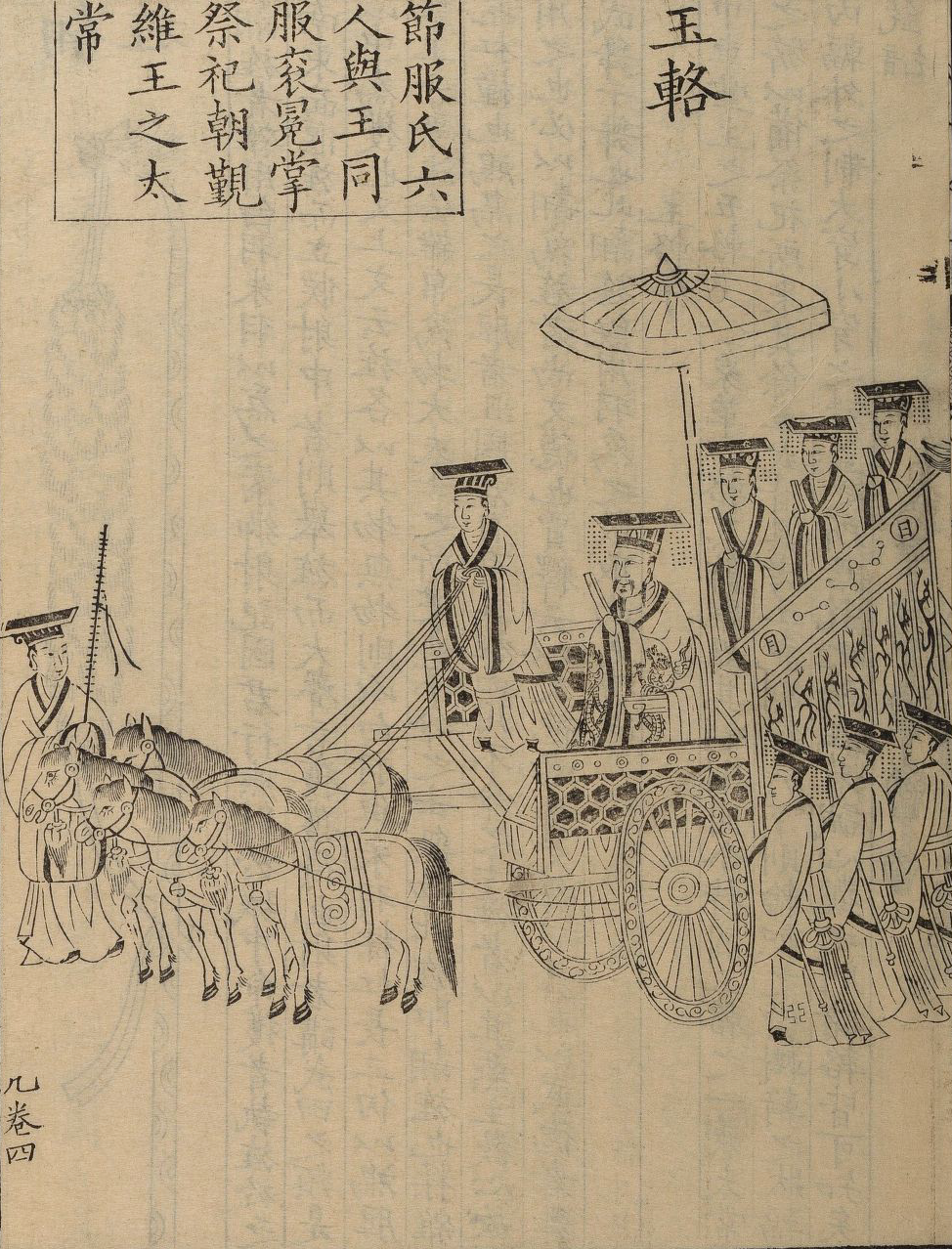
Yulu (玉輅), a chariot used by Chinese monarchs

Though the exact date of when the Chinese started to use carriages is largely unknown, early oracle bone inscriptions discovered in Henan province show that the carriage had already developed into many different forms. The earliest archaeological evidence of chariots in China, a chariot burial site discovered in 1933 at Hougang, Anyang in Henan province, dates to the late Shang dynasty (c. 1250 BCE). Oracle bone inscriptions suggest that the western enemies of the Shang used limited numbers of chariots in battle, but the Shang themselves used them only as mobile command-vehicles and in royal hunts.

The hard yoke across the horse's chest was gradually replaced by a breast strap, which was often depicted in carved reliefs and stamped bricks of tombs from the Han Dynasty (202 BC – 220 AD).

During the Shang dynasty, members of the royal family were buried with a complete household and servants, including a chariot, horses, and a charioteer. A Shang chariot was often drawn by two horses, but four-horse variants are occasionally found in burials.

Jacques Gernet claims that the Zhou dynasty, which conquered the Shang ca. 1046 BCE, made more use of the chariot than did the Shang and "invented a new kind of harness with four horses abreast". From the 8th to 5th centuries BCE the Chinese use of chariots reached its peak. Although chariots appeared in greater numbers, infantry often defeated charioteers in battle.

Massed-chariot warfare became all but obsolete after the Warring-States Period (476–221 BCE), though chariots would continue to serve as command posts for officers during the Qin dynasty (221–206 BCE) and the Han dynasty (206 BCE–220 CE).

== Medieval period ==
Even after the chariot had become obsolete as a tool of war, there still was a need for technological innovations in pulling technologies as larger horses were needed to pull heavier loads of both supplies and weapons. The invention of the horse collar in China during the 5th century (Northern and Southern dynasties) allowed horses to pull greater weight than they could when hitched to a vehicle by means of the ox yokes or breast collars used in earlier times.

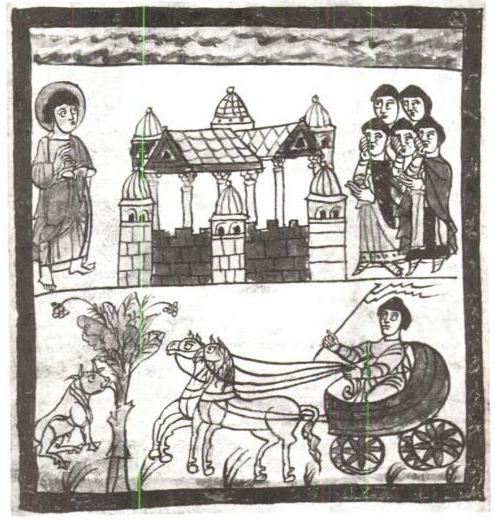
Earliest European depiction of a horse collar, c. 800 AD

The horse collar spread to Europe by the 9th century and became universal by the 12th century. The Scandinavians were among the first to use a collar design that did not constrain the breathing passages of the horses. When the horse was harnessed with a collar, it could apply roughly 50% more power to a task than an ox due to its greater speed. Horses also had greater endurance and could work more hours in a day. Europe's long familiarity with horses made the transition from oxen-based harnesses to the collar relatively smooth.

The collar removed the physical restrictions of earlier harnesses, allowing the horse to exert its full strength in ploughing and transport. Originally, older harnesses forced the horse to pull its workload; the collar allowed the horse to push into the load instead, greatly increasing efficiency.

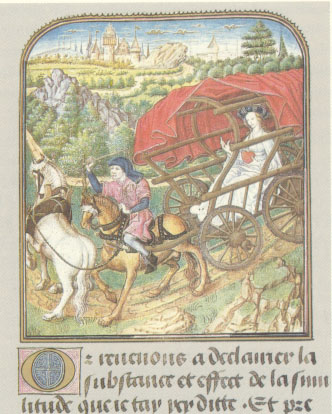
Horse-drawn wagon, c. 1455

The medieval carriage was a sort of covered wagon. Sharing the traditional form of wheels and undercarriage known since the Bronze Age, it very likely also employed the pivoting fore-axle in continuity from the ancient world. Suspension (on chains) is recorded in visual images and written accounts from the 14th century ("chars branlant" or rocking carriages), and was in widespread use by the 15th century. Carriages were largely used by royalty, aristocrats (and especially by women), and could be elaborately decorated and gilded. These carriages were usually on four wheels and were drawn by two to four horses depending on their size and status. Wood and iron were the primary materials needed to build a carriage, and carriages that were used by non-royalty were covered by plain leather.

In the early 14th century England, coaches were still extremely rare. It is unlikely there were more than a dozen, and even then they were very costly until the end of the century. These coaches had four six-spoke, six-foot high wheels that were linked by greased axles under the body of the coach and they had no suspension. The chassis was made from oak beams and the barrel shaped roof was covered in brightly painted leather or cloth. The interior included seats, beds, cushions, tapestries and even rugs. They were pulled by four to five horses.

== Early modern period ==
One of the great innovations in carriage history was the invention of the suspended carriage or the chariot branlant (though whether this was a Roman or medieval innovation remains uncertain). The "chariot branlant" of medieval illustrations was suspended by chains rather than leather straps as had been believed. Suspension, whether on chains or leather, might provide a smoother ride since the carriage body no longer rested on the axles, but could not prevent swinging (branlant) in all directions. It is clear from illustrations (and surviving examples) that the medieval suspended carriage with a round tilt was a widespread European type, referred to by any number of names (car, currus, char, chariot).

Under King Mathias Corvinus (1458–90), who enjoyed fast travel, the Hungarians developed fast road transport, and the town of Kocs between Budapest and Vienna became an important post-town, and gave its name to the new vehicle type. The earliest illustrations of the Hungarian "Kochi-wagon" do not indicate any suspension, a body with high sides of lightweight wickerwork, and typically drawn by three horses in harness. Later models were considerably lighter and famous for a single horse being able to draw many passengers.

The Hungarian coach spread across Europe, initially rather slowly, in part due to Ippolito d'Este of Ferrara (1479–1520), nephew of Mathias' queen Beatrix of Aragon, who as a very junior Archbishopric of Esztergom developed a taste for Hungarian riding and took his carriage and driver back to Italy. Then rather suddenly, in around 1550, the "coach" made its appearance throughout the major cities of Europe, and the new word entered the vocabulary of all their languages. However, the new "coach" seems to have been a fashionable concept (fast road travel for men) as much as any particular type of vehicle, and there is no obvious technological change that accompanied the innovation, either in the use of suspension (which came earlier), or the adoption of springs (which came later). As its use spread throughout Europe in the late 16th century, the coach's body structure was ultimately changed, from a round-topped tilt to the "four-poster" carriages that became standard everywhere by c.1600.

Coaches had doors in the side, with an iron step protected by leather that became the "boot" in which servants might ride. The driver sat on a seat at the front, and the most important occupant sat in the back facing forwards. The earliest coaches can be seen at Veste Coburg, Lisbon, and the Moscow Kremlin, and they become a commonplace in European art. It was not until the 17th century that further innovations with steel springs and glazing took place, and only in the 18th century, with better road surfaces, was there a major innovation with the introduction of the steel C-spring.

One source says that in, "1564, Boonen, a Dutchman, became the Queen's coachman, and was the first that brought the use of coaches into England." Another source says it was not until 1580, in the reign of Queen Elizabeth I, that coaches were introduced to England from France by Henry FitzAlan, 19th Earl of Arundel. These were designed to be pulled by a pair of horses. In 1619 George Villiers, 1st Duke of Buckingham introduced the coach drawn by six horses.

In 1772, Robert Norris described the use of two coaches in Dahomey during a ceremonial procession. They were drawn by 12 men instead of horses probably as a result of the small number of horses in Dahomey.

== Late modern period ==
=== 18th-century suspension and coach design ===
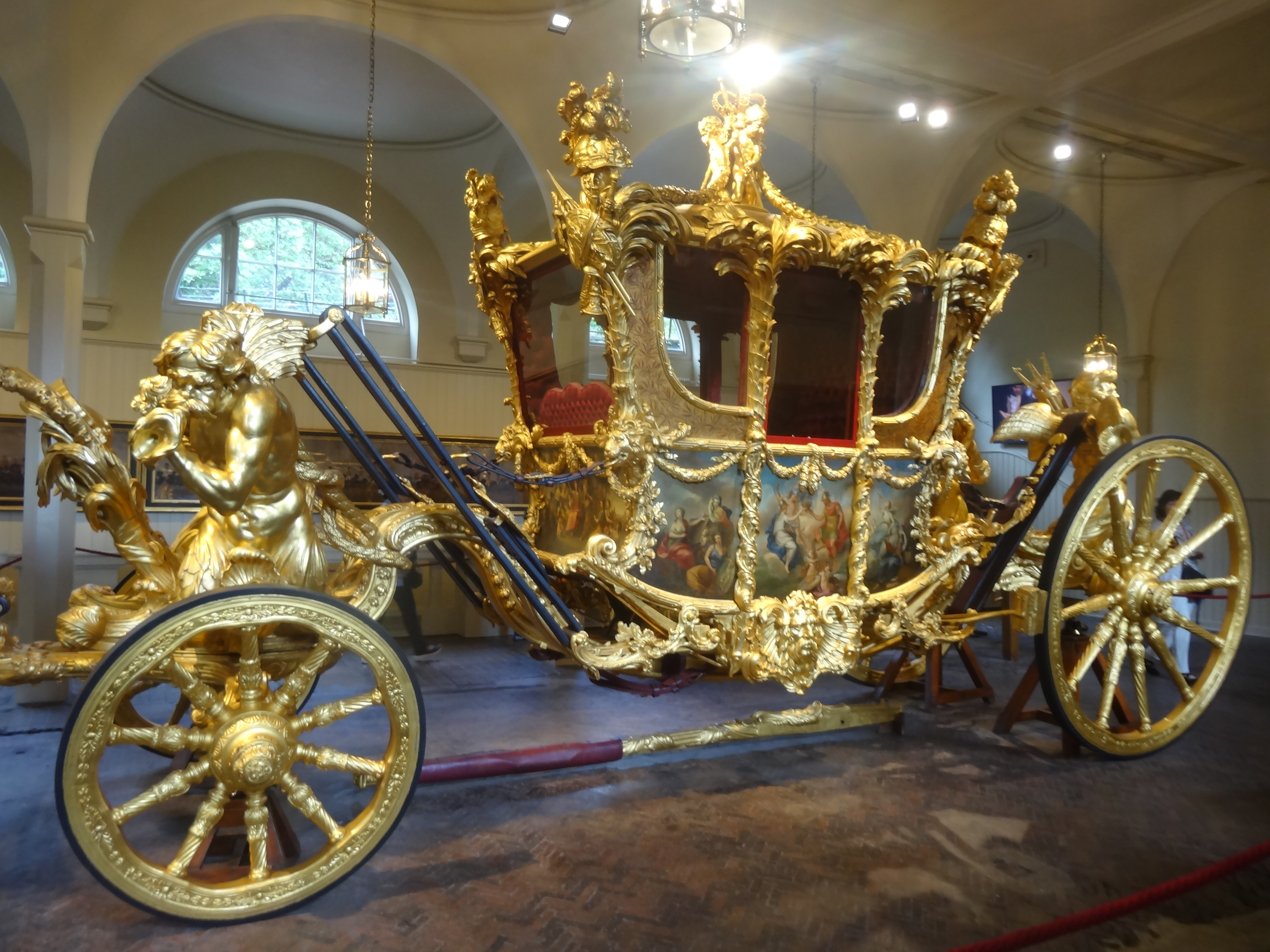
This image of a 1760s coach shows the long leather straps which supported early coaches.

In the eighteenth century, many coaches were still suspended on long leather straps known as thoroughbraces. Steel springs were also introduced during this period, offering a more comfortable ride. An advertisement in the Edinburgh Courant for 1754 reads, "The Edinburgh stage-coach, for the better accommodation of passengers, will be altered to a new genteel two-end glass coach-machine, hung on steel springs, exceedingly light and easy..."

Thoroughbraces were gradually replaced by various configurations of steel springs as these were invented, but they did not disappear entirely. The 19th-century American Concord coach famously retained leather strap suspension for its durability on rough terrain.

=== 19th-century technological innovations ===
Many innovations were proposed, and some patented, for new types of suspension and steering. In the late 18th century, the English physician Erasmus Darwin identified two major shortcomings in contemporary light carriages: the jarring ride caused by small front wheels on a pivoting axle, and the danger of overturning when the axle turned too sharply.

In 1879 the Paris coachbuilder Felber exhibited a coupé with an electric order-transmitter, a telegraph-style dial and bell letting the passenger signal instructions to the coachman, and a Victoria with an electrically actuated odometer registering hectometres and kilometres via wheel-triggered contacts. An 1881 account of its workshops also described a concealed folding seat (strapontin invisible) and a landau with rigid fabric-lined panels in place of the traditional folding leather top.

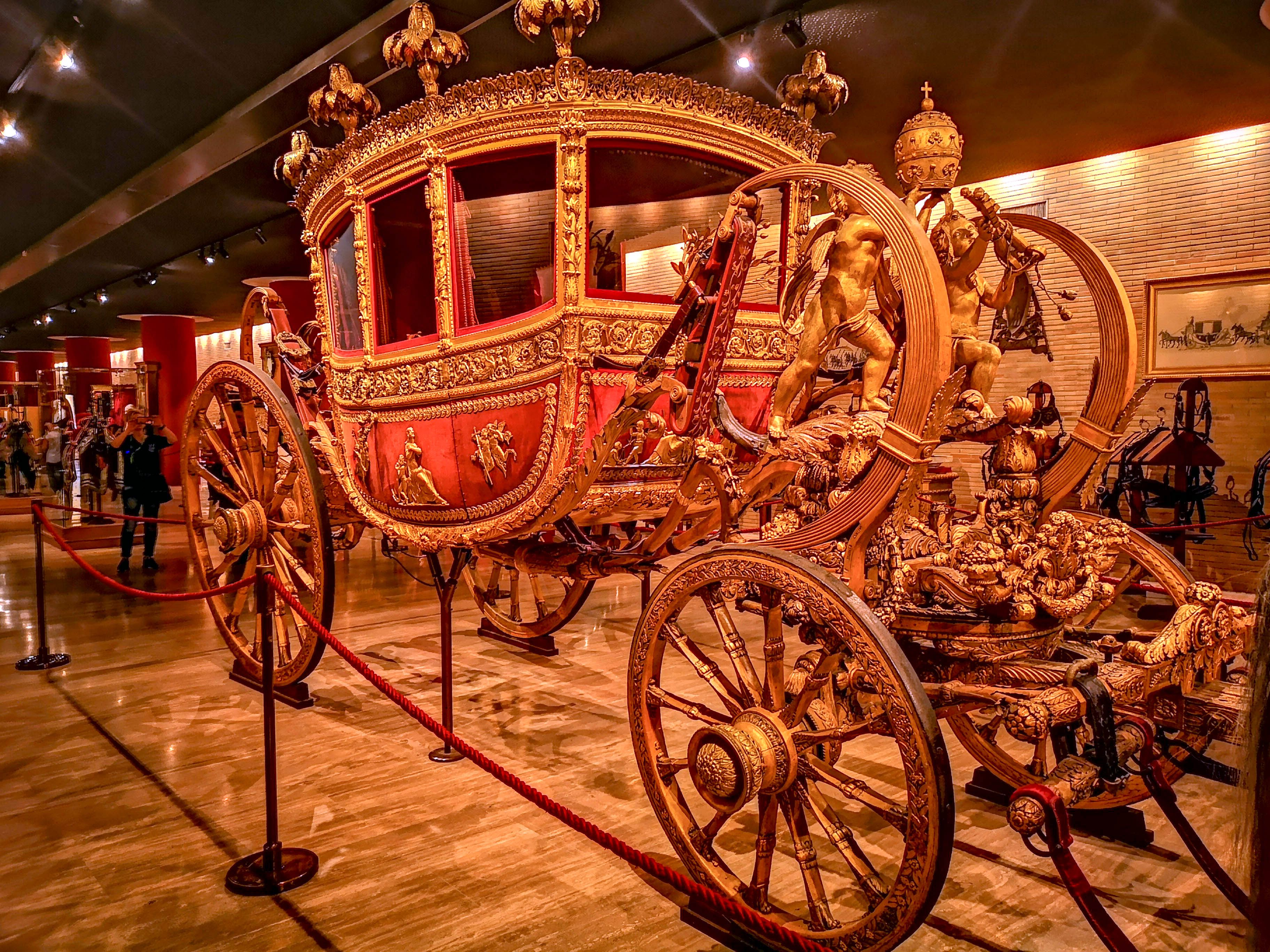
The Grand Gala Berlin constructed 1824–1826 for Leo XII

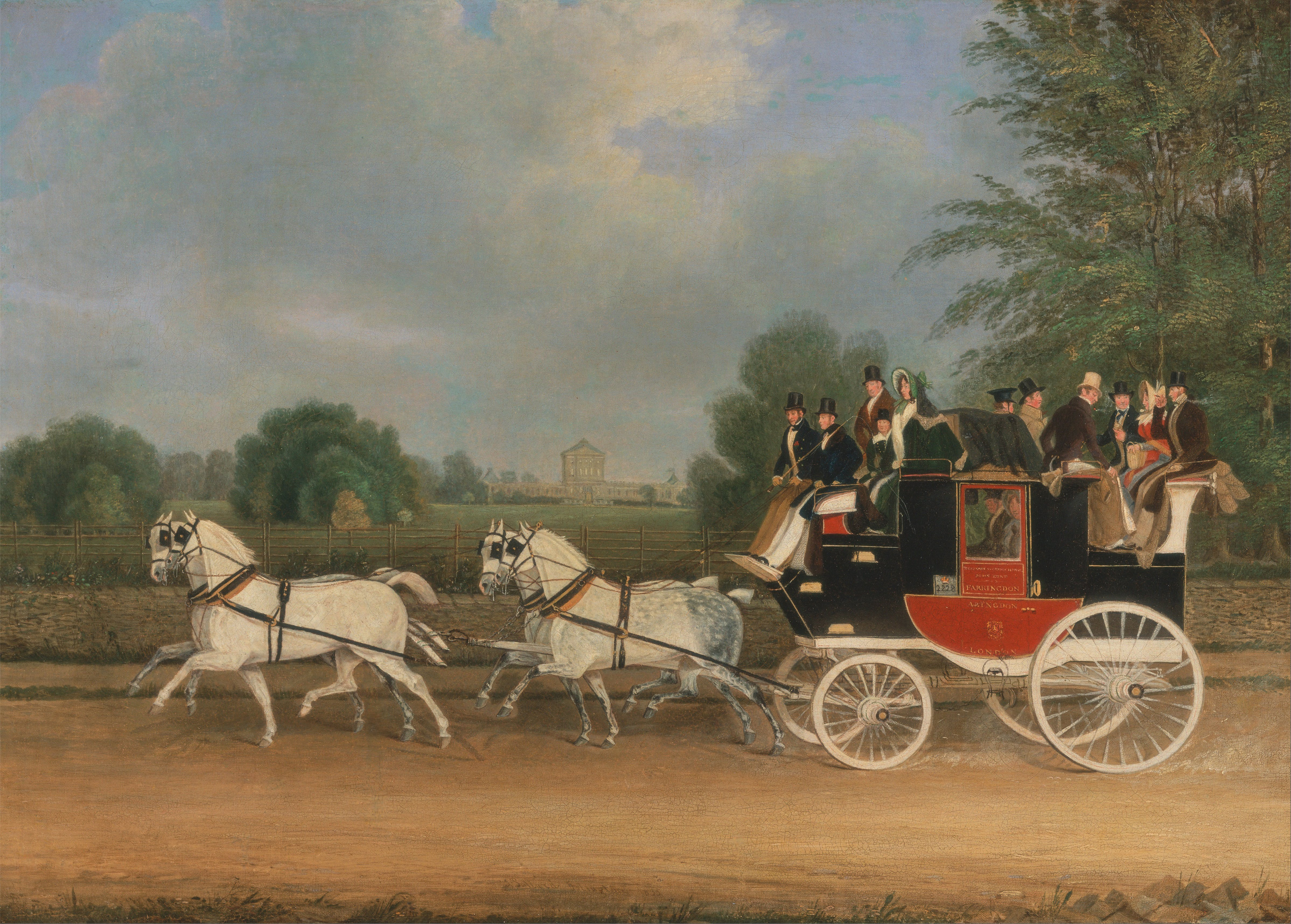
The London-Farringdon coach, 1835

== Carriage use in North America ==
The development and use of carriages in North America followed a different trajectory from Europe, shaped by colonial settlement patterns, road conditions, and regional economies. Carriage use in North America came with the establishment of European settlers. Early colonial horse tracks quickly grew into roads especially as the colonists extended their territories southwest. Colonists began using carts as these roads and trading increased between the north and south. Eventually, carriages or coaches were sought to transport goods as well as people. As in Europe, chariots, coaches and carriages were a mark of status. The tobacco planters of the South were some of the first Americans to use the carriage as a form of human transportation. As the tobacco farming industry grew in the southern colonies so did the frequency of carriages, coaches and wagons. Upon the turn of the 18th century, wheeled vehicle use in the colonies was at an all-time high. Carriages, coaches and wagons were being taxed based on the number of wheels they had. These taxes were implemented in the South primarily as the South had superior numbers of horses and wheeled vehicles when compared to the North. Europe, however, still used carriage transportation far more often and on a much larger scale than anywhere else in the world.

== Decline of the horse-drawn era ==
With the invention of the automobile, the tractor and other internal combustion vehicles, the need for driving horses diminished, beginning with the end of World War I and to an even greater degree after World War II. However, interest in driving competition for horses continued, with the horse show and harness racing worlds keeping interest alive, and the development of the sport of combined driving continued to refine the art of proper training and driving techniques. In addition, many third world nations retain a need for driving horses for basic farm work and transportation.

Carriages and coaches began to disappear as use of steam propulsion began to generate more and more interest and research. Steam power quickly won the battle against animal power as is evident by a newspaper article written in England in 1895 entitled "Horseflesh vs. Steam". The article highlights the death of the carriage as the main means of transportation.

In the 19th century the word "coach" was used for U.S. railway carriages, and in the 20th century to motor coaches.

== Contemporary use ==
There are many sport and recreation activities which involve horse driving and preserve skills associated with traditional horse-drawn transport, including carriage driving, combined driving, pleasure driving, and draft horse competitions. Across many regions, working horses are used for tasks where motor vehicles are impractical, such as forestry in sensitive ecosystems, and small-scale farming.

Although motor vehicles have largely replaced equine transport in most industrialized countries, horse-drawn vehicles continue to serve practical, cultural, and economic roles in many parts of the world. According to the Food and Agriculture Organization in 2011:

Whilst there has been a focus on increased use of mechanical power for the past 50 years, the majority of rural households and smallholder farmers engaged in agriculture in developing countries do not have access to mechanised transport and heavily rely on animals or hand power for carrying out farming activities. Animal traction has in fact expanded in Africa and remains widespread in Asia and Latin America.

In North America, carriages remain a primary mode of daily transportation among some Amish communities. Horse-drawn carriages are used for tourism in many cities, such as New York, Charleston, and New Orleans, and for primary transportation on Mackinac Island. In rural areas of the western US and Canada, draft horses are still used for logging, small scale farming, and ranch work where low-impact methods are preferred.

In Europe, ceremonial and heritage uses are prominent. The Royal Mews in London maintains a working collection of state coaches and carriages for royal and diplomatic events, and similar traditions continue in Spain, Denmark, Sweden, and the Netherlands. Horse-drawn vehicles are used for tourism in cities such as Vienna, Kraków, Paris, and Rome. In some rural regions, including parts of Romania, Bulgaria, Poland, and Ireland, horse-drawn carts remain in everyday use for agricultural tasks and short-distance transport, and horse traction for agriculture and forestry has been expanding.

In Asia, horse-drawn vehicles persist both as cultural icons and as practical transport. Variants such as the Tonga (India and Pakistan), delman or andong (Indonesia), kalesa (Philippines), and tanga (Nepal) continue to operate in urban and rural settings, often serving short-haul passengers or tourists. In western China and Mongolia, horses and horse-drawn sledges or carts are still used seasonally by pastoral communities.

In Africa, horse-drawn carts are common in regions where roads are unsuitable for motor vehicles or fuel is expensive. They are widely used for local freight, water delivery, and passenger transport in countries such as Senegal, Mali, Ethiopia, and parts of South Africa. Donkey-drawn carts are even more widespread. In urban settings such as in Cape Town, horse and donkey carts operate on the lower tiers of the economy, taking on tasks like waste hauling, scrap collection, and other marginal services.

In Latin America, traditional horse-drawn vehicles survive in both rural and urban contexts. In Cuba, horse-drawn "coche" taxis operate in many towns; in parts of Colombia and Mexico, equine carts are used for waste collection, agriculture, and local transport, though some municipalities have phased them out. Uruguay and Argentina maintain strong equestrian traditions, and horse-drawn carriages appear in festivals, parades, and tourism.

In Oceania, horse-drawn transport is mostly limited to tourism, ceremonial events, and agricultural demonstrations, though some remote Australian communities still use horses for station work and low-impact land management.

== See also ==
- History of road transport
- Horse-drawn vehicle
