= Ekka (disambiguation) =

Ekka is the annual show of Queensland, Australia. Ekka or EKKA may also refer to

- Ekka (surname)
- National and Social Liberation (Greek: Εθνική και Κοινωνική Απελευθέρωσις, Ethniki kai Koinoniki Apeleftherosis, also known by its initials EKKA), a Greek resistance group during World War II
- Ekka (carriage), a one-horse carriage used in India.
- EKKA, the ICAO-code for Midtjyllands Airport.
- National and Social Liberation (Ethniki Kai Koinoniki Apeleftherosis or EKKA), the Greek Resistance movement founded by Colonel Dimitrios Psarros.
- Ekka Raja Rani, a 1994 Bollywood comedy drama film
- Ekka Saka, a 2015 Indian Tulu-language film
- Ekka (film), a 2025 Indian Kannada-language film
