= Futala Lake =

Indian lake

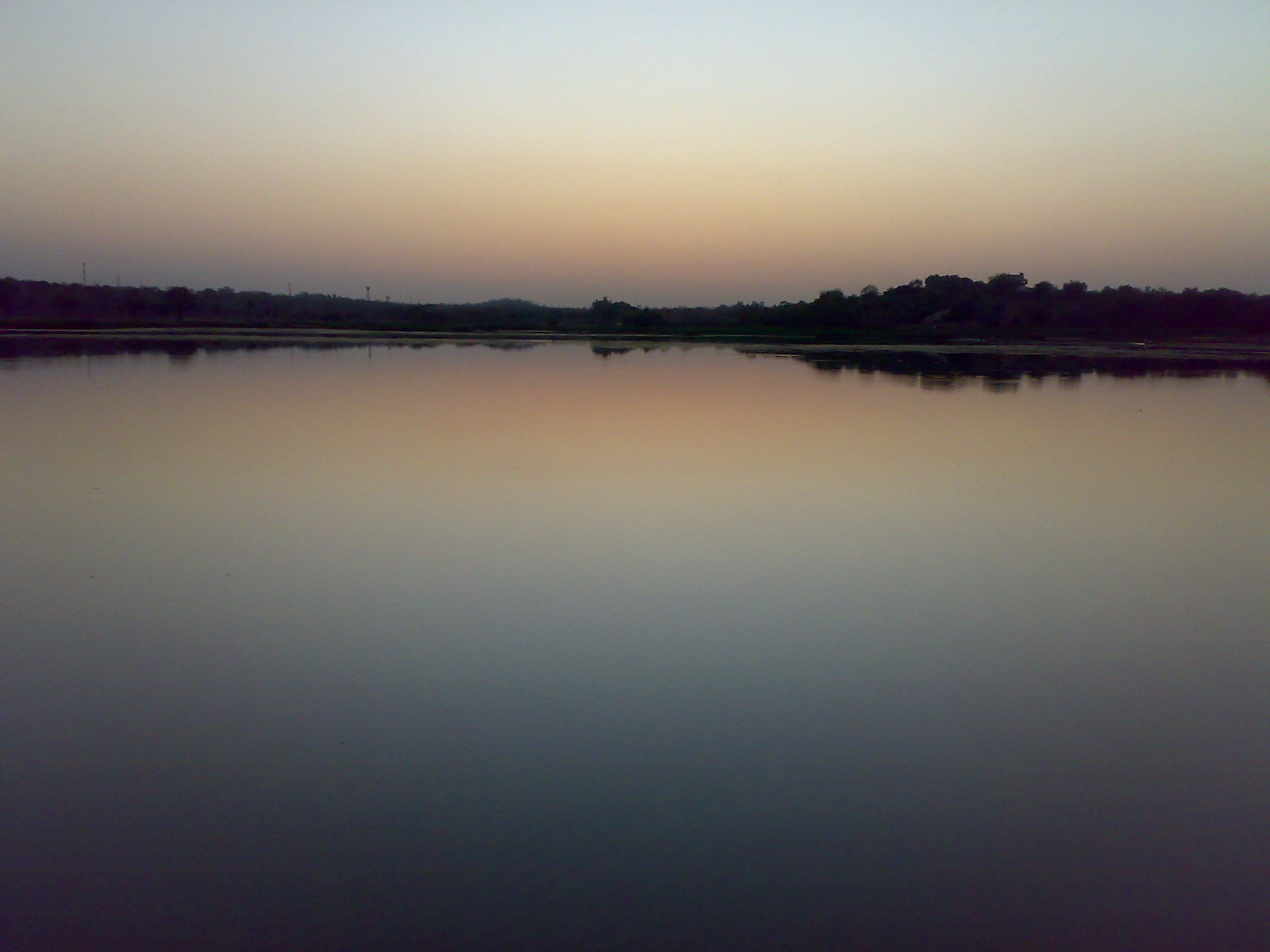
- Futala Lake Nagpur

- Location within Maharashtra
- Location: Maharashtra, India
- Coordinates: 21.154°N 79.042°E
- Surface area: 60 acres (24 ha)

Futala Lake is a lake in Nagpur in the Indian state of Maharashtra. The lake covers 60 acres (24 ha). Built by the Bhosle kings of Nagpur, the lake is known for its coloured fountains. In the evenings the site is illuminated with halogen lights and Tanga (carriage) rides. The lake is surrounded on three sides by forest and a landscaped beach on the fourth side.

== Beautification of Futala Lake ==
In the western area of Nagpur, ancient Futala Lake has existed for 200 years. In the absence of maintenance, the use of this prehistoric lake was limited to cattle washing only. It was therefore decided in 2003 to beautify this lake from NIT funds with equal aid from the state government.

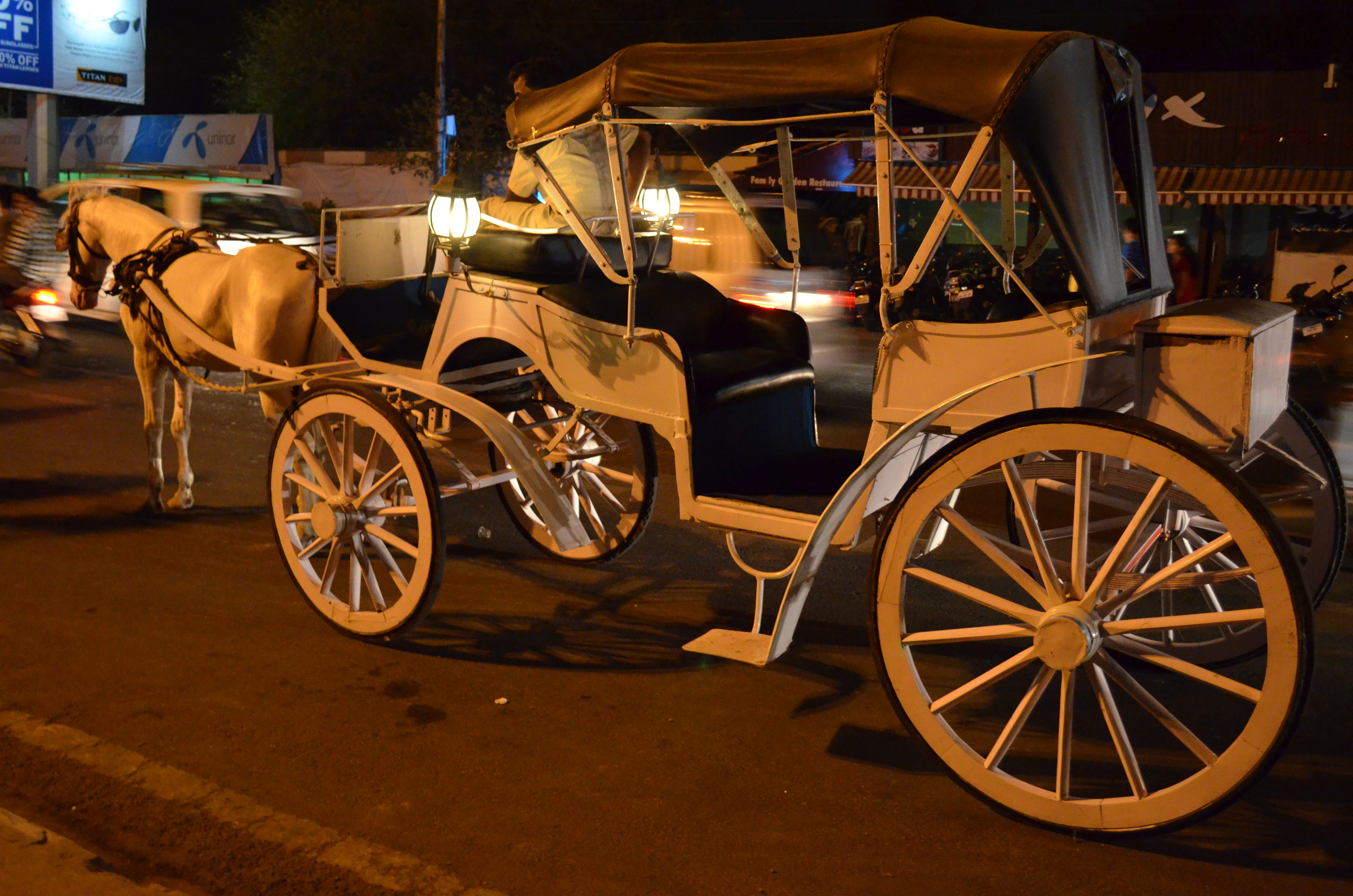
Tanga (carriage) at Futala Lake

The work was done in two stages. Desilting was done on large scale along with the removal of lotus plants and other waste from the lake. The work included repairing the eastern guard wall of the lake, construction of a pathway with granite stone paving, widening of an 18 m wide road under I.R.D.P., roadside guard wall and landscaping berms, parking and garden bays on the other side of the road, and fixing decorative lamp, benches, attractive dust bins, etc. For watering of plants and landscaping, a sprinkler system was provided. For sufficient lighting with four high masts were fixed in the vicinity of the lake. Two coloured 15 feet (4.6 m) fountains and a white 100 feet fountain were set up in the lake. The work of Immersion Ghat with three ramps on the south side and guard wall of the lake with sand beach on the north side was also done in the first phase.

In the second phase of beautification, road berms were cleaned and interlocking paving blocks were fixed on the road from Hanuman Temple to Futala Lake and surrounding triangular land in front of the Temple. About 1300m road was paved under this to solve the grave parking problem raised due to the famous Hanuman temple and beautification done.

The area has become the most attractive spot in Nagpur City and, on average, 1,000 visitors visit the lake daily. Much work is still to be done including the construction of the hill steps, sand beach paving on the platform, Nana-Nani park, etc. on the south side of the lake. Also, a water pond and garden are to be developed on a triangular plot opposite Hanuman Temple.

The cost of the project is about 45,000,000.

In 2010, NIT negotiated an agreement with Sell Ads (Partners Shailendra Mehta and Pankaj Roy) for beautification and maintenance of the Futala Lake areas and erection of mobile food kiosks for a period of 5 years on a BOT basis.

== Aquatic life ==
Excessive nutrient load (C, N and P) in Futala lake has caused heavy growth of water hyacinth, water lily, hydrilla, wolffia, potamogeton and algae.

== Musical Fountain ==
In 2019, a large-scale redevelopment plan was launched to build a floating musical fountain on Futala Lake. The design includes long steel barges anchored in the lake, high-pressure water jets, synchronized laser and LED lighting, and a 180-degree viewing gallery on the shoreline. The multimedia show is planned to combine water choreography, music, and projection effects.

== Current Status ==
In January 2024, the Supreme Court ordered a status quo on further construction and use of the floating musical fountain facility after environmental petitions raised concerns related to wetland regulations and lakeshore protection guidelines. Trial shows had previously been conducted for officials and invited guests, but public access remained suspended following the order.

In October 2025, the Supreme Court clarified that Futala Lake is a man-made waterbody and not a notified wetland, allowing temporary structures such as the floating fountain and viewing gallery to resume operations, subject to compliance with environmental and safety conditions.

Work on restoring the Futala musical fountain continued through 2026. By August 2026, the repair and equipment replacement is still underway and regular public shows have not yet resumed.

== Other lakes in Nagpur ==
Nagpur has ten other big lakes:

- Ambazari
- Gandhisagar
- Naik
- Lendi
- Sonegaon
- Pardi
- Khadan
- Gorewada
- Sakkardara
- Dhobi talav
