= Ekka (surname) =

Ekka is an Indian surname. Notable people with the surname include:

- Albert Ekka (1942–1971), Indian soldier
- Alice Ekka (1917–1978), Indian Adivasi writer
- Anosh Ekka, Indian politician
- Christopher Ekka (born 1943), Indian politician
- Deep Grace Ekka (born 1994), Indian field hockey player
