= Georges Raepsaet =

Belgian classical archaeologist

- Born: 3 August 1947 (age 79); Oudenaarde, Belgium
- Education: Université libre de Bruxelles
- Scientific career
- Fields: Classical archaeologist, historian of antiquity
- Workplaces: Université libre de Bruxelles

Georges Raepsaet (born 3 August 1947) is a Belgian classical archaeologist and historian of antiquity. His main research interests are the archaeology of ancient technologies, especially traction systems in Greco-Roman land transport and farming, the production and trade of ancient ceramics and the wider socioeconomic implications of these technologies, as well as Roman Gaul. His methods include the use of experimentation.

== Career ==
Born in 1947 in the Eastern Flemish town of Oudenaarde, Belgium, Raepsaet received his Master in Ancient History in 1969, and another one in Arts and Archaeology in 1972, both at the University of Brussels. In 1977 he completed his dissertation on the Pagus Condrustis and the Romanization of Northern Gaul. In the following year, Raepsaet became senior lecturer at the Université libre de Bruxelles where he was appointed professor in 1992 and taught until his retirement in 2007. His courses focused, inter alia, on classical archaeology, ancient economic and social history, history of pre-industrial technologies, archaeology of Roman Gaul and excavation techniques. He founded and directed the university research units Laboratoire d’Archéologie classique and Centre de Recherches archéologiques.

From 1997 to 1999 Raepsaet co-directed a research programme on the process of technological innovation in antiquity and the Middle Ages. Currently, he works as an expert for the European Science Foundation and chairs the scientific committee of the Royal Museum of Mariemont. Since 1970 Raepsaet has been on the editorial board of the Belgian journal L’Antiquité Classique for which he has been reviewing each year about thirty books on classic archaeology, economic history and ancient technology.

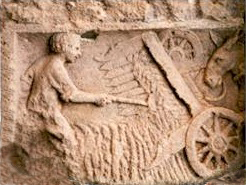
Gallo-Roman reaper, called vallus

Since 1970 Raepsaet has participated in and directed several archaeological excavations and fieldworks in Western Europe and the eastern Mediterranean basin. These include underwater excavations at Martigues, France, and Amathus on Cyprus, as well as fieldwork at the site of the Diolkos on the Isthmus and Styra on Euboea (1984–88). He also took part in excavations in Apamea, Syria (1978–79) and in numerous archaeological projects on the Roman period in his native Belgium (since 1968). At Brussels he was in charge of temporary exhibitions of Ancient Greek marbles (Marbres helléniques, 1987–88) and of Thracian gold (Europalia Bulgarie, 2002).

From 1997 to 2007 Raepsaet conducted a number of tests in experimental archaeology on ancient agricultural techniques, in particular on the efficiency of Gallo-Roman harnesses, drawbars and the reaper (vallus). Over the years Raepsaet has also been active in the study of the technology and trade of Roman ceramics, its distribution and transport network in the Roman provinces and commercial and legal aspects related to it.

== Ancient technology and productivity ==
Much of Raepsaet's research since the 1970s has addressed and challenged the idea, still dominant at the time, of a lack of productivity of the Roman economy. Raepsaet criticized the "epistemological prejudice" particularly prevalent in studies of the 1960s and 1970s: these analyzed the classical world in terms of stagnation and technological blockage, effectively preventing scholarship from approaching the sizable corpus of evidence to the contrary from an unbiased perspective.

Raepsaet focused on the key role of traction systems in land transport and ploughing, a field then dominated by strong primitivist views. He demonstrated that ancient transport capacities were in fact largely identical to and as developed and efficient as those of later periods up until the 19th century, but with the Romans enjoying the additional advantage of having a superior road network at their disposal. Through his study of Gallo-Roman harnesses, Raepsaet came to reject the early, but influential theory of Richard Lefebvre des Noëttes about the inefficiency of the Roman horse collar. In reality, draught animals in antiquity were able to move heavy loads of several dozens tons overland evident, for example, in the frequent transport of ancient monoliths or the regular use of the Diolkos ship trackway.

Raepsaet′s reappraisal of the technological level of ancient traction systems has been echoed and parallelled by a generation of classical scholars and historians of technology pursuing studies in diverse fields of ancient technology. From their collaborative effort to move beyond a sterile dichotomy of primitivism and modernism sprang, for example, Brill′s series on Technology and Change in History and the Handbook of Engineering and Technology in the Classical World which received the 2009 book award of the Society for the History of Technology. The increasingly positive perception of ancient technological developments and their economic impact has also contributed to a reevaluation of the performance of the ancient economy as a whole.

== Selected works ==
Ceramics and archaeology of the Roman provinces

- La céramique en terre sigillée de la villa belgo-romaine de Robelmont. Campagnes 1968–1971, Brussels: Editions de l’Université, 1974, ISBN 2-8004-0412-4
- Gallia Belgica et Germania inferior. Vingt-cinq années de recherches historiques et archéologiques, in Temporini, H. (ed.), Aufstieg und Niedergang der römischen Welt, II.4, Berlin and New York: W. de Gruyter, 1975, pp. 3–299 (co-author), ISBN 3-11-004570-2

Economic history, land transport and agricultural technology

- Attelages et techniques de transport dans le monde gréco-romain, Brussels: Livre Timperman, 2002, ISBN 90-71868-62-1
- Brancards et transport attelé entre Seine et Rhin de l’Antiquité au Moyen âge, Treignes: Ecomusée, 1995 (co-editor and co-author)
- Le sol et l’araire dans l’Antiquité, Actes du Colloque de Jemelle 26 April 1997, Brussels: Université libre de Bruxelles, 1998 (co-editor and co-author)
- La moissonneuse gallo-romaine, Actes de la Journée d’études de Bruxelles 24 April 1999, Brussels: Université libre de Bruxelles, 2000 (co-editor and co-author)
- Landtransport, Part 2: Riding, Harnesses, and Vehicles, in Oleson, John Peter (ed.), Handbook of Engineering and Technology in the Classical World, Oxford: Oxford University Press, 2008, pp. 580–605, ISBN 978-0-19-518731-1
- "Esel", "Landtransport", "Maultier", "Pferd", "Rind", in Der Neue Pauly, Stuttgart: Metzler, 1997–

Greco-Roman history and archaeology

- Rayonnement grec. Hommages à Charles Delvoye, Brussels: Editions de l’Université, 1982 (co-editor and co-author), ISBN 2-8004-0776-X
- L’or des Thraces. Trésors de Bulgarie. Catalogue de l’exposition Europalia, Brussels, 2002 (editor and co-author), ISBN 90-5349-401-4

== See also ==
- Greek technology
- Roman technology
