= The Three Musketeers (short story) =

1887 short story by Rudyard Kipling

"The Three Musketeers" is a short story by Rudyard Kipling which introduces three fictional British soldiers serving in India in the later nineteenth century: the privates Learoyd, Mulvaney and Ortheris. These characters appear in many early Kipling stories. "The Three Musketeers" was first published in the Civil and Military Gazette on 11 March 1887. It appeared in book form in Plain Tales from the Hills (1888).

Narrated by the three privates—mostly Mulvaney, the loquacious Irishman, and Ortheris —The Three Musketeers tells the story of how the three contrive not only to 'protest' (like the junior officers) against a proposed special parade requested by a visiting grandee, Lord Benira Trigg, but to have it cancelled and humiliate the Lord and receive a five-pound note apiece from him, for being "a honour to the British Harmy".

Trigg is a distinguished tourist, a peer on a 'fact-finding mission' (as we might now say) to write a book. "His particular vice—because he was a Radical, men said - was having garrisons turned out for his inspection ... He turned out troops once too often"—he asked for an inspection "On - a - Thursday" (the horror is that Thursday is understood to be the troops 'make and mend' day, or half-day holiday). Learoyd raises a subscription from the troops to have it cancelled, which is spent on suborning an ekka driver to take Trigg to Padsahi jhil, a large swampy tract of flooded land, about two miles off. They improve the operation by paying Buldoo, a "knowin' little divil" attached to the Artillery, to take the place of the ekka driver, and to mount a simulated abduction. Once the ekka is capsized into the jhil and Buldoo's three accomplices are banging sticks all over it, Learoyd, Mulvaney and Ortheris 'rescue' the Lord from "about forty" dacoits". He has to recover the next day in hospital, so the parade is cancelled. Trigg is grateful to The Three Musketeers (to the tune of three fivers), and the Colonel of the regiment is suspicious: but Mulvaney believes he would not have charged them with it had he known, as the cancellation of the Parade is welcome to all members of the regiment.
