= Horse collar =

Part of a horse harness

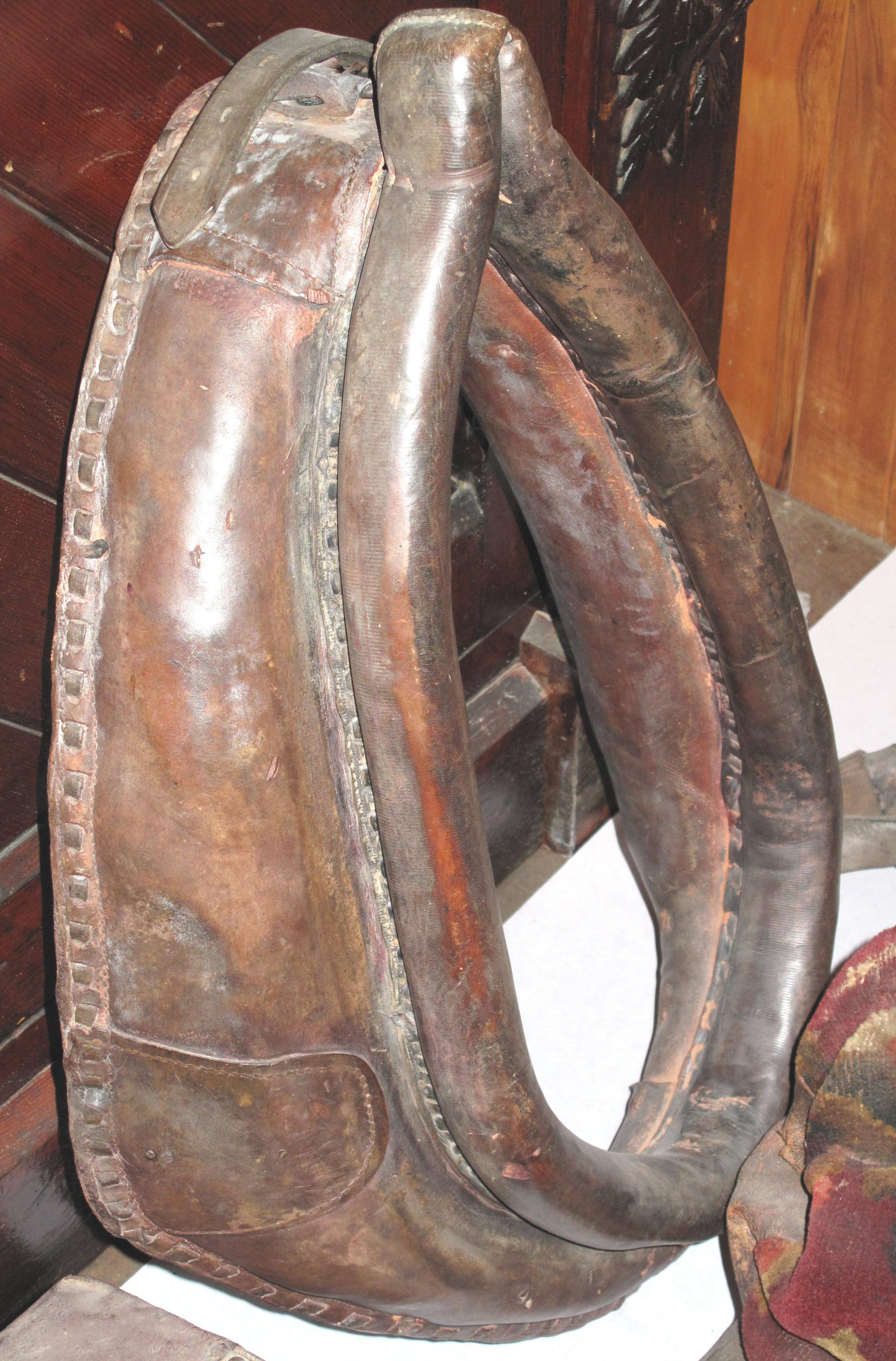
A leather horse collar without hames attached

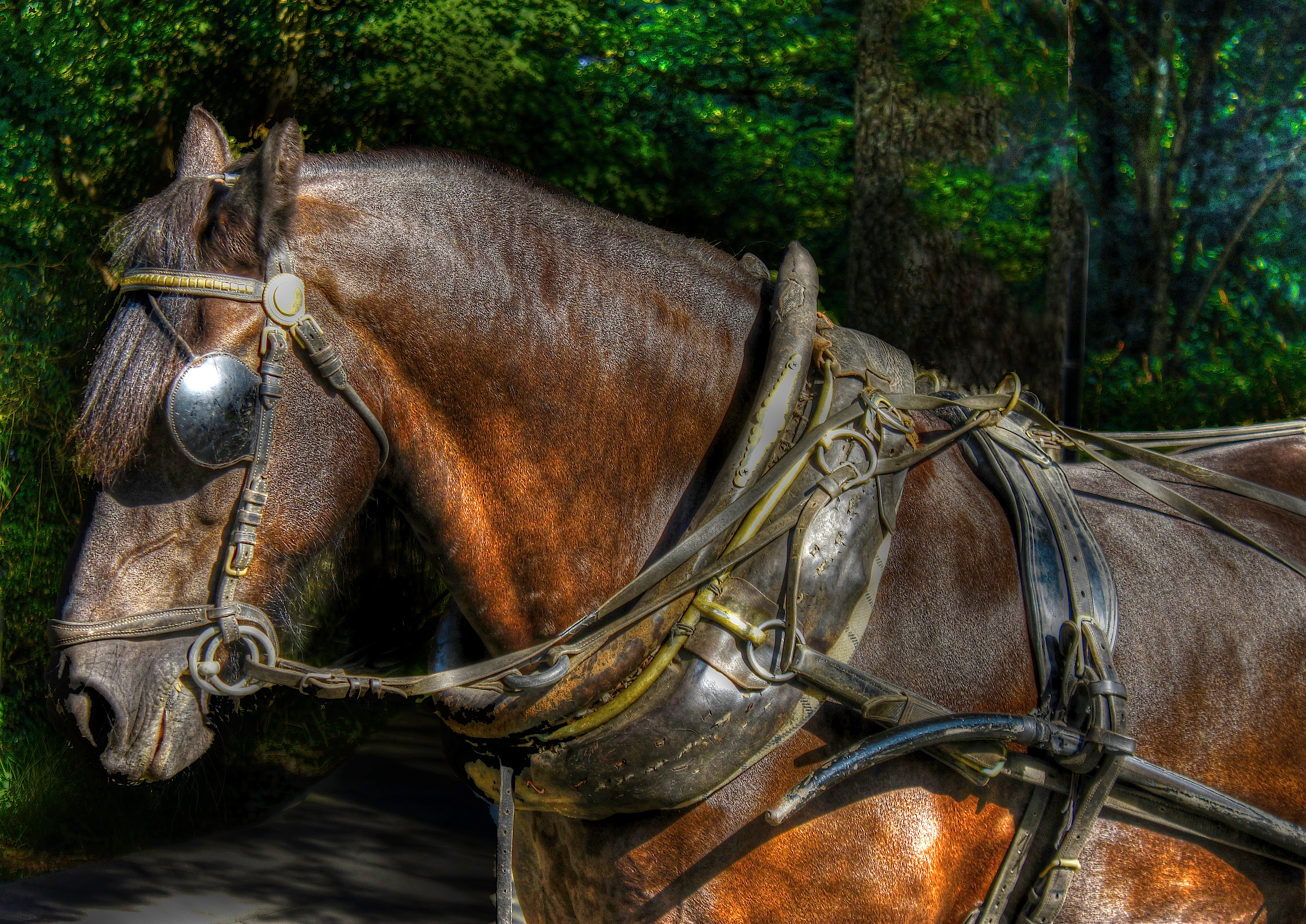
A typical draft collar and hames

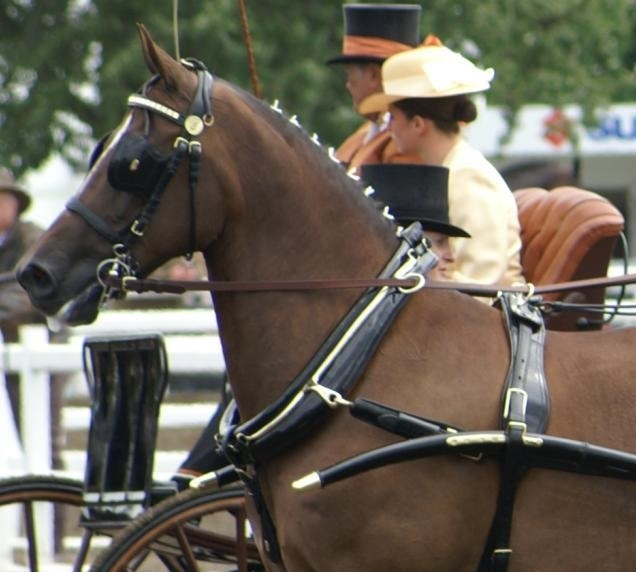
Collar with brass-plated hames on a carriage horse show harness

A horse collar is a component of horse harness designed to distribute the force of a load evenly across a horse's shoulders and chest, enabling efficient pulling of a load while not interfering with a horse's windpipe. Unlike earlier harness systems such as the throat-and-girth arrangement that restricted breathing and limited pulling power, the horse collar revolutionized draft work by allowing horses to exert their full strength without choking. This innovation dramatically increased agricultural productivity and transformed transportation, particularly in medieval Europe.

The collar typically encircles the lower neck in an oval shape and is padded to conform to the horse's anatomy. It supports a pair of rigid curved bars known as hames, which serve as anchor points for the traces—the straps or chains that connect the horse to the vehicle or load being pulled. By shifting the load-bearing surface to the shoulders, the horse collar enabled horses to outperform yoked oxen, making them indispensable in farming, freight, and urban development.

The widespread adoption of the horse collar around the 10th–12th centuries marked a turning point in rural economies. Horses could plough fields faster, haul heavier loads, and work longer hours, leading to surplus production, population growth, and the rise of market towns. This seemingly simple piece of tack played a pivotal role in the agricultural revolution and remains a cornerstone of draft harness systems today.

== Design ==
Video showing how horse collars were traditionally made (in German)

Horse collars are typically constructed from leather or synthetic materials and padded with straw, foam, horsehair, or other fibers. The collar's oval shape is designed to encircle the horse's neck, maximizing contact with the shoulders and chest, while avoiding pressure on the windpipe. This anatomical alignment allows the horse to push forward with its hindquarters, engaging its full body strength.

The primary types of collars are full collars, breast collars, and hybrid collars.

- Full collars, also called traditional collars, are best suited for heavy loads. They distribute weight broadly across the shoulder blades.
- Breast collars are designed as a wide strap that crosses the chest. Breast collars are used for lighter loads and faster hitching. If improperly fitted, they can press on the windpipe and restrict breathing.
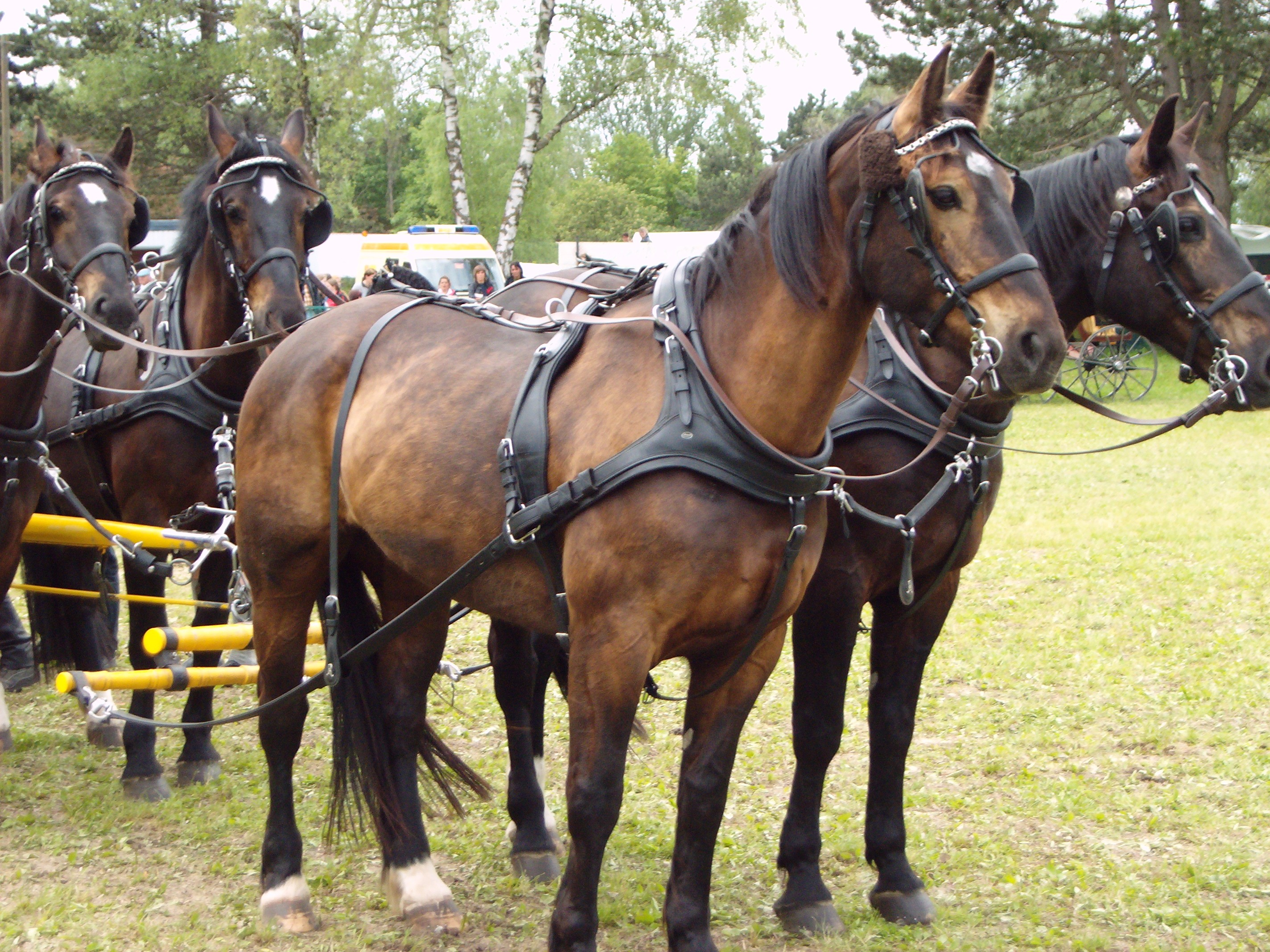
- Hybrid collars
  Hybrid collars are modern designs that offer flexibility for lighter work. These collars—which go by such names as sport collar, Hungarian collar, comfy collar, or Euro collar—start their construction similar to a breastcollar but then encircle the neck like a full collar, but without any hames, rigidity, or thick padding. Hybrid collars are popular with modern sport carriage driving such as competitive combined driving.

Collars are shaped to match the horse's neck conformation, which is critical for comfort and performance, and to reduce the risk of soreness and even injury. The three most common shapes are: full face, half sweeney, and full sweeney. The full face is for relatively straight or slender necks such as for carriage horses. The half sweeney is the most common shape for draft horses as it is heavily padded and allows for a thicker neck. The full sweeney is used for draft horses with extremely thick upper necks such as stallions have. The different collar shapes were invented to avoid "sweeney shoulder"—debilitating nerve damage that could end a horse's working career. (Note: The word "sweeney" comes from a medical condition in horses called "sweeney shoulder". Historically, the word "sweeney" referred to the particular muscle atrophy in the shoulder area caused by damage to a nerve—often due to poorly fitting collars pressing on the shoulder. The condition caused lameness and often ended a horse's working career. Over time, collar makers began using the term to describe collar shapes that accommodate different shoulder and neck builds, likely as a way to prevent the condition.)

=== Hames ===
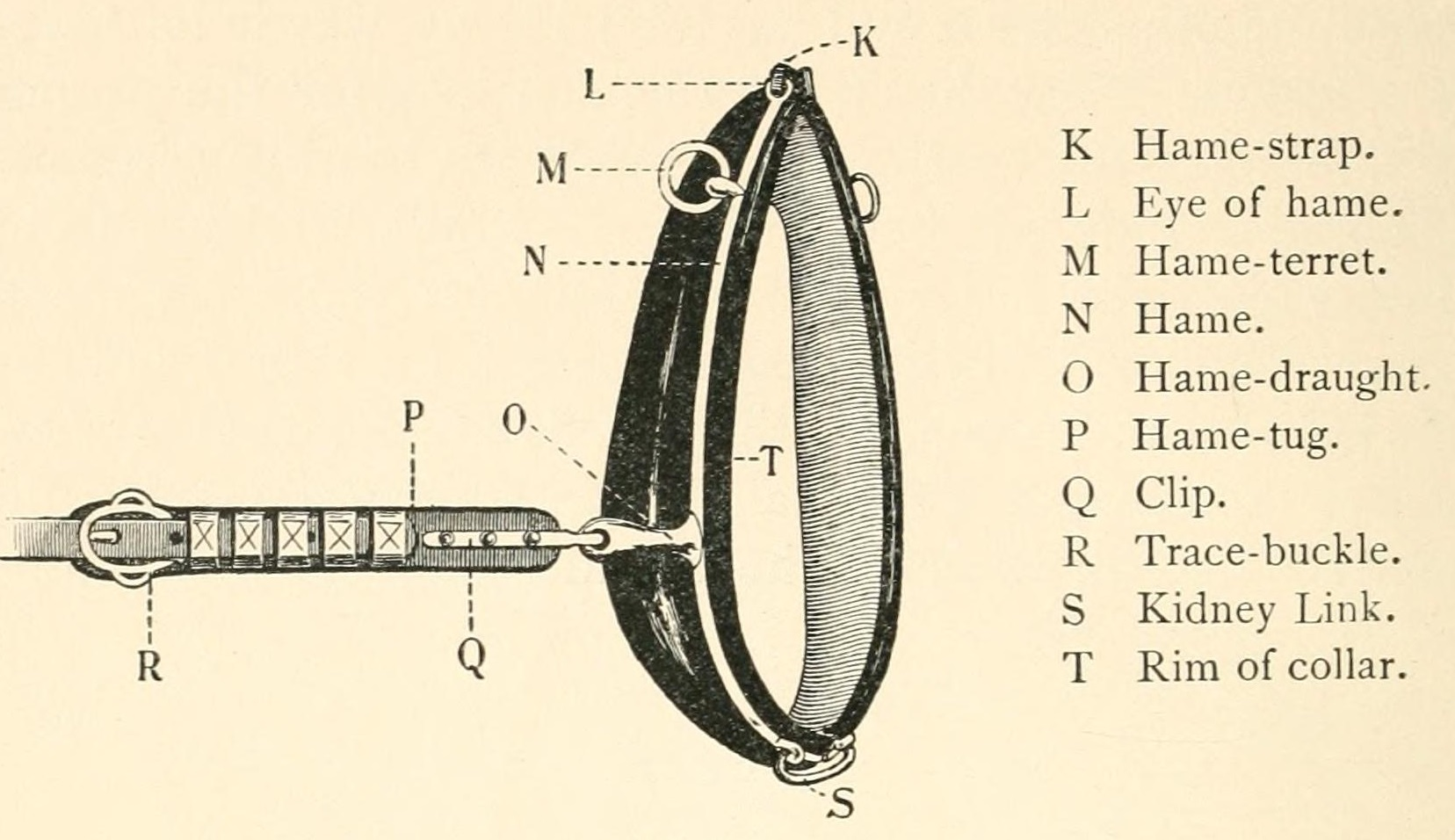
Diagram of hames

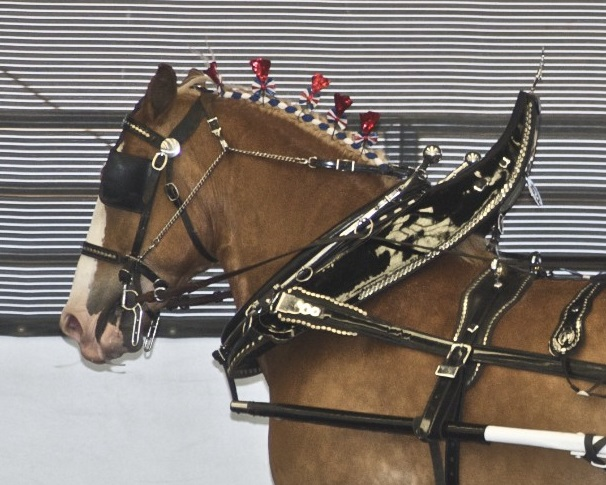
This show horse is wearing a decorative Scotch top over the collar in addition to horns on the top ends of the hames.

Hames are the rigid curved bars—usually made of wood or metal—that sit in the front-facing groove of a full collar. The hames are the rigid structure which maintains the shape and position of the collar; the collar pads the hames. The hames are the attachment point for the load—through the traces—and distributes the load onto the collar, and hence onto the horse's shoulders.

All full collars have hames unless the collar is constructed in a manner where the function is incorporated into the collar itself. Hames come as a pair which are connected at the bottom and top by a strap or metal links. Hames are usually made of wood, steel, or a combination. Steel hames can be solid or tubular, plated with brass or a white metal, painted, or left bare steel. Carriage hames typically lie flush along the collar, whereas farm harness hames often extend above the collar and end in "horns". Hames have terrets mounted on them—rings through which the reins pass. A false martingale is a strap which runs from the bottom of the collar, between the horse's legs, and attaches to the girth; it helps to hold down the collar and assists in holding the hames to the collar. In the US, collars for draft horse showing or parades often sport a tall pointy extension called hames covers or a Scotch top. (Note: Though the most commonly used term for the fancy tall-peaked collars on show draft horses in the USA are called "Scotch collars", the precise use of the word "Scotch" varies greatly. It might refer to a flat housing that lays over the actual collar (making a two-piece unit), or such housing might be incorporated into the collar itself as a single unit. The tall extension might be referred to as a "Scotch top" or a "Scotch spire". A "Scotch collar" may also refer to a flatter, wider collar with minimal stuffing that may or may not be highly decorated, has a cap on the top, and is used for lighter work.)

Properly fitted hames must match the length and curvature of the collar. If misaligned, they can dig into the horse's withers or cause discomfort when the horse lowers its head. Modern hames often include adjustable buckles and reinforced joints to accommodate different collar styles and horse sizes.

== History ==
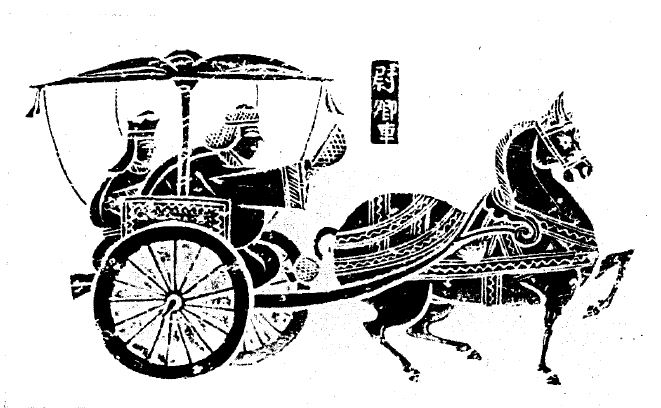
The breast-collar harness, used in China from the ancient to medieval era, c. 147

Early horse-drawn vehicles used simple throat-and-girth harnesses that restricted a horse's breathing and limited the amount of weight it could pull. These early harnesses placed the load on a strap around the horse's barrel (a surcingle), while a breastplate around the neck and chest mainly prevented the surcingle from slipping back. As a result, the horse pulled the load from its middle rather than pushing into it with its chest, as it does with breastcollar and horse collar harnesses. In ancient China, the development of the breastcollar harness improved traction by placing the load across the horse's chest rather than its neck. The final major innovation was the rigid, padded horse collar, invented in China by the early medieval period. By distributing weight across the horse's shoulders, the collar allowed horses to exert their full strength and pull significantly heavier loads. The collar spread westward and became common in Europe by the 12th century, transforming both transport and agriculture.

=== China ===
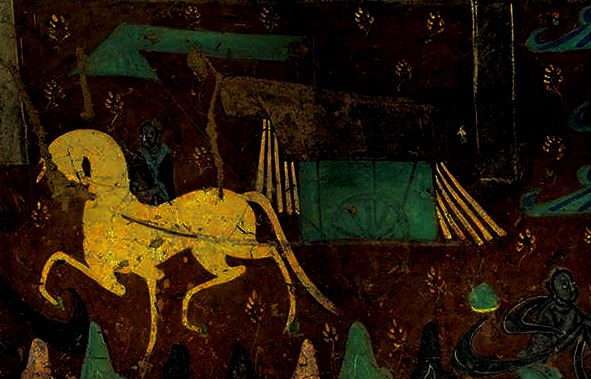
Earliest depiction of a horse collar, c. 477–499, Northern Wei

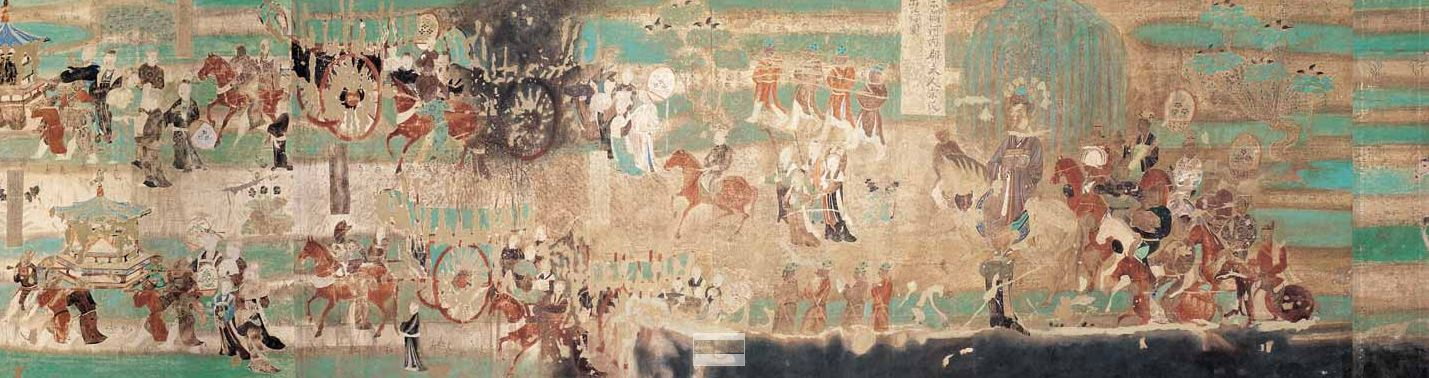
Zhang Yichao's victory procession, showing horse collars for carriage pulling, c. 851

The first questionable depiction of a horse collar in art appears on painted moulded-bricks in the Three Kingdoms (220–265 AD) era tomb of Bao Sanniang at Zhaohua, Sichuan province, China. These paintings display an amply padded horse collar with no sign of a yoke. However, the earliest legitimate depiction of it in art is on a Dunhuang cave mural (cave 257) from the Chinese Northern Wei dynasty, the painting dated to 477–499 AD. In this painting the arching cross bar is clear, but the artist failed to clearly show the cushioned collar behind it, without which the whole design would have been rendered useless.

The same basic design is seen in other painted Chinese frescoes, one from 520 to 524 AD (with shafts projecting beyond the horses chest for sternal traction), and another circa 600 AD (Sui dynasty). This Sui dynasty depiction (in cave 302) is of particular interest, since its depiction of the horse collar is not only more accurate (the same seen even in north and northwest China today), but it is used for a camel, not a horse. The Chinese had used camels often from the 2nd century BC onwards during the Han dynasty, and there was even a Camel Corps serving the military on the frontier of the Tarim Basin. However, the adapted horse collar for camels would not have been common until the 6th century. In cave 156, there is a panorama painting of the Tang dynasty Chinese general and provincial governor Zhang Yichao riding triumphantly after the recapture and conquest of the Dunhuang region from the Tibetan Empire in 834 AD. According to evidence provided by Dr. Chang Shuhong, the date of the painting is precisely 851 AD, yet Needham points out that there is universal consensus amongst historians that it was painted anytime between roughly 840 and 860 AD. This latter painting accurately depicts the horse collar, with a well-padded collar coming low on the chest and rising behind the cross-bar.

=== Europe ===
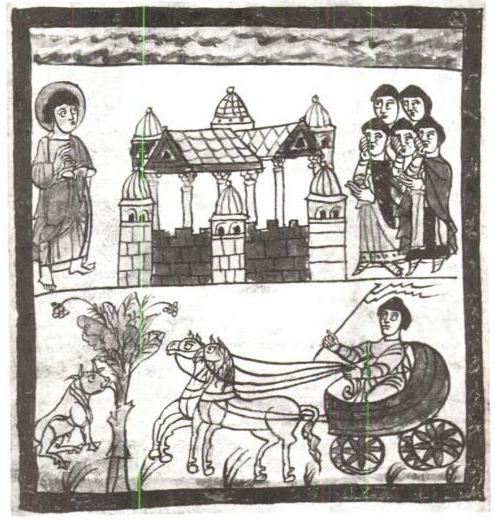
Earliest European depiction of a horse collar, c. 800 AD

Prior to the development of the horse collar, oxen still remained the primary choice of animal for farm labor, as only they could wear the earlier harnesses and collars without physical penalty. Additionally, the yoke used to harness oxen were made exclusive to each individual animal. However it was sometimes difficult to cultivate the land; based upon soil condition, it may have taken up to sixteen oxen to effectively use a single heavy plough. This made it difficult for farmers who lacked the capital to sustain such large numbers.

Following the introduction of the horse collar to Europe and its use being clearly evident by 1000 AD, the use of horses for ploughing became more widespread. Horses work roughly 50 percent faster than oxen. With the collar, combined with the horseshoe, the heavy plough, and other developments in the agricultural system, the efficiency of the European peasant farmer in producing food increased, allowing further societal development in Europe. The surplus in food allowed labor specialization as farmers could change their occupation and focus on other skills, such as the purchase and selling of goods, resulting in the emergence of a merchant class within European society. The horse collar was one of the factors in the ending of the feudal system and transition from the Middle Ages.

=== Experimental archaeology and reinterpretation ===
The French cavalry officer Lefebvre des Noëttes experimented with the ancient throat-and-girth harness in comparison the later trace breast-harness and then finally the matured form of the medieval collar harness. In his experiment of 1910, he found that two horses (aided by effective traction) using the throat-and-girth harness were limited to pulling about 1100 lbs. (1/2 ton). However, a single horse with a more efficient collar harness could draw a weight of about 1 1/2 tons.

However, the findings of Lefebvre des Noëttes were not without challenges, notably the argument that there was an early partial horse collar, a dorsal yoke system, dating to ancient Rome, and that Lefebvre's designs did not accurately reflect those actually used, but rather created an inaccurate design that was less efficient than any actual ancient harnesses used. While Lefebvre's experiments clearly demonstrated that the throat and girth design he used rode up on horses and cut off their air, images from ancient art and partial yokes found by archaeologists suggested that with proper placement and the addition of a stiff partial yoke, the breastcollar remained on the chest, and wind was not in fact cut off while pulling.

Further studies conducted in 1977 by Spruytte and Mary Aiken Littauer, followed up by Georges Raepsaet, used more accurately reconstructed ancient harness designs and suggested that horses using these early systems could pull nearly as much as with the later horse collar. These researchers argued that the primary advantage of the fully developed collar was not raw pulling power but the lower point of attachment it allowed, which made horses more effective for ploughing.

Spruytte also examined ancient artistic depictions of traction systems and argued that earlier scholars had misinterpreted them. He identified at least three early systems—shoulder traction (Egyptian), breast traction (Greek and Roman), and a mixed form—and demonstrated their effectiveness by building reproduction chariots and harnesses and testing them with live horses.

== See also ==
- Collar (animal)
- Horse harness
- Draft horse
- Oxbow
- Yoke
