= Alice Ekka =

Indian writer (1917–1978)

- Born: 8 September 1917; Ranchi, British India
- Died: 5 July 1978 (aged 60)
- Occupation: Writer
- Writing career
- Language: Hindi
- Years active: 1950s–1970s
- Genre: Short stories
- Subjects: Tribal life, social issues
- Notable work: Alice Ekka Ki Kahaniyan

Alice Ekka (Hindi: Elis Ekkā) (8 September 1917 – 5 July 1978) was an Indian Adivasi writer known to be the first female storyteller from a tribal background.

== Early life and career ==
Ekka was born in Ranchi on 8 September 1917, and was from the Munda community. She was the first tribal woman in Jharkhand to graduate in English, in 1938 at the Scottish Church College in Calcutta.

She wrote stories in Hindi, publishing in the 1950s, 1960s and 1970s. A collection of her stories, Alice Ekka Ki Kahaniyan, edited by Vandna Tete, (Radhakrishna Prakashan, ISBN 978-8183617918) was published posthumously in 2015.

Her stories in the 1960s were published in the weekly magazine Adivasi Patrika.

She is described as "India's first female tribal storyteller", and the centenary of her birth was celebrated with a two-day conference, the "All India Tribal Women Writer's Meet", held in her home town of Ranchi.
