= Richard Lefebvre des Noëttes =

Richard Lefebvre des Noëttes (1856–1936) was a French military officer and early historian of technology.

After his early retirement from the French army in 1901, Lefebvre devoted his time to technological studies, then quite a new field, becoming a main proponent of the negative impact of slavery on technological progress in classical antiquity. Although dissenting voices emerged as early as the 1930s, his primitivist views of ancient traction technology met with considerable success in the 1950s and 1960s when authorities like the medievalist Lynn White and the sinologist Joseph Needham, but also many classicists, relied rather uncritically on his research.

Based on a thorough reexamination of the pictorial evidence, much of it not available in Lefebvre's time, as well as experimental archaeology, modern scholars like Georges Raepsaet have refuted Lefebvre's findings, particularly his glaring underestimation of the capacities of ancient horse-drawn ploughs and carriages. His depreciation of the classical quarter-rudder in favour of the medieval stern-mounted rudder has also given way to a more balanced interpretation which argues that the two systems rather differed in the kinds of advantages they offered. Much unlike Lefebvre, recent scholarship has generally come to stress, within the productive limits characteristic of all pre-modern agricultural societies, the innovative character of Greek and Roman technology.
