= Tanga (cart) =

Type of cart

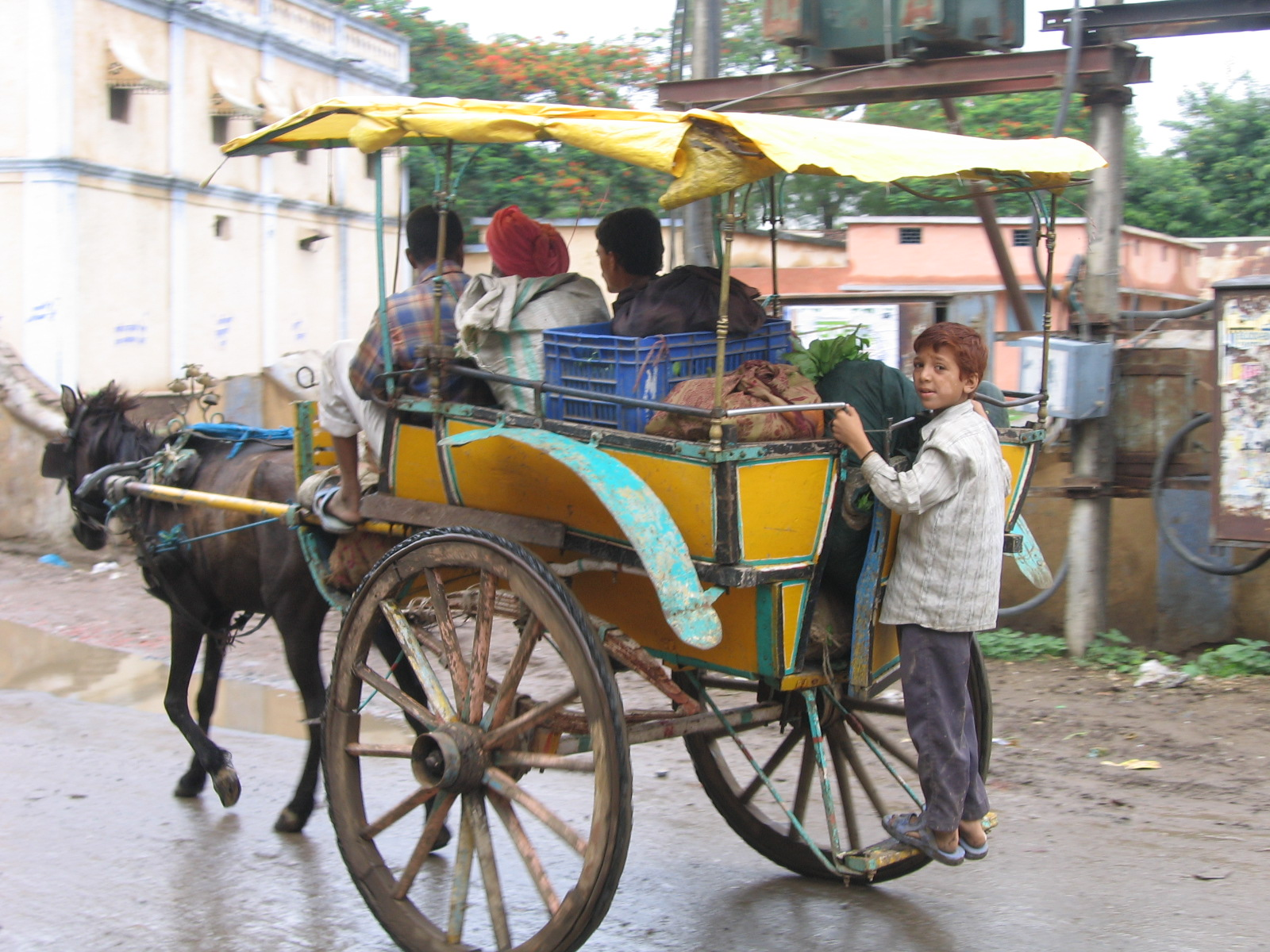
A tanga in Jaora, India

A tanga or tonga is a two-wheeled cart drawn by a single horse. It is used for transportation in the Indian subcontinent. There is a canopy over the body, one seat faces forward for the driver and one passenger, and one seat faces the rear for a second passenger. Some space is available for baggage below the carriage, between the wheels. This space is often used to carry hay for the horses.

Tangas were commonly used in Colonial India by British officers and civil servants. They were used in long distance mail routes and travel, where they changed horses every few miles in the manner of stage stations (posting), averaging 8 miles per stage in rough terrain. Under such conditions, Tangas would be drawn by a pair of horses with a pole, but in contemporary times are pulled by a single horse.

Tangas were popular before the advent of automobiles and are still in use in some parts of the Indian subcontinent. They are a popular mode of transportation because they are fun to ride in, and are usually cheaper to hire than a taxi or rickshaw. However, in many cities, tangas are not allowed to use highways because of their slow pace. In Pakistan, tangas are mainly found in the older parts of cities and towns, and are becoming less popular for utilitarian travel and more popular for pleasure. Tangas have become a traditional feature of weddings and other social functions in parts of the Indian subcontinent.

In India, tangas are also found in rural areas of North India like Uttar Pradesh, Rajasthan, Madhya Pradesh, and Punjab. Apart from the modern modes of transport, tangas still offer services at the entrance of bus stops and railway stations to transport luggage and passengers to their destinations in small towns of North India. The culture of the tanga is disappearing due to the speed of modern transportation and the earnings people make. However, there are still some that continue to support themselves and keep the tradition alive. Tourists who come to India still take rides in tangas to experience their Indian charm. They are still among the most appreciated experiences of North India.

Tangas in Lahore, Pakistan in 1987

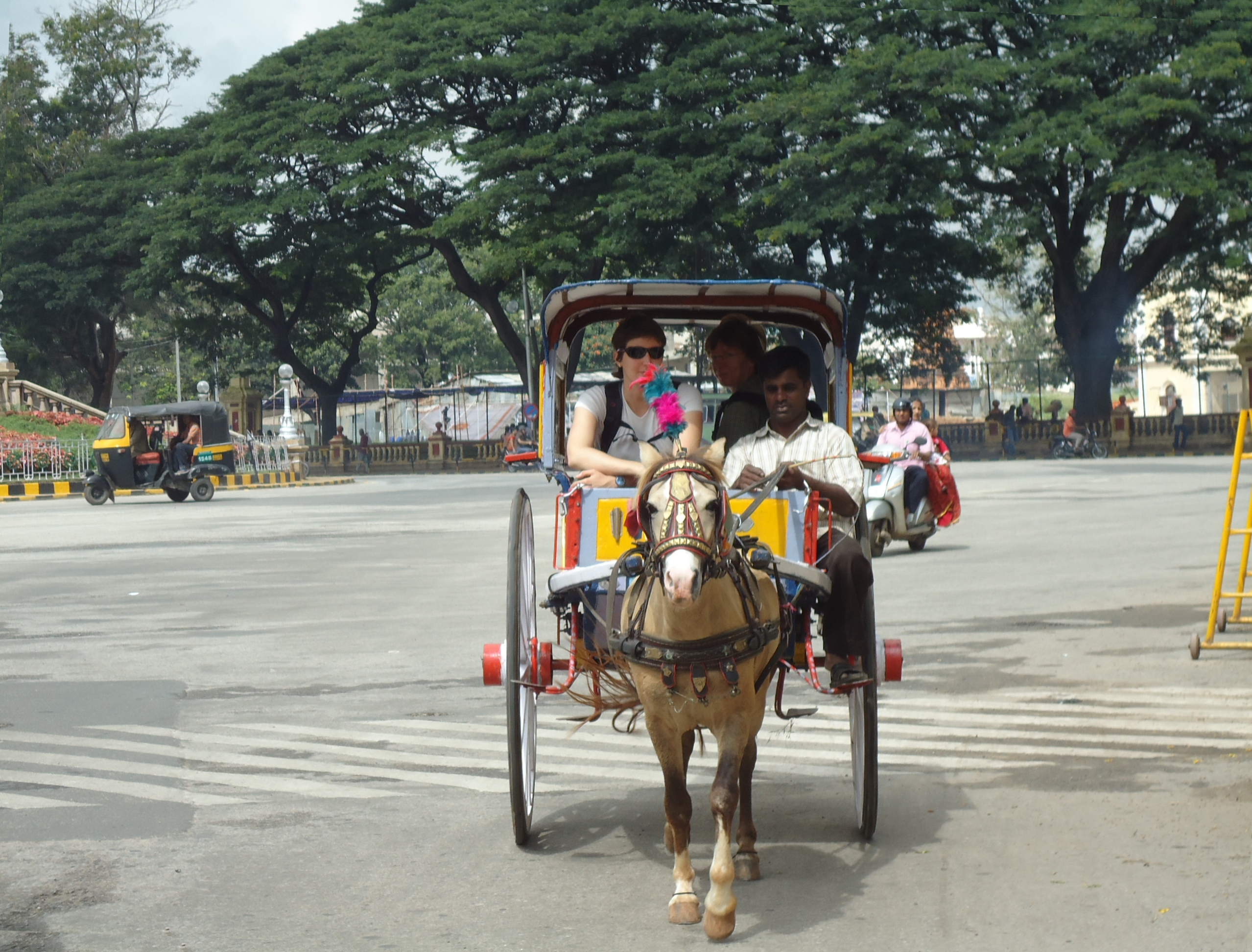
Tanga in Mysore, Karnataka, India

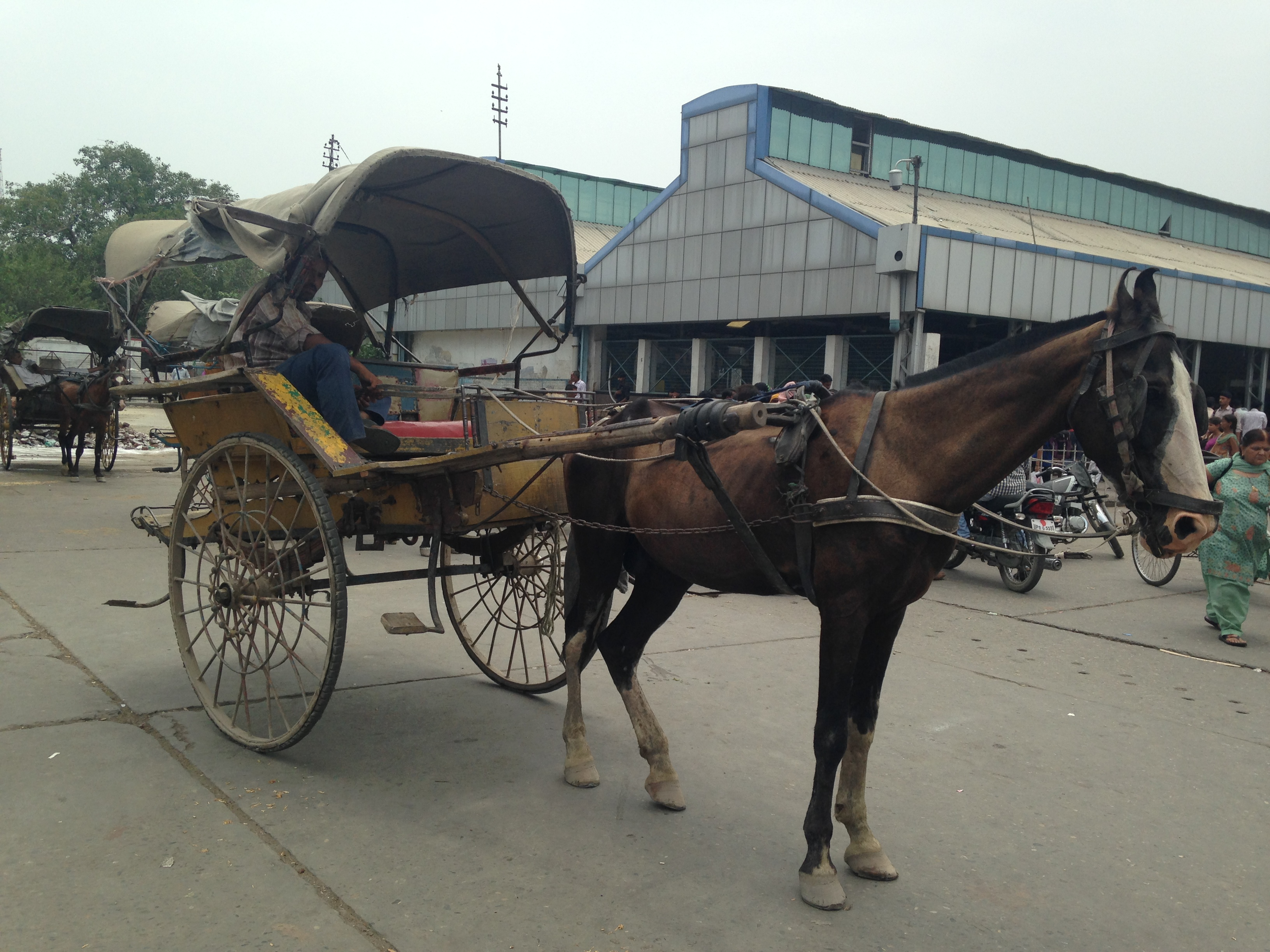
Tanga in Saharanpur, Uttar Pradesh, India

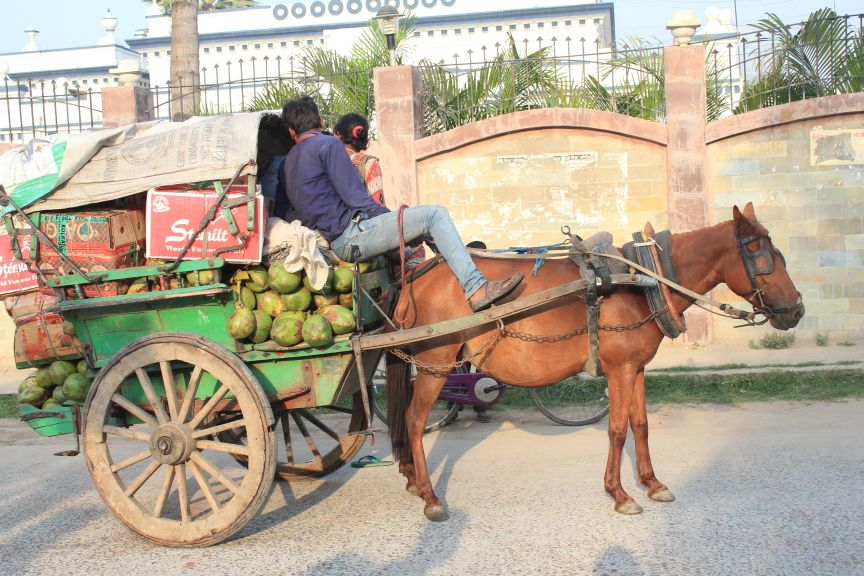
Tanga in Darbhanga, Bihar, India

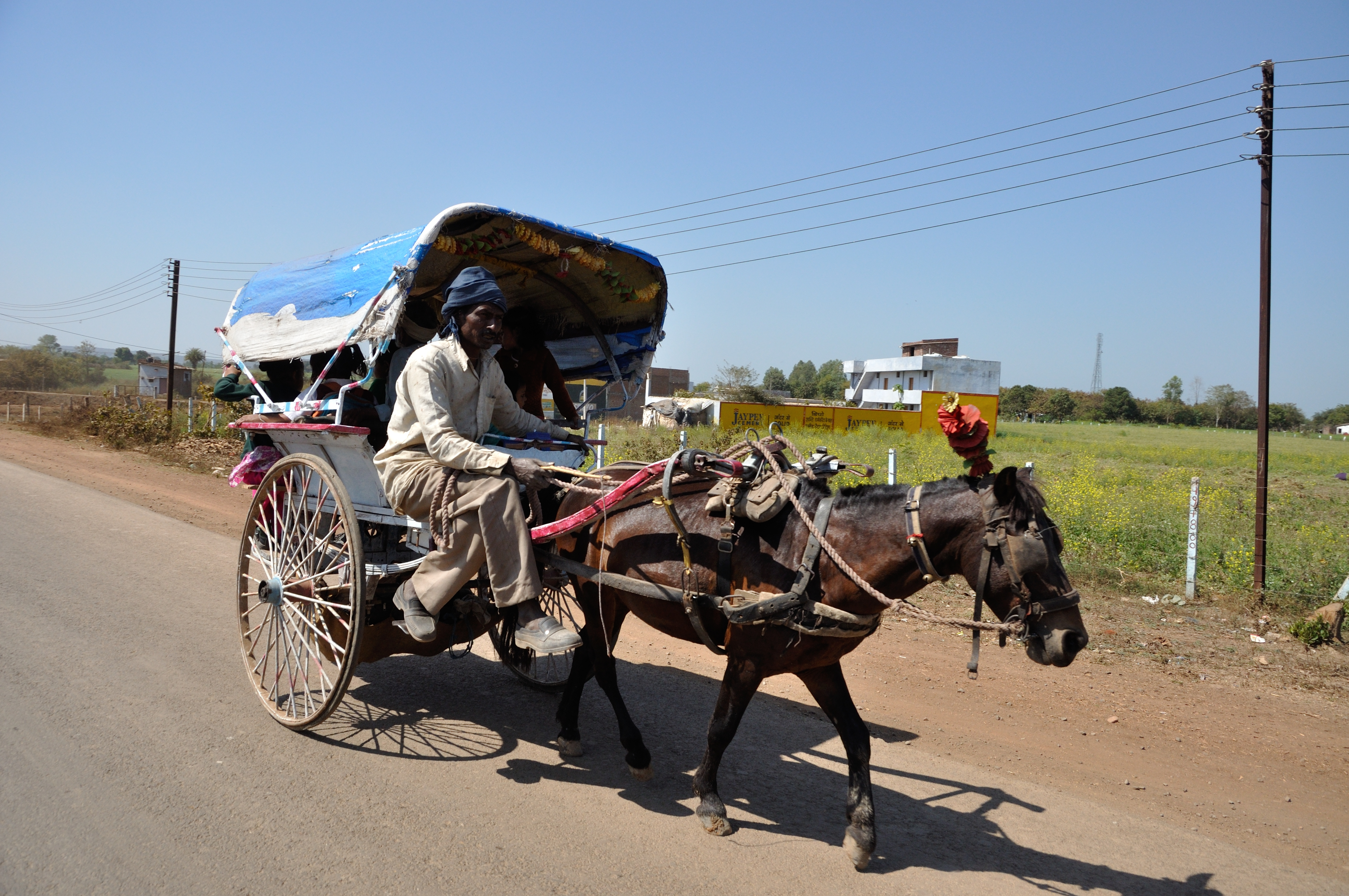
Tanga on the Indian National Highway 86 in India

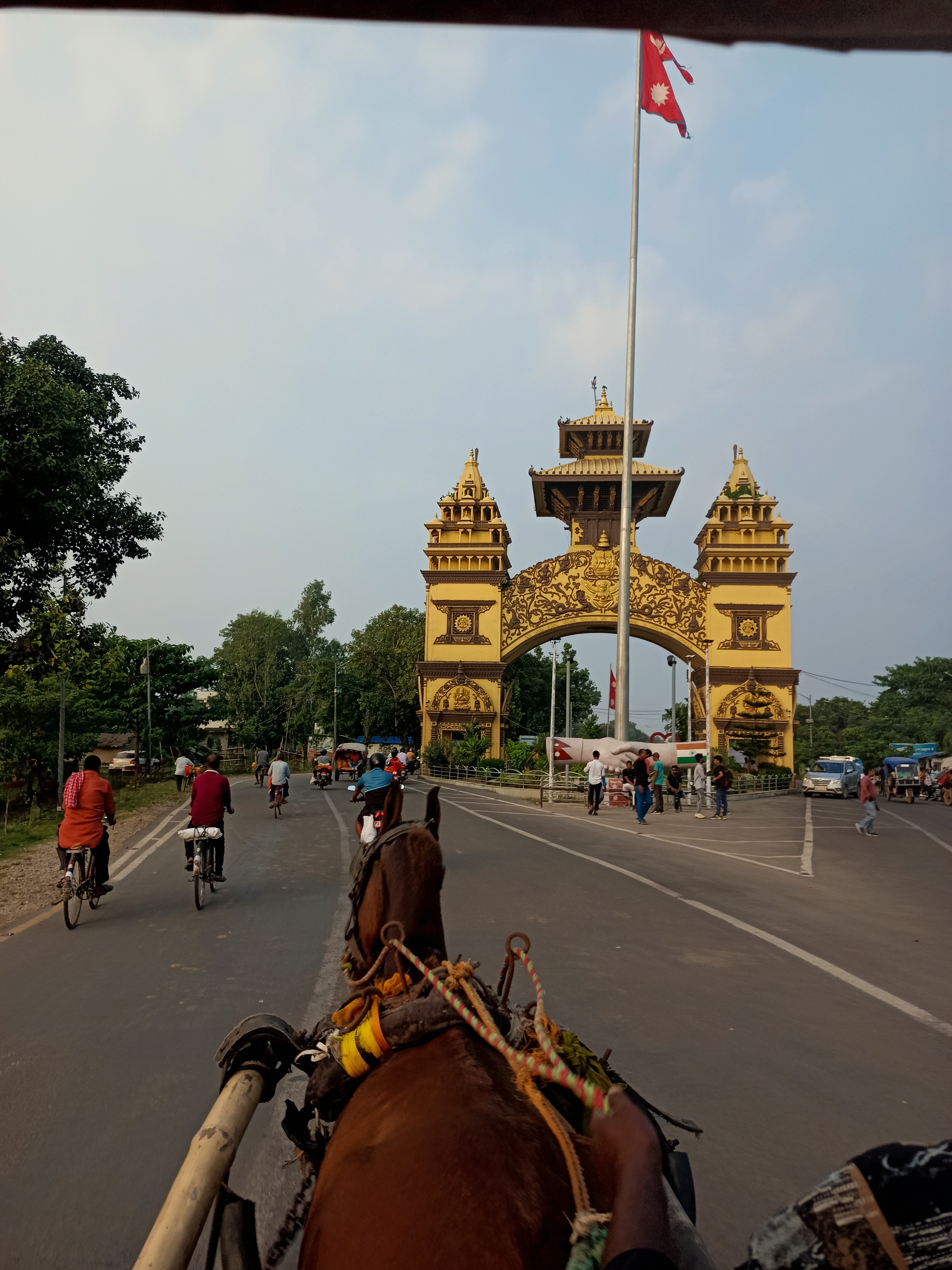
Tanga (cart) at Birgunj, entry gate of Nepal from north Bihar, India

== See also ==
- Ekka (carriage) — another Indian two-wheeled carriage
- Curricle — a similar style carriage to the tanga
