= Buggy (carriage) =

American four-wheeled carriage

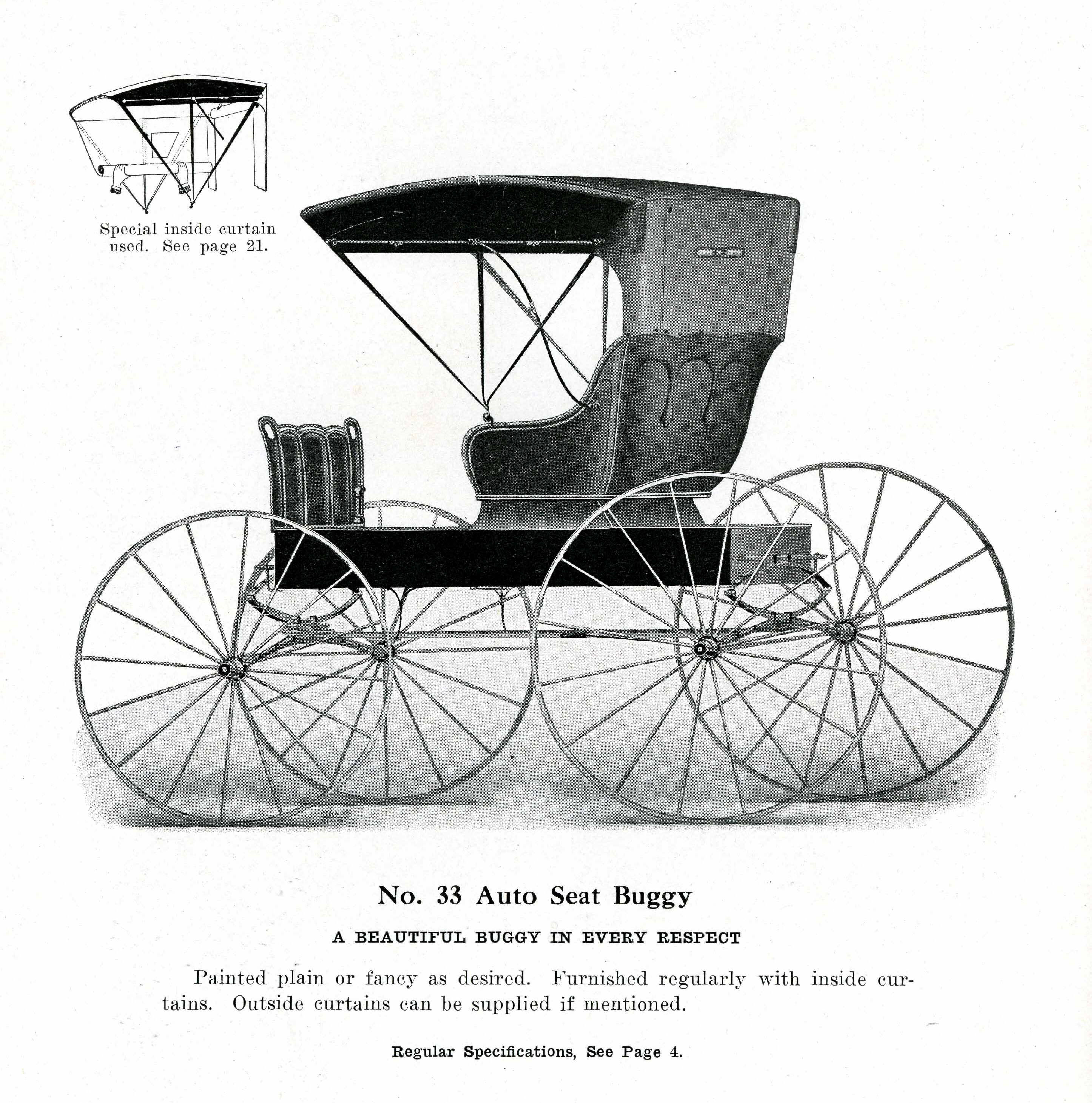
Buggy from Ahlbrand Carriage Co. catalog c. 1920

A buggy is an American lightweight four-wheeled carriage drawn by a single horse, though occasionally by two. Amish buggies are still regularly in use on the roadways of the United States. The word "buggy" has become a generic term for "carriage" in the United States. Historically, in England, a buggy was a two-wheeled vehicle.

== American buggy ==
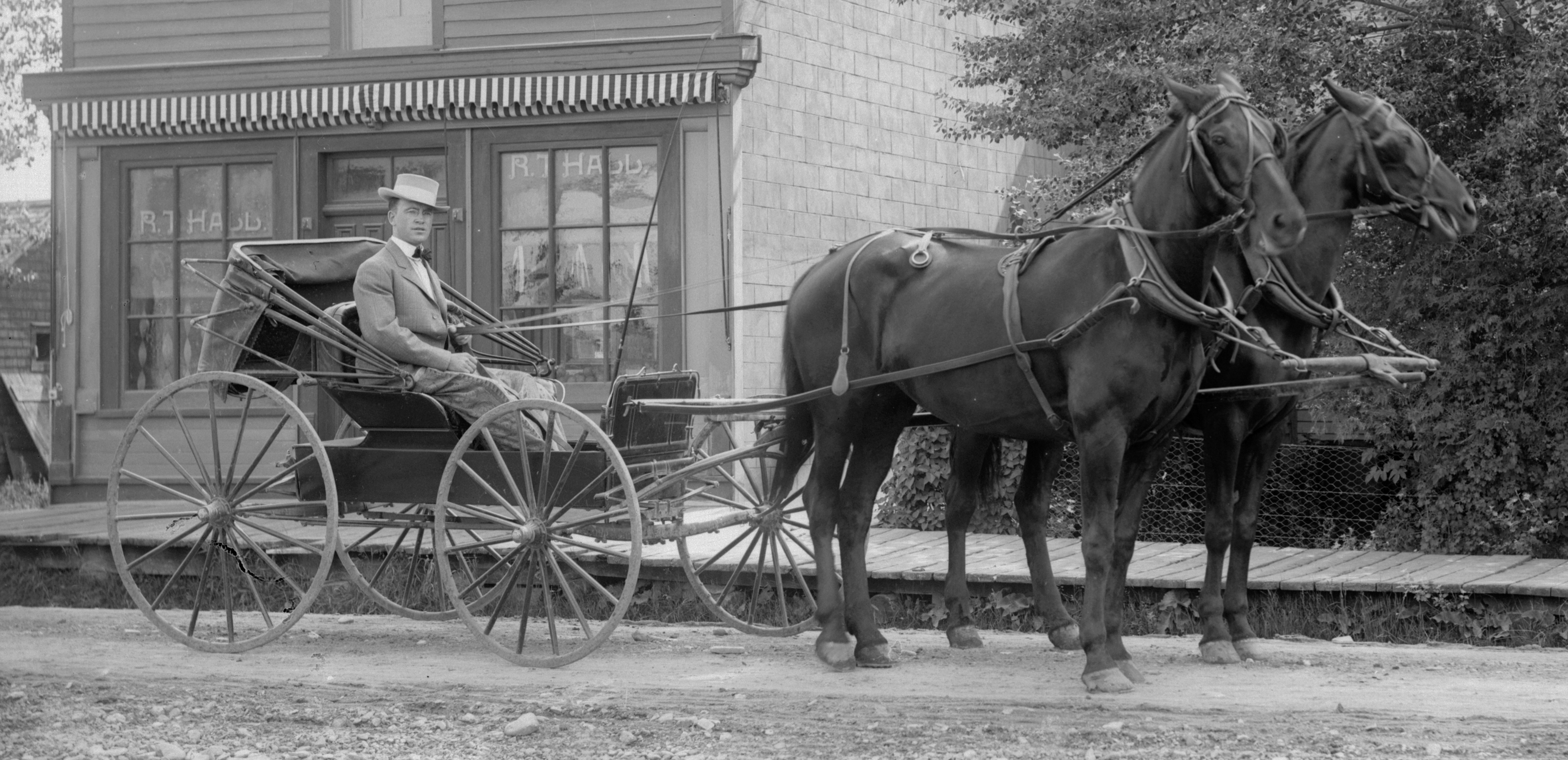
Buggy with a pair of horses c. 1900

A buggy is a four-wheeled American carriage made on a rectangular pattern, the body resembling a shallow box. There is a vertical leather dash with a metal rein rail on top. A single seat for two people is mounted in the middle of the box leaving room behind the seat for luggage. It is suspended by two sideways elliptic springs, one over the front axle and the other over the rear axle. The wheels are near equirotal, with the front wheels slightly smaller than the rear. Its turning radius is large, achieving only a quarter-lock before the front wheels touch the sides of the buggy body. There were many varieties built, such as adding a collapsible hood. The auto seat buggy had a curved seat similar to early motor cars.

The simple and lightweight American buggy was mass-produced, manufactured inexpensively, sold at modest prices, and widely distributed throughout the United States. It became the most common carriage in North America. According to the Museums at Stony Brook, "Trade journals praised the American system that allowed the production of the 'cheapest and best light vehicles for the money that are produced in the world' and boasted that 'every man among us who can afford to keep a horse can afford to have a good buggy'."

The buggy was so ubiquitous that the word "buggy" became the generic term for "carriage" in the US lexicon.

Other American vehicles patterned on the same "boxy" style include the Surrey (two or more seats, with or without a canopy or hood), and the spring wagon or road wagon (one or more seats, longer body, two elliptic springs on the rear axle instead of one sideways spring).

== Amish buggy ==
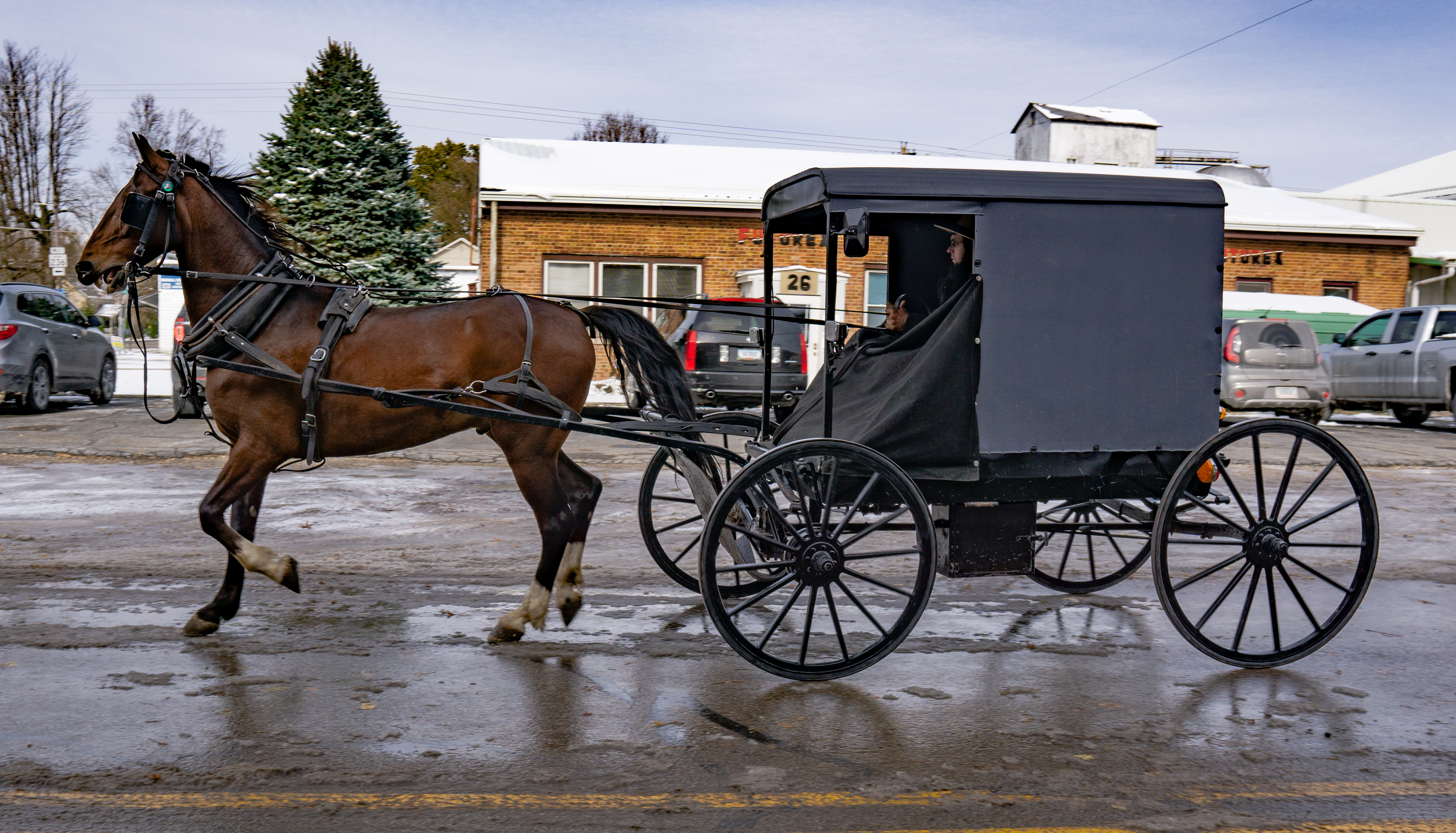
Contemporary Amish buggy (2019)

In the 21st century, the buggy is still used as everyday means of transportation by some Amish and Old Order Mennonite communities. The different styles of their buggies and the colors of the tops (black, grey, brown, yellow, white) can be used to distinguish one community from another, and even become part of a group's identity.

The Amish continue to manufacture buggies for their daily transportation; both open and enclosed designs are made. The open design is similar to how buggies across America have been made for well over a century. The enclosed version is unique to their communities and is enclosed on three sides with leather screens or rolldown blinds. Amish buggies are usually fitted with lamps for night driving and are driven by a single horse, predominantly Standardbreds.

== English buggy ==
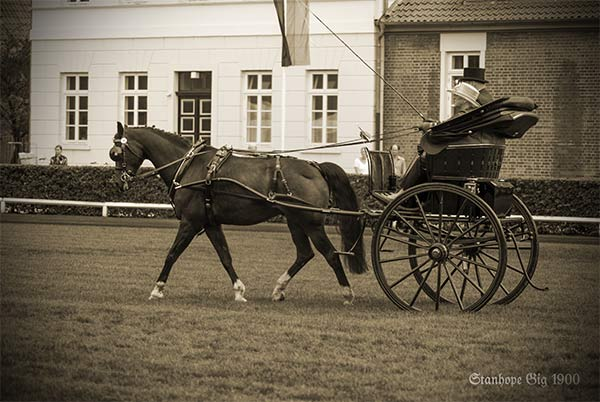
A gig with falling hood, was sometimes called a buggy

Parry and Walrond (both 1979) tell us that in England a gig fitted with a folding leather hood was sometimes called a buggy. According to William Felton (1796), a buggy is a chaise made to carry a single person. Adams (1837) suggests "Buggy", along with Stanhope and Tilbury, is one of the few English-named carriages, compared to the many French named carriage types such as Cabriolet and Vis-à-vis.

== "Horse and buggy" ==
The American phrase "horse and buggy" has become a catch-all that refers to any type of horse (or other equine) harnessed to a carriage, wagon or other wheeled vehicle. "Horse and buggy days" refers to the period when horse-drawn vehicles were the primary mode of transportation. Automobiles started being produced in the late 1800s, and by the 1920s the use of horse-drawn vehicles had declined significantly. In the UK, the term "carriage era" is more common.

== See also ==
- Driving (horse) – Use of horses to pull vehicles or equipment
- Equestrian use of roadways – Carriages and riders on roadways
- Horse harness – Device that connects a horse to a carriage or load
