= Stanhope (carriage) =

Two-wheeled English carriage of early 1810s

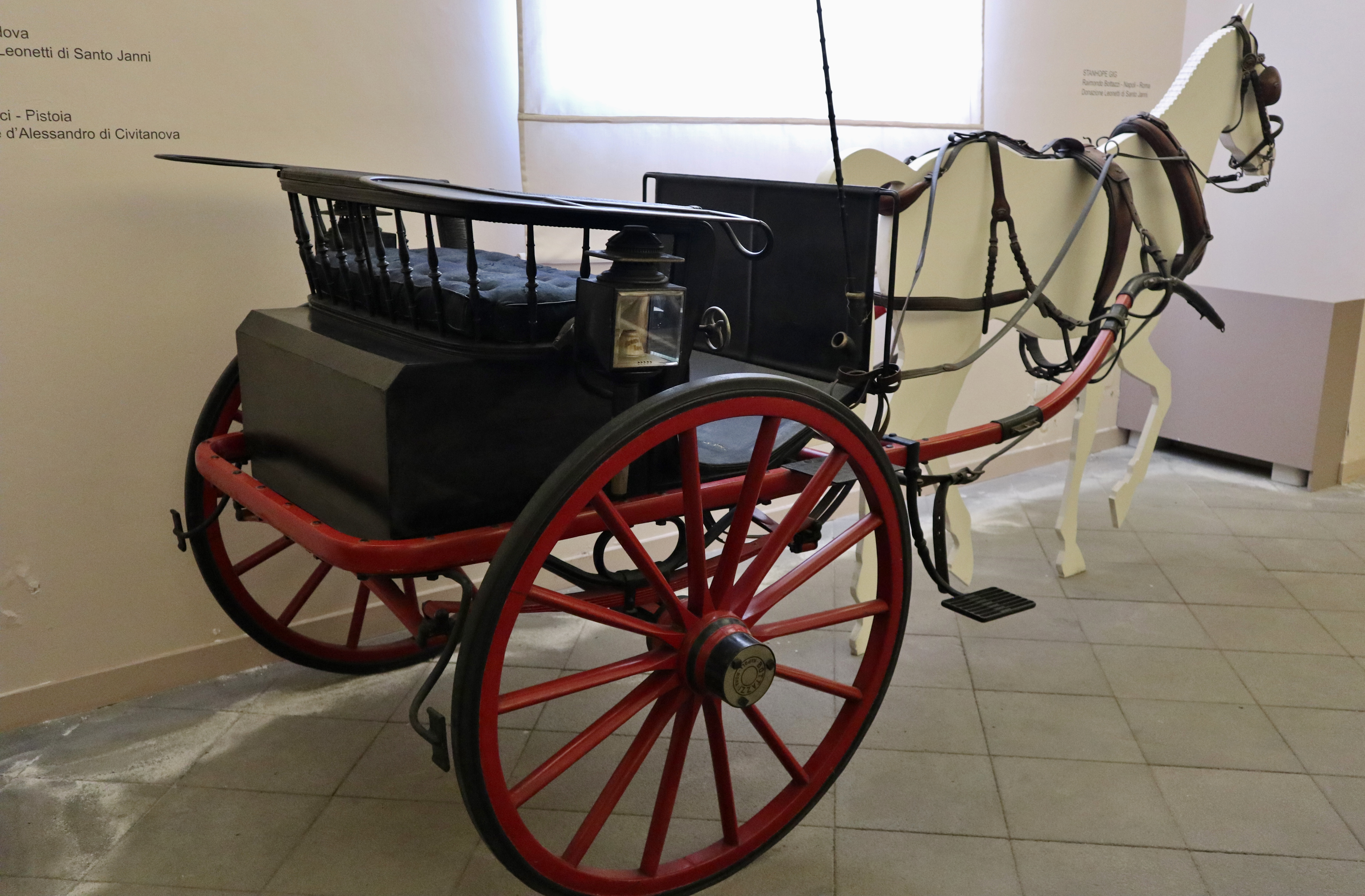
Stanhope gig in Italian carriage museum

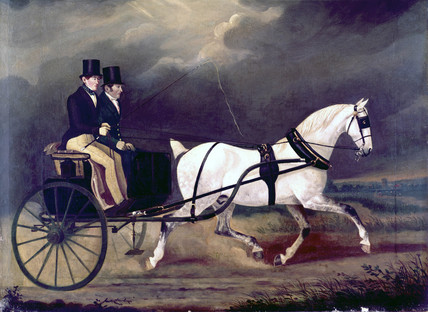
Painting of a Stanhope Gig c. 1815–1830

Stanhope refers to the Stanhope Gig, one of several English carriages named after its designer the Hon. Fitzroy Stanhope, a sportsman. (Note: There were multiple people referred to as "Hon. Fitzroy Stanhope", the name given in all contemporary sources. According to Straus (1912) and Gilbey (1905), this one was "brother of Lord Petersham", placing him as Rev. Hon. FitzRoy Henry Richard Stanhope (1787–1864), fifth son of Charles Stanhope, 3rd Earl of Harrington.)

== Overview ==
Stanhope designed several carriages, each bearing his name as was typical of the time period, and built by the London coachbuilder Tilbury. The first design, the Stanhope Gig built in the 1810s, was a gig with a storage boot under the seat, a crosswise seat for two, no hood or top, bent shafts reinforced with ironwork, and four springs.The next design was the Stanhope Buggy, an English buggy which is basically a lighter weight gig with a falling hood. He also designed the Stanhope Phaeton, a lightweight four-wheeled Phaeton carriage with two crosswise seats, a falling hood over the front seat, and the rear seat was for a servant or liveried groom. The shortened form "Stanhope" refers to the gig style, which by 1830 was the most common two-wheeled carriage seen around London. Many modern gigs are designed around the original Stanhope.

The Stanhope Gig's new spring design consisted of "four springs, two side and two cross, forming a square; these supported the body of the vehicle". The Stanhope springs configuration was used on many gigs and carriages. Fitzroy Stanhope also designed the Tilbury gig, this time named after the builder, which omitted the storage boot and had a seven-spring configuration.

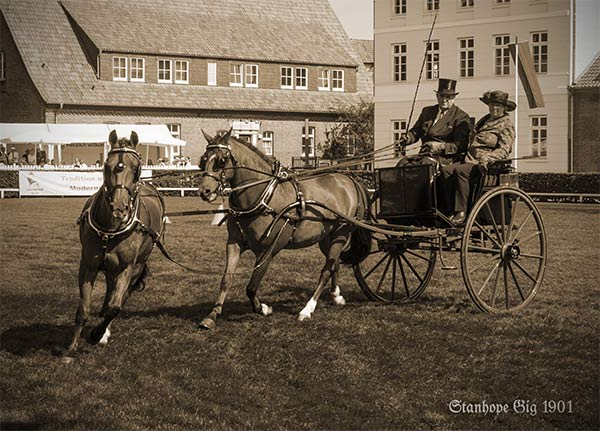
Stanhope Gig

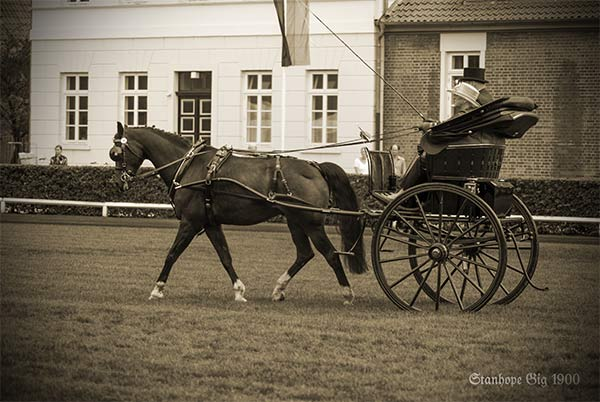
Stanhope Buggy

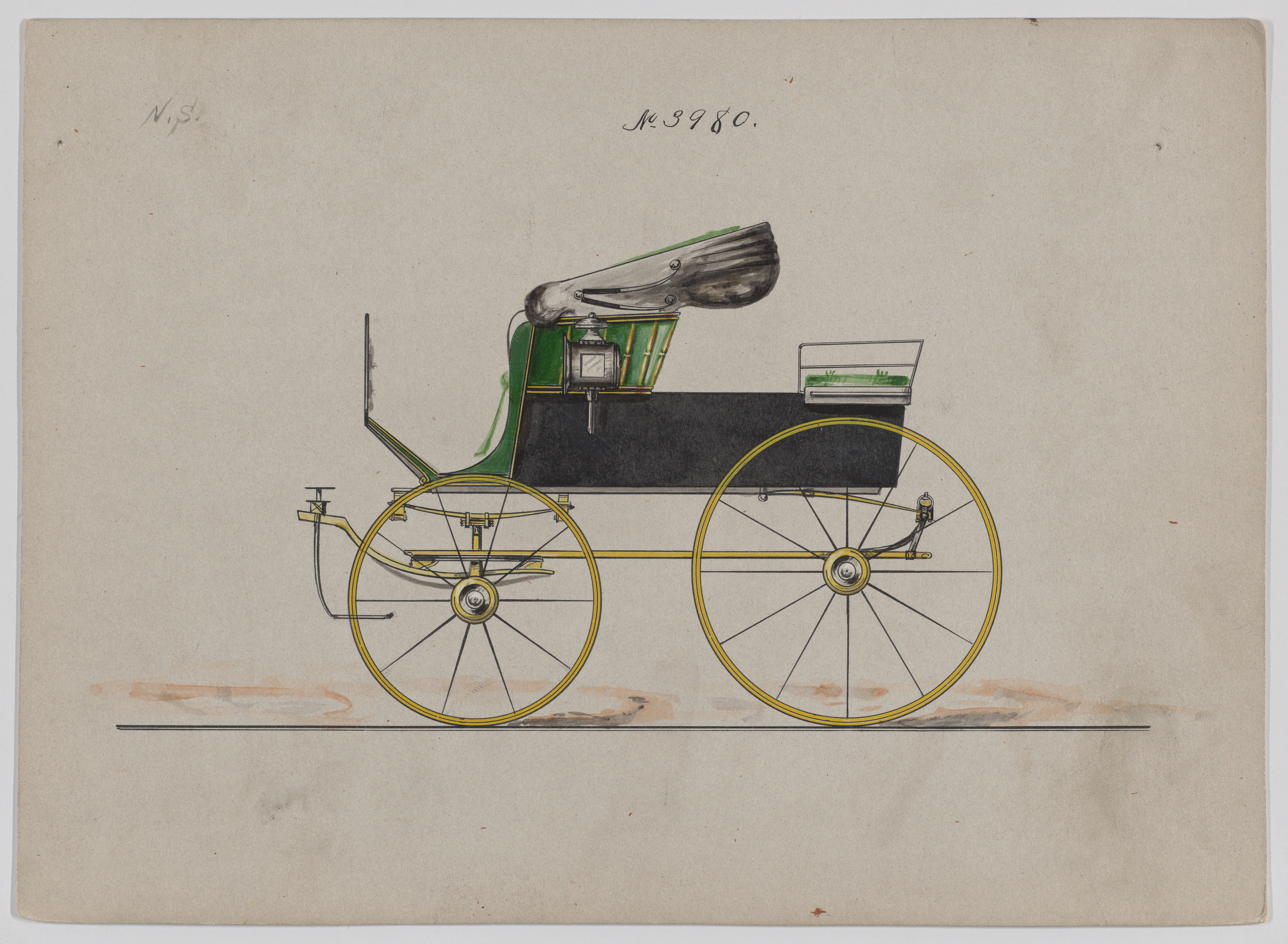
Stanhope Phaeton

== See also ==
- Tilbury (carriage)
- Stanhope (car), an early auto body
