= Equestrian use of roadways =

Carriages and riders on roadways

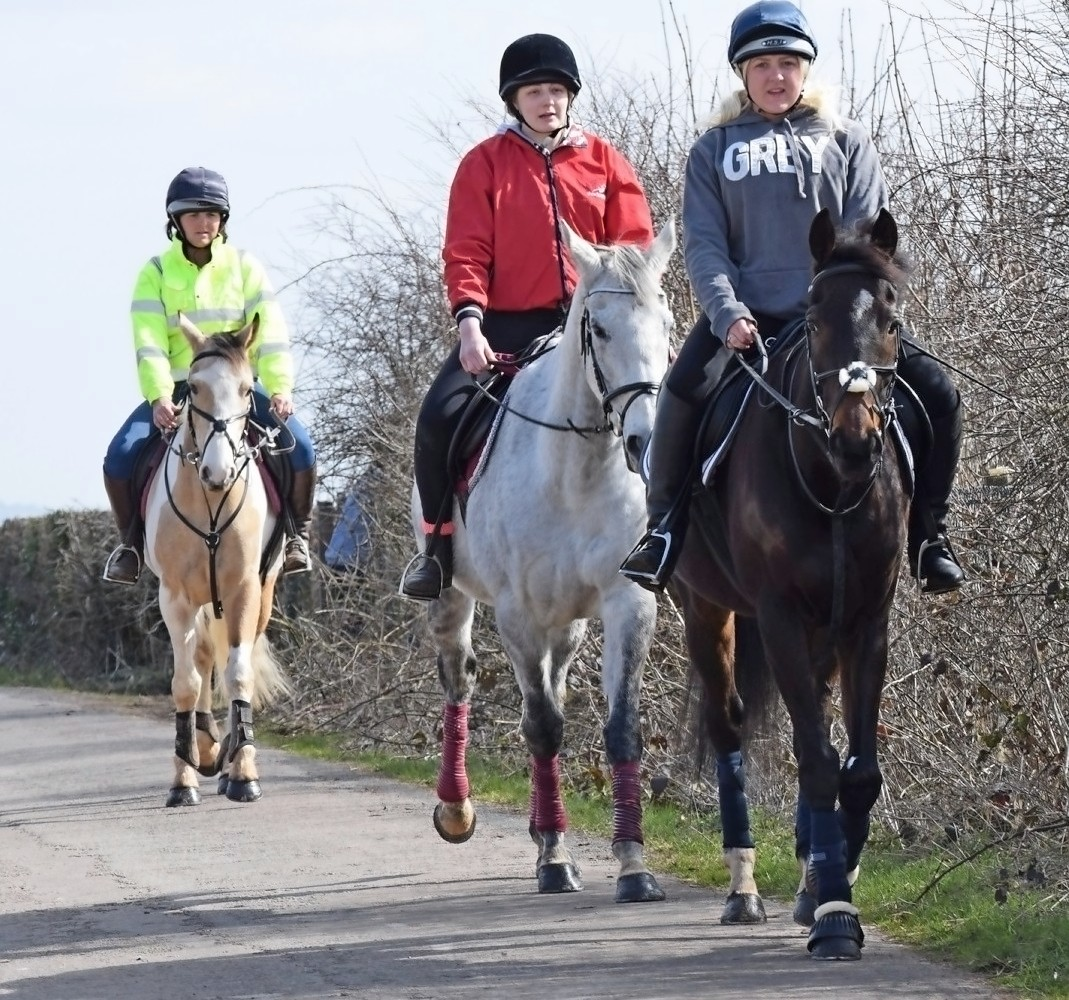
Horse riders on the roadway in England

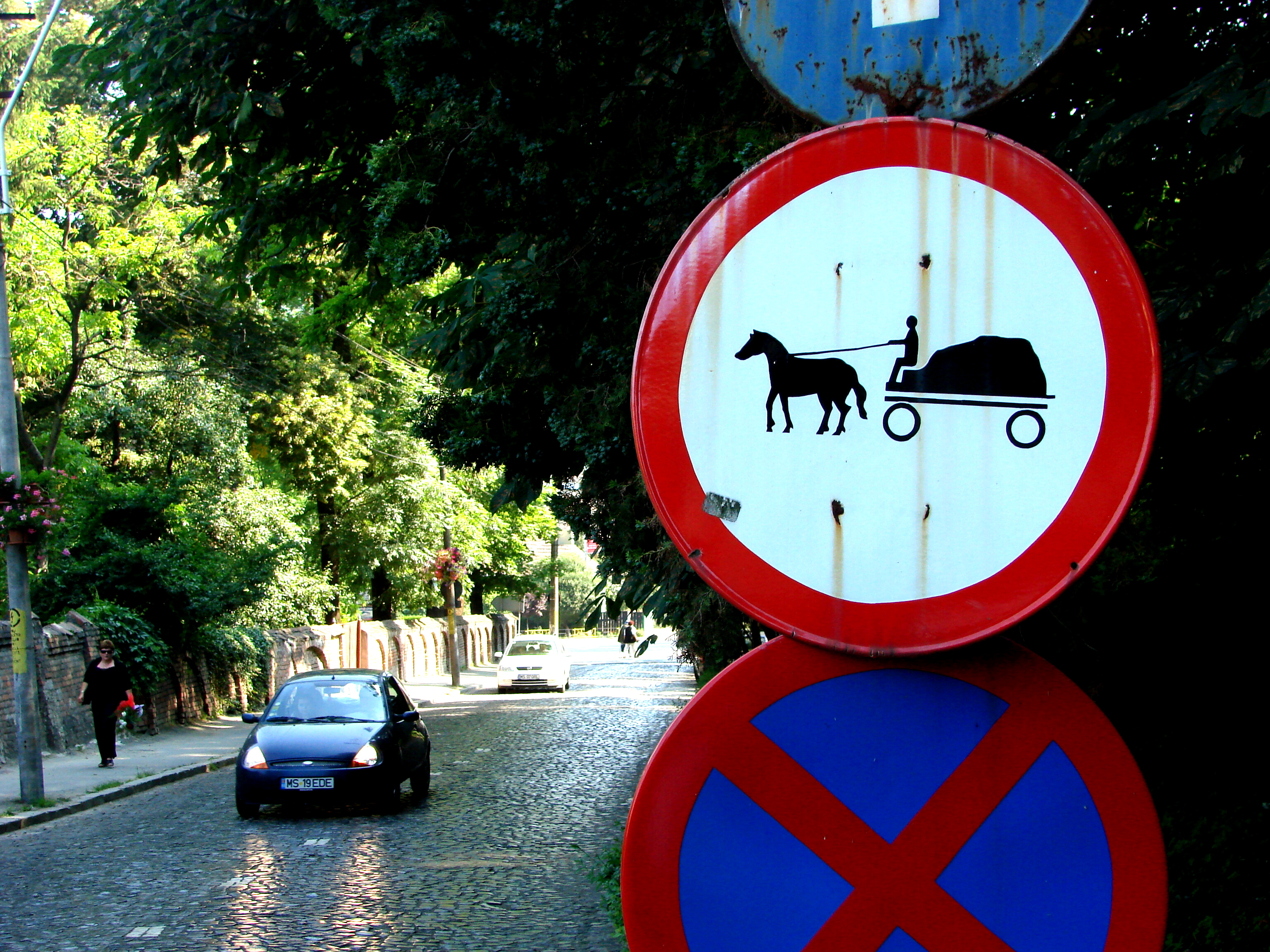
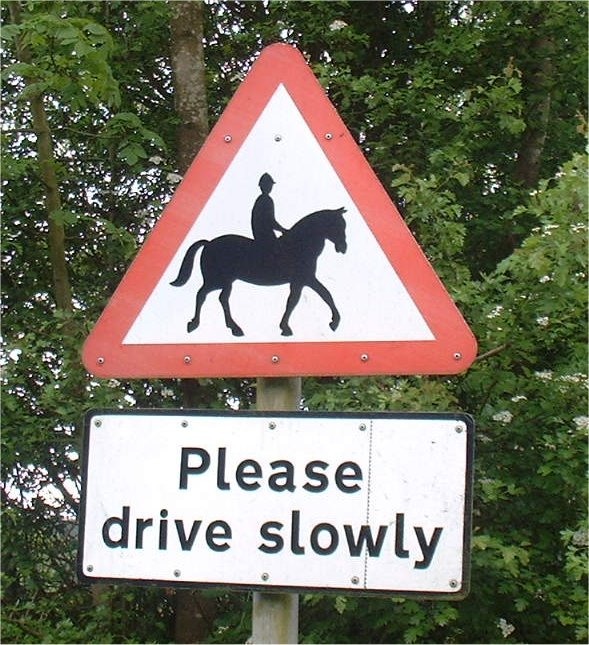
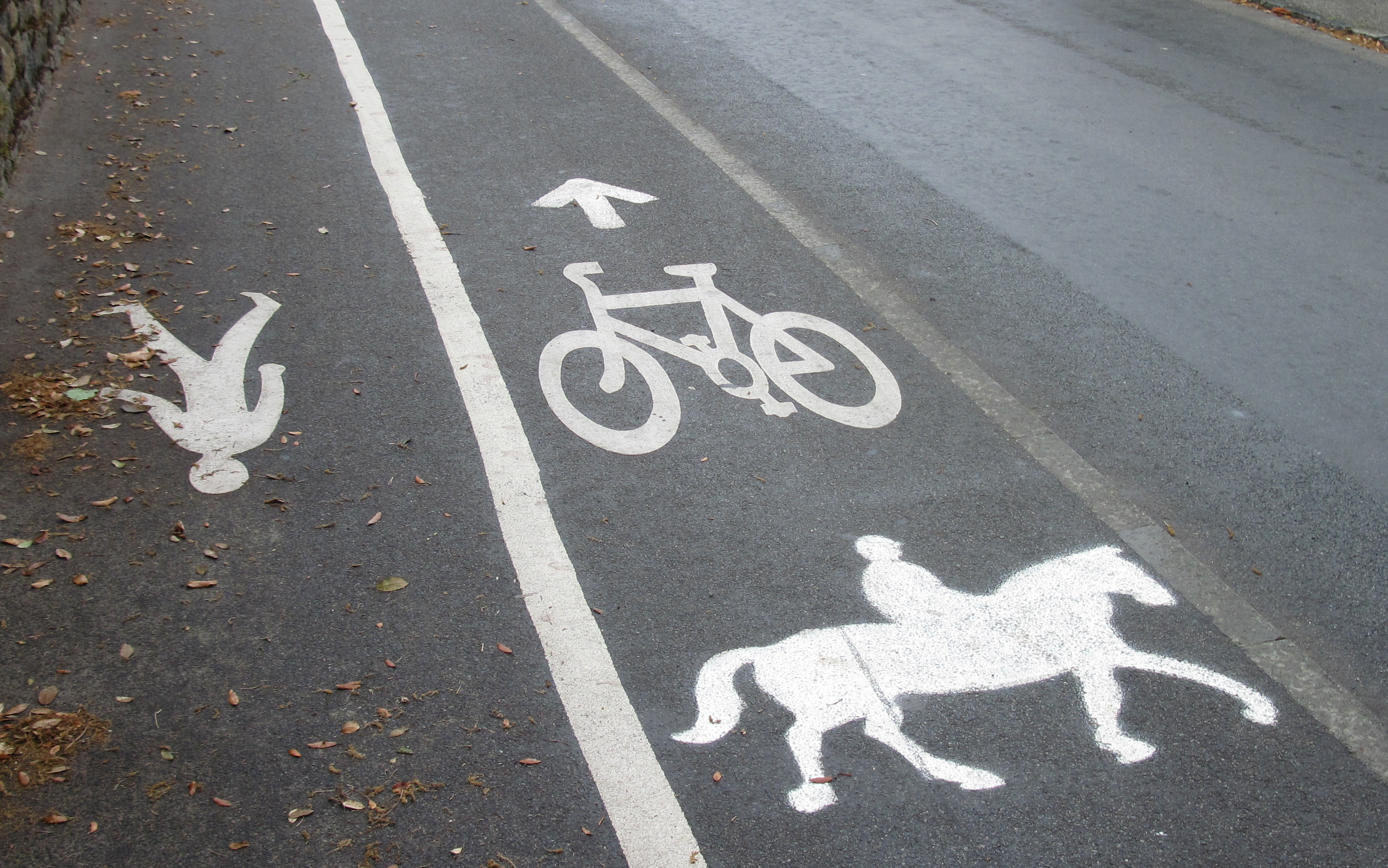
A variety of horse-related road signs from around the world.

The use of horses for transportation, either by horseback riding or by driving carriages and wagons on roads, was the primary form of transportation before the advent of automobiles in the late 19th century. However, horses are still used for transport in many parts of the world, including places where certain sects such as the Amish reside. Horses are also ridden on the roads for pleasure, for example travelling from their stables to bridle paths and trails. Equestrians and motorists should take safety precautions to avoid serious accidents when sharing the roadways.

== Amish communities ==
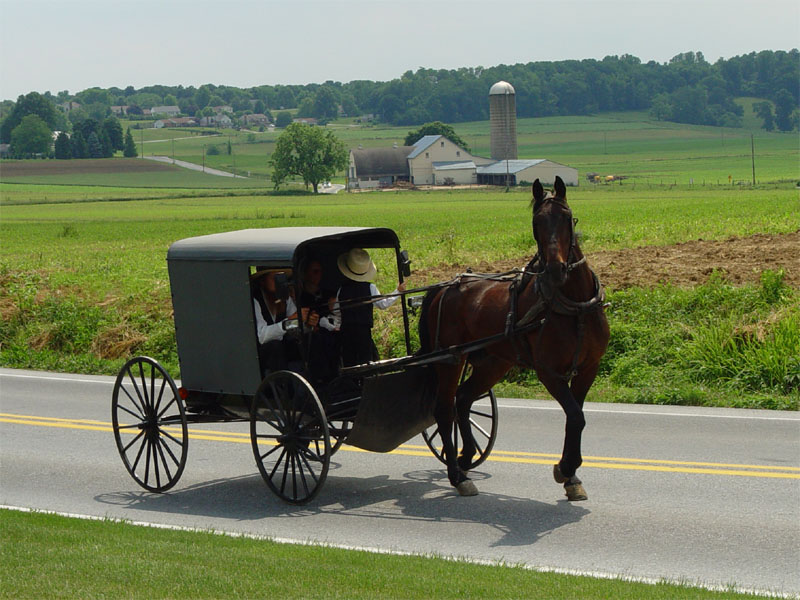
A typical Amish buggy in Lancaster County, Pennsylvania

Throughout history, transportation using horse-drawn vehicles has developed into a more modern realm, eventually becoming today's automobile. However, in certain areas of Ohio and Pennsylvania, horse and buggy is the main form of transportation. The Amish, Mennonite, and the Brethren community can be dated back to as early as the sixteenth century. In the eighteen hundreds, members of their conservative Christian faith fled Europe and began a new life in a small county in Pennsylvania called Lancaster. They are best known for their simple lifestyles, including having limited forms of electricity, living off the land, and having very conservative viewpoints on a number of topics. Many families have adapted to the modern age and now allow some forms of technology, as long as it does not interrupt or affect family time. Amish are forbidden to own cars but are allowed to ride in them when needed. That is why the Amish, Mennonite, and Brethren populations use horse and buggy as their main mode of transportation.

== Accidents ==
Ohio and Pennsylvania both have large populations of Amish and Mennonite using horse-drawn buggies as their primary means of transportation. There are a significant number of buggy-motor vehicle collisions each year. The primary crash is during daylight on straight roadways with no adverse weather conditions. Most accidents are by locals to whom buggies are a common sight, rather than tourists who slow down with the novelty. The usual cause is "following too closely", resulting in a rear-end crash to the buggy. One report said Pennsylvania and Ohio average 60 buggy/motor vehicle crashes per year, another report said Ohio reports more than 120 buggy accidents a year. Pennsylvania reported a high of 78 such crashes in 2006.

Such accidents are often fatal to the carriage occupants, or involve serious injuries from having been struck or thrown from the carriage. Horses are often killed outright, or have to be euthanized after sustaining serious injuries. These accidents are costly—motor vehicles can be seriously damaged by hitting a large animal such as a horse, and buggies are usually demolished.

It doesn't take much for a motor vehicle crashing with a carriage to cause fatalities. In England, two men and the horse pulling a trap were declared dead at the scene of a collision with a Volkswagen Golf, a compact car.

Riders are equally at risk. They can be struck by motor vehicles, or be thrown from their horse which was spooked by a motorcycle or vehicles passing too closely.

== Safety precautions ==
=== Visibility ===
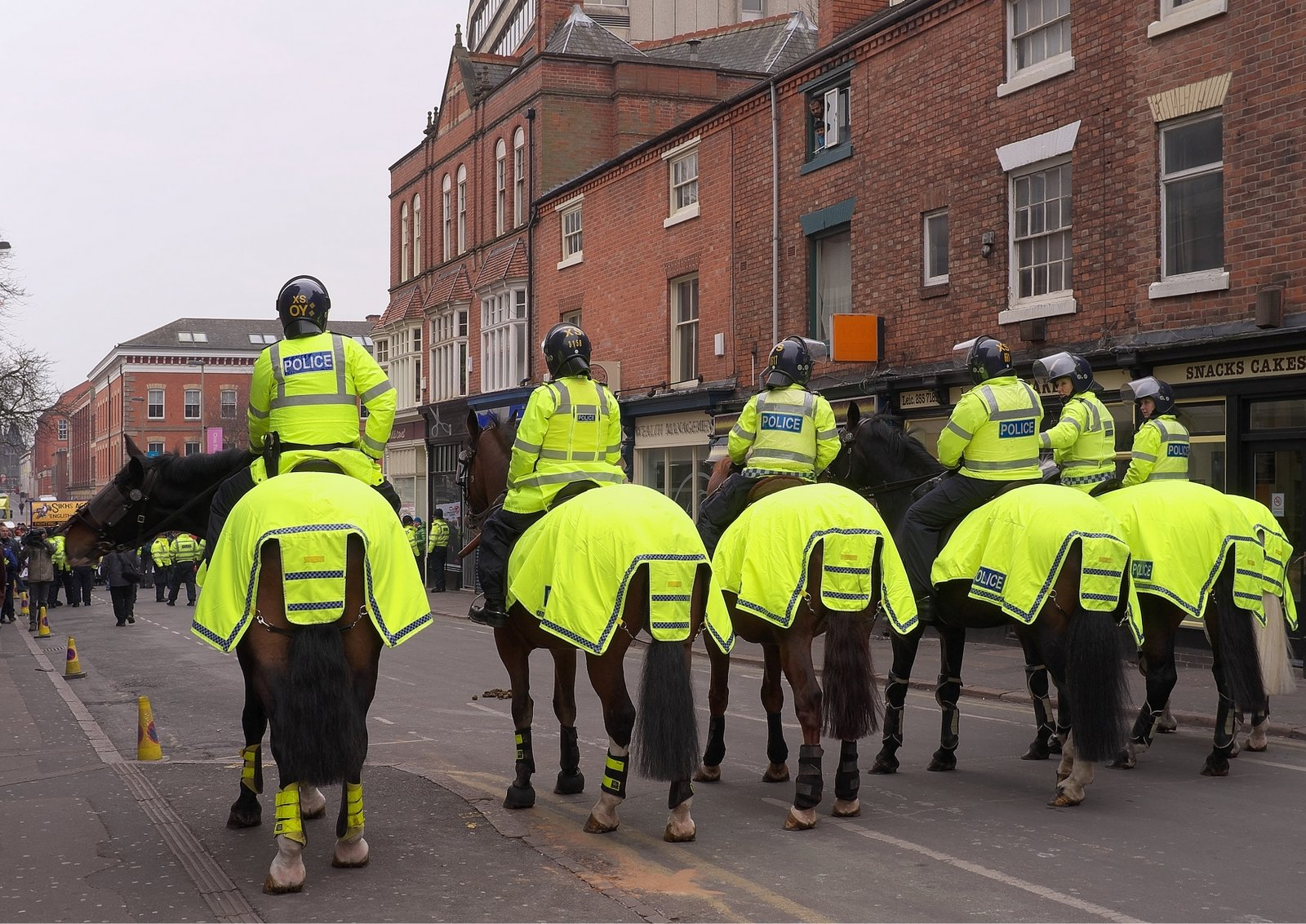
Mounted police wear high visibility wear for officers and their horses

Riders should wear high-visibility clothing to make themselves more visible to high speed motor traffic—fluorescent colors for daytime, and reflective strips for night time visibility. Horses should also be outfitted with hi-vis, which might include a fluorescent cloth on the rear and reflective strips around the legs or tail.

Slow moving vehicle emblem

In the United States and Canada, regulations require that all vehicles on roadways that cannot reach a speed of 25 mph or 40 kph must display a slow moving vehicle sign. This includes horse drawn vehicles. There are a few exceptions made for religious beliefs that prohibit bright colors, and in some cases white-and-gray reflector schemes are permitted instead of the usual red-and-orange.

Carriages and buggies on the streets at night should have reflectors and lights to avoid being struck from behind. It is recommended that frequent users of the road during night hours, such as Amish buggies, should add battery-operated flashing lights (red to the rear, and white strobe lights on top of buggies), and reflective leg and neck wraps for their horses. In hilly areas where roads undulate, adding a tall bicycle flag is a good idea.

Riding or driving a horse on the roads is best done during daylight and in fair weather to avoid low visibility conditions.

=== Protective equipment ===
When riding over hard surfaces, such as streets, riders should wear a helmet and a body protector vest or even an air bag vest to reduce injuries during a fall. In some cases, horses should wear leg protection. In icy conditions, horse shoes might be fitted with studs or caulkins.

=== Riding or driving on the road ===
If a horse is unfamiliar with riding on roads, avoiding roads altogether is a safe practice. Horses can be spooked fairly easily, and to minimize horses becoming panicked during a ride, avoiding a busy roadway is a good safety precaution to take. However, if it is necessary to ride on the roadway or cross a roadway, having a more experienced company can be helpful. Riding single file, as well as crossing major roadways in a group increases visibility for oncoming motorists. Although horses are rather large animals, from a far distance it is easier to see a number of horses rather than just one.

Riders should walk rather than go in a faster gait on roadways that are hard and smooth, such as asphalt. Higher speeds lead to a greater risk of the horse slipping or falling with the rider.

== Motorists ==
A horse travelling on the road is probably going about 5 to 8 miles per hour (8–13 kph), not much faster than a pedestrian. Motorists encountering horses on the roadway should immediately slow down. A car traveling 55 mph (88 kph) can close a 500-foot (150-metre) gap on a horse in just 6.5 seconds. Riders and drivers may not see motor vehicles behind them, and they may be unable to move out of the way due to deep ditches or other edge-of-road hazards. Motorists should not blow their horn anywhere near a horse. Horses are prey animals that may spook at sounds or strange sights and might jump towards traffic, so when passing a horse, motorists should do so slowly and leave a wide berth around the horse. A collision with a horse can have serious consequences to the motor vehicle, its occupants, as well as the horse and rider or carriage.

== Laws ==
As a rule of thumb, around the world riders are generally allowed where pedestrians are permitted, and carriages are allowed wherever wheeled slow moving vehicles are permitted. Riders and drivers are generally not permitted on limited-access roads where motor traffic is expected to be travelling very fast. Carriages are treated as "vehicles" and should travel in the same direction as motor traffic, but at the far edge of the road due to their slow speeds.

The state of New York has regulations for the use of horses on the road—both being ridden upon and being horse-driven vehicles. Some regulations only allow passing the horse-driven vehicle or horseback rider when it is safe to do so and prohibiting the use of any form of noise, such as a horn.

Reflectors at the rear of a horse-drawn vehicle must be visible from 500 feet when illuminated by the lower beams of headlamps of a motor vehicle.

== Mitigation efforts by government ==
Ohio's Amish population is the largest in the world. In 2000, Ohio published the findings of a comprehensive study of the issue of buggy-vehicle crashes. Interviewing the Amish communities, motor vehicle drivers, and other stakeholders, they came up with a series of recommendations to help reduce crashes. Among the recommendations were: widen road shoulders to 8 feet (especially after the cresting of a hill), add pull-off lanes for buggies to allow vehicles to pass, construct separate buggy trails, increase bus service to Amish communities, set a minimum age for buggy operators, develop driver education courses for Amish buggy drivers (in cooperation with the Amish School Board), add buggy awareness to the youth motor driving curriculum, and run public information campaigns to address sharing the roadway. Another concern was identification of victims in a crash (buggy operator and passengers), as Amish don't routinely carry government issued identification and their vehicles don't carry license plates. Ohio and the Amish communities were reportedly working on solving that.

Ohio also proposed an Amish Buggy Warning Detection System in 2000. The system would mount flashing lights on road signs warning motorists to be aware of a buggy ahead. The lights would be set off by the passing of a buggy containing a non-electric pod which would trip the detectors, and the lights would stop flashing after a predetermined time.

== See also ==
- Bridle path
- Pedestrian crossing
- Trails
