= Tilbury (carriage) =

Two-wheeled horse-drawn vehicle

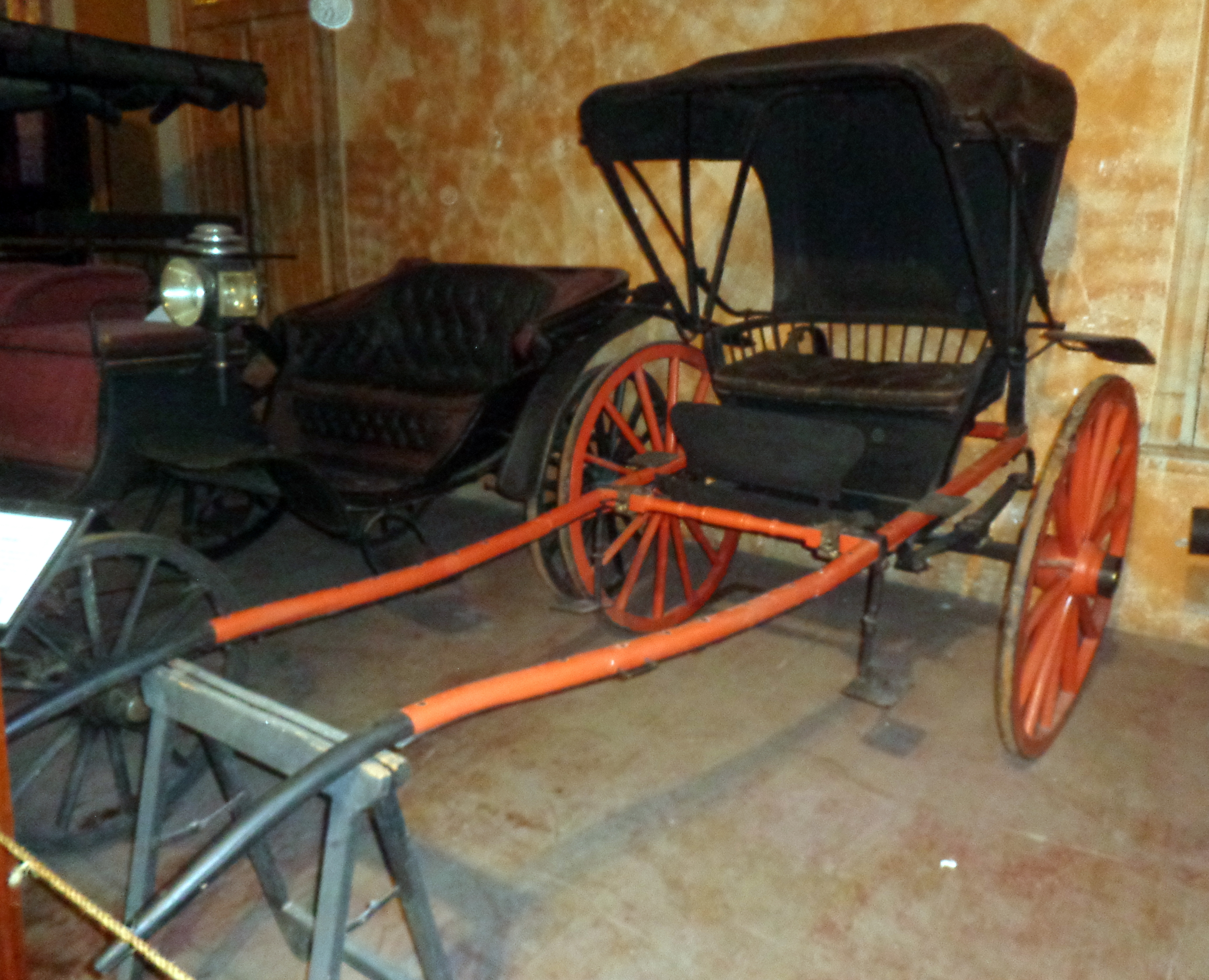
A Tilbury gig in an Argentinian museum

A Tilbury or seven-spring gig is a light, fast, two-wheeled sporting carriage developed by the London coachbuilder Tilbury in the early 19th century. Known for its seven-spring suspension and characteristic spindle-backed seat, it was designed for speed over rough roads.

== Design ==
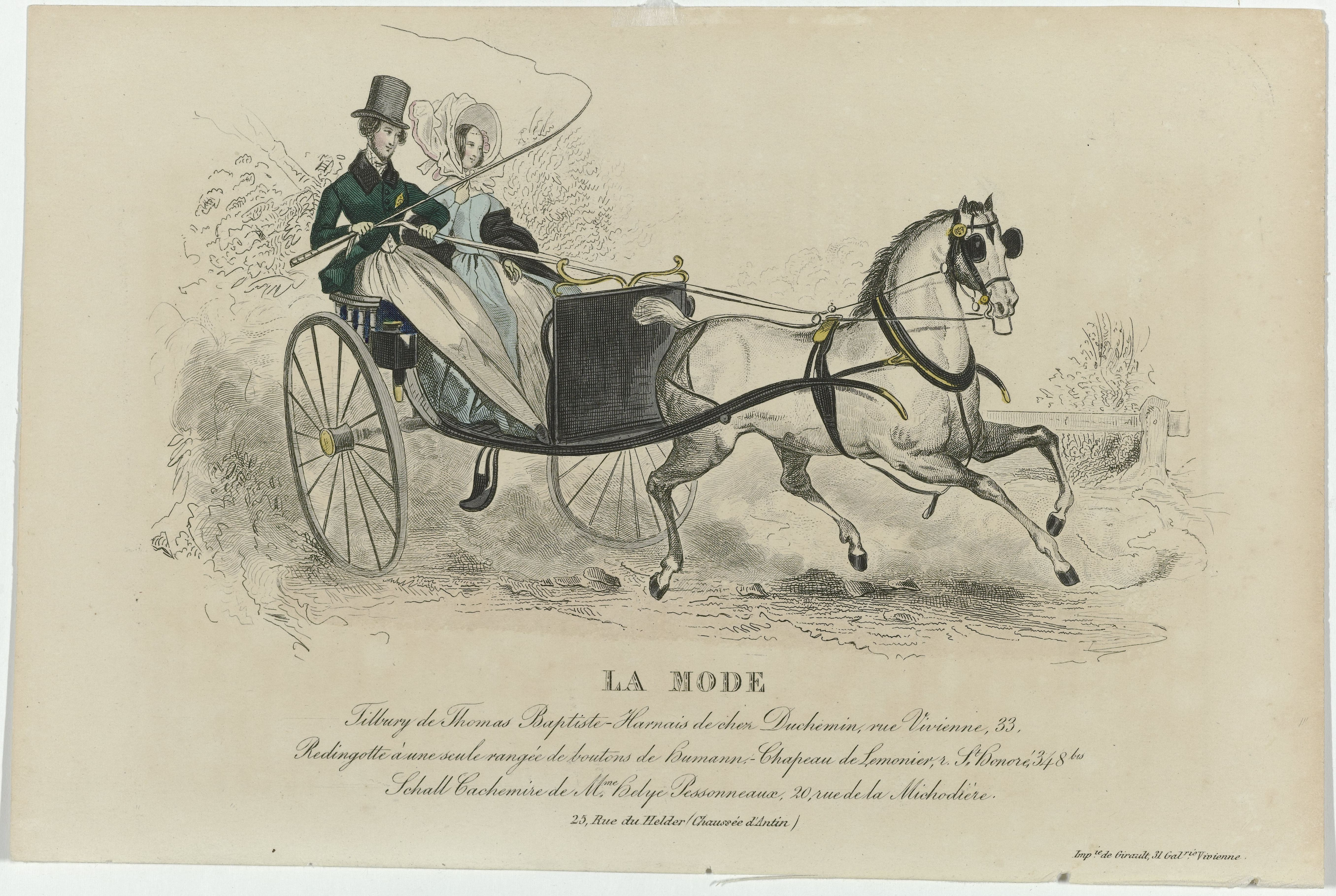
This fashion print, circa 1837, shows the traditional bucket-shaped step and gently curving shafts.

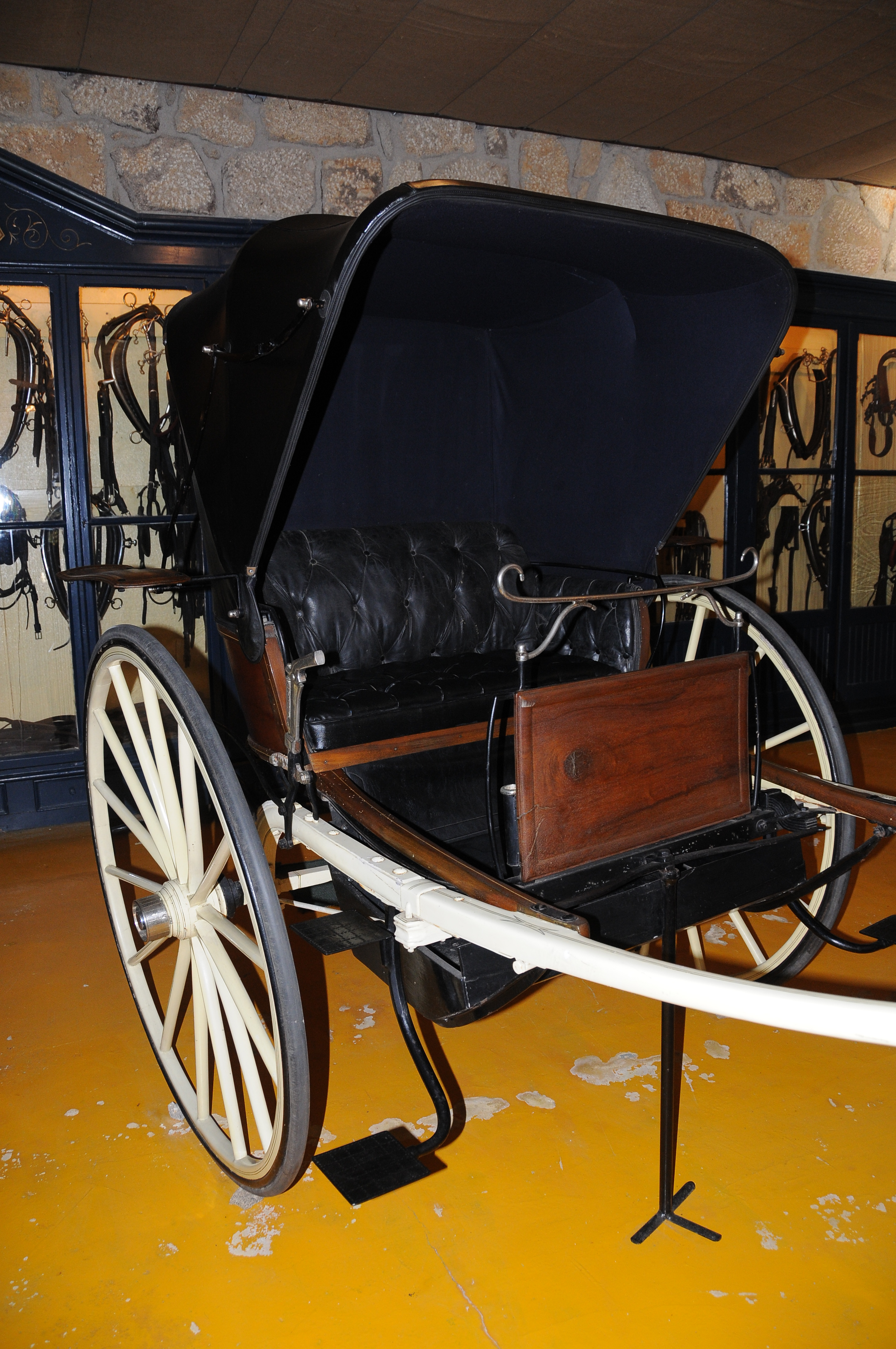
In a Portugal museum

The Tilbury is a two-wheeled carriage of the gig class, named for its builder Tilbury of London. It has a single crosswise seat which accommodates a driver and one passenger. The seat is usually a spindle-back seat style, called a Tilbury seat, which is also seen on other gigs including the Stanhope, Dennett, and Skeleton. The Tilbury has a drop-box under the seat, rather than a boot giving it a lighter silhouette than the heavier look of the booted Stanhope. Most Tilbury gigs have a falling hood of leather supported by wooden hoops. Traditionally there is a bucket-shaped metal step hanging from the shaft with which to enter the carriage. The shafts are gently curving.

The Tilbury is designed with a double suspension consisting of seven metal springs, giving rise to the name seven-spring gig. The spring system, called Tilbury springs, adds considerable weight to the vehicle, but makes the ride more comfortable. The shafts and some of the body are also iron-plated.

Modern Tilbury gigs are manufactured using modern components such as elliptical springs seen on most modern carriages. A modern Tilbury would be designed with a falling hood, often spindle-backed seats, a narrowing body below the seat, plain flat steps hung from the shafts, and a dashboard of solid wood or leatherette on an iron frame.

=== Tilbury springs ===
The seven-spring design became known as "Tilbury springs". According to Sallie Walrond:

It was hung on seven springs and for this reason was known as Tilbury springs. It consisted of an elbow spring going from the underneath of each side of the front of the body to the shafts, two side-springs between the axle and the shafts and an elbow spring secured to each side of the seat. These were joined to the ends of a cross-spring which was secured by iron stays from a read cross-bar.

=== Tilbury tugs ===
Tilbury tugs, also known as French tugs, are a part of harness. Tugs are loops which hold the shafts at a height to make the vehicle level. Typical tugs are open loops which allow some up and down play of the shafts. Tilbury tugs wrap around the shaft and secure it tightly so there is no movement of the shafts, other than following the motion of the horse.

== Variations ==
- Dutch Tilbury: A more ornate version, often with a rearward compartment for luggage, and straighter shafts.
- Dennett gig: A later, three-spring variation of the Stanhope and Tilbury.
- Spider Phaeton: An American phaeton, essentially a Tilbury body mounted on four wheels.

== Historical context ==
The Tilbury was invented around 1820 and built by Tilbury, coachbuilders in London. It went out of fashion in England by 1850, however it remained popular in North America until late in the 1800s. It was designed by Fitzroy Stanhope who earlier designed the lighter four-spring Stanhope gig.
