= Gig (carriage) =

Two-wheeled carriage

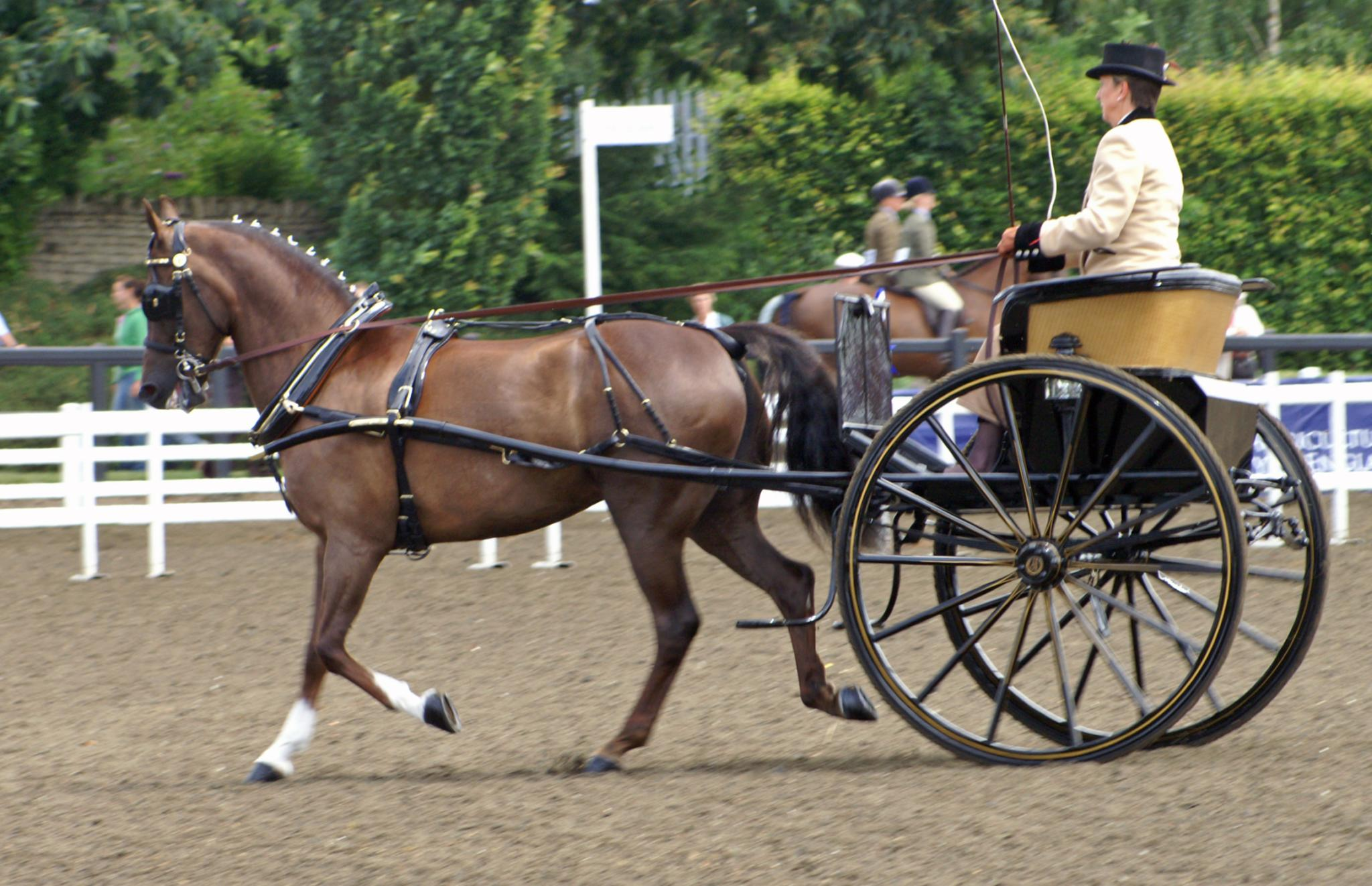
A modern gig

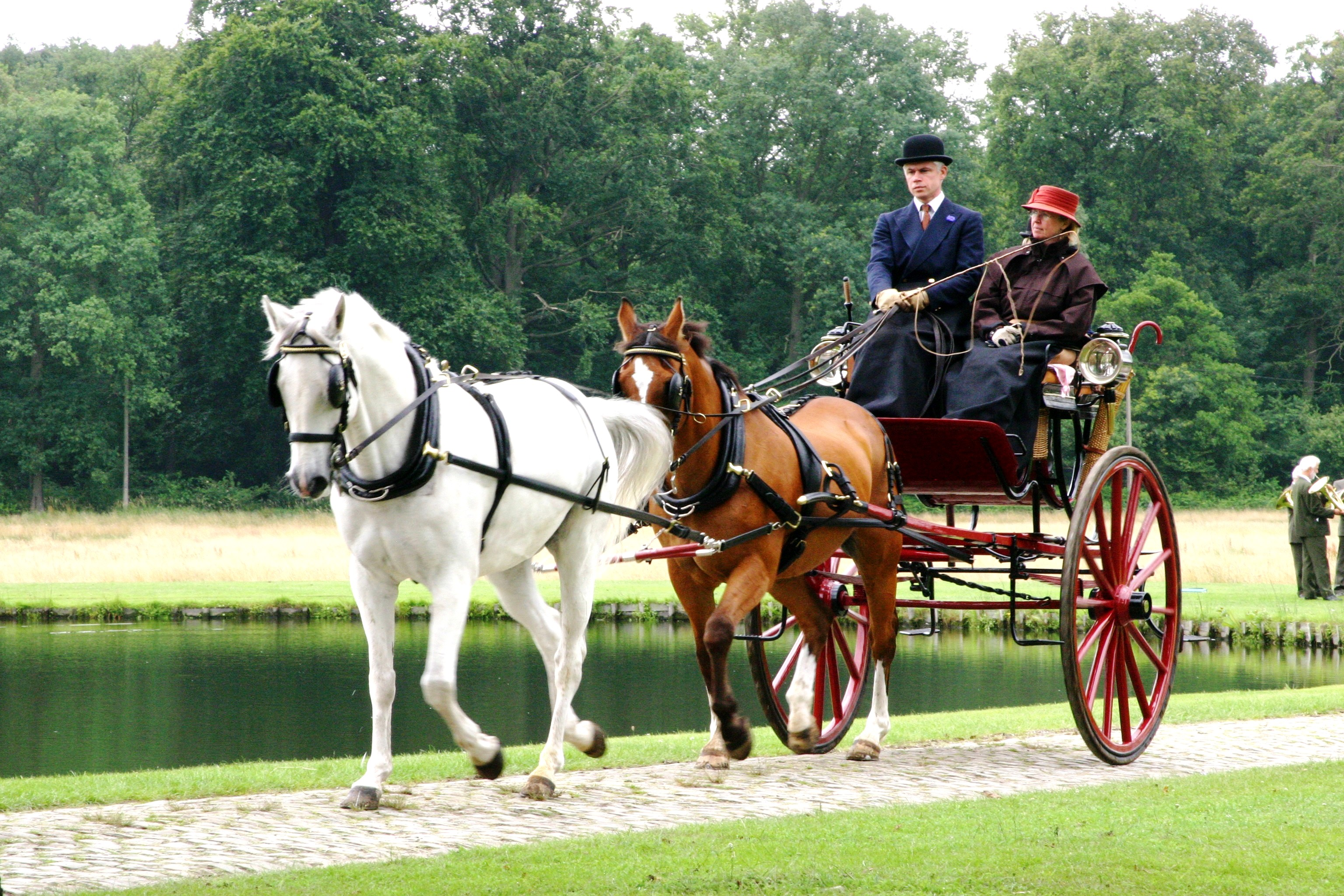
Skeleton gig being driven tandem

A gig is a light, two-wheeled open carriage with large wheels, a forward facing seat, and shafts for a single horse. The gig's body is constructed above the shafts, and it is entered from step-irons hanging from the shaft in front of the wheels. Gigs are enclosed at the back, and have luggage space under the cross-seat. Early gigs were crude and unsprung; later gigs were elegant for town driving and were constructed with springs. The term "gig" is short for "whirligig".

The Oxford English Dictionary gives the date of first known reference to a horse-drawn gig as 1791, and they were ubiquitous by the early 1800s.

Gigs were typically named after their designers, builders, or their shape. There are several types of gig, including:

- Dennett gig: Early 1800s resembling the Stanhope gig but with three springs, one crosswise and two horizontal
- Skeleton gig: Very light; no luggage space.
- Spider gig: Very high gig, French version had high outward curving dash and curved shafts.
- Stanhope: typically having a high seat and closed back; designed and built by Fitzroy Stanhope around 1814.
- Stick-back gig: designed with the seat back made of sticks or ribs.
- Suicide gig: Very high gig popular in Ireland. Dangerous to drive or mount.
- Tilbury or Seven-spring gig: designed by Fitzroy Stanhope, but named after builder Tilbury. Heavier than the Stanhope because it had seven springs and two braces. Popular where roads were rough.
- Whiskey or whisky: lightweight, often constructed with canework. Named for whisking over the road.

Gigs travelling at night would normally carry two oil lamps with thick glass, known as gig-lamps. This led to the formerly common slang word "giglamps" for "spectacles".

Nineteenth century literature frequently recounted "romantic tales of spills and hairbreadth [e]scapes" from these vehicles, but is equally fulsome on the fearful thrill experienced in driving them.

== See also ==
- Horse-drawn vehicle
- History of horse-drawn transport
