= Phaeton (carriage) =

Four wheeled open carriage

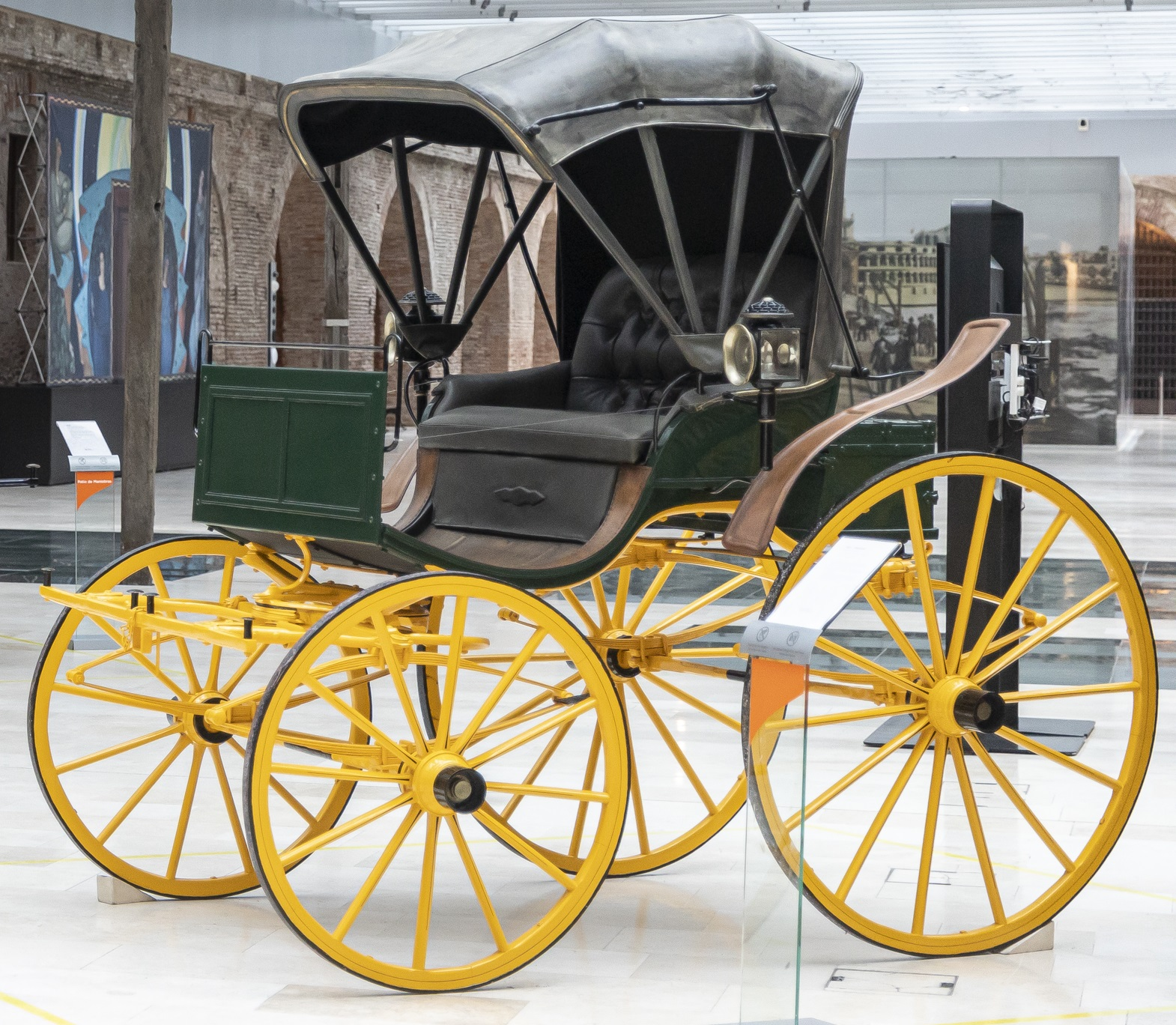
Phaeton in Argentina, built circa 1890

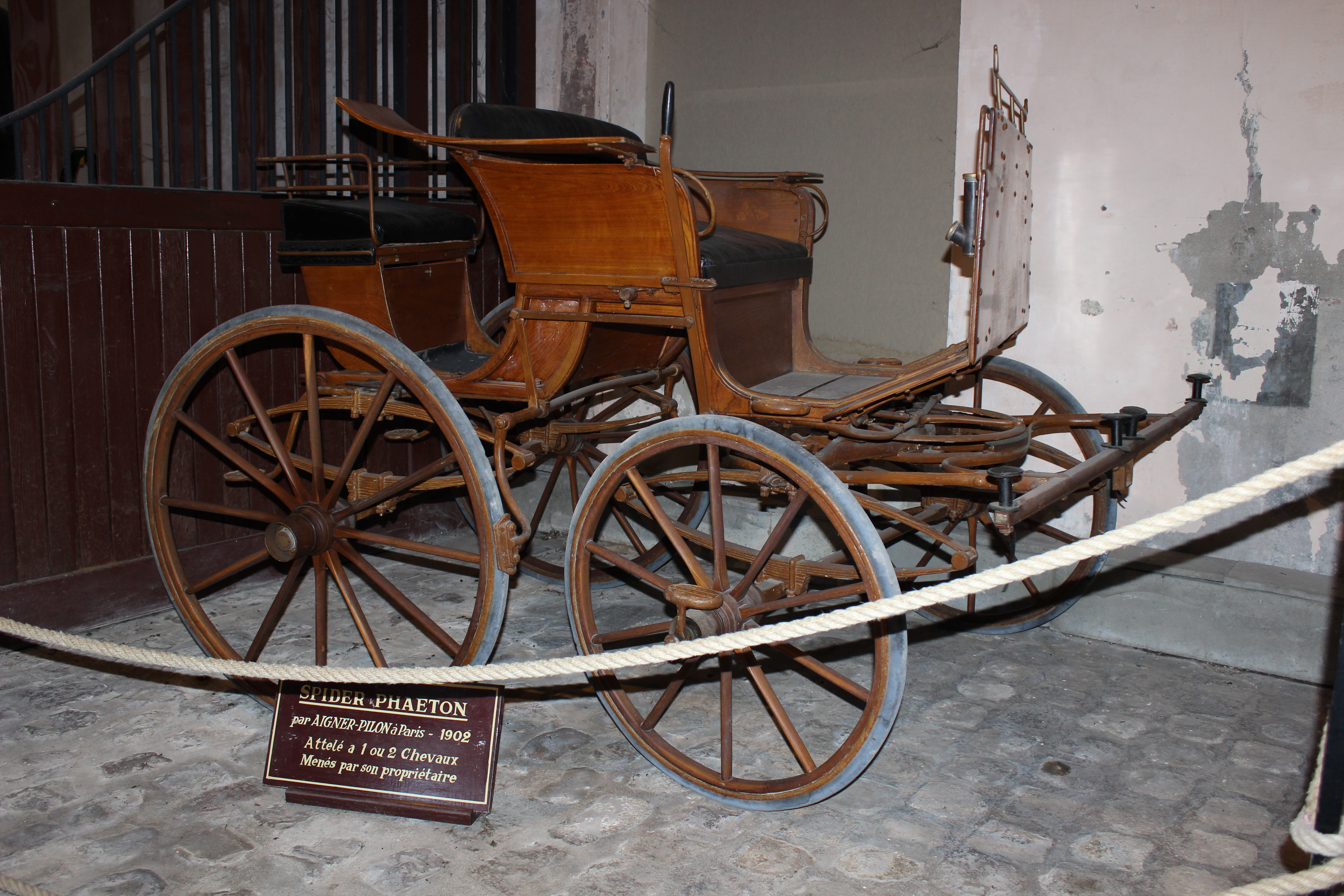
A phaeton in France

A phaeton is a sporty open carriage popular in the late eighteenth and early nineteenth century. Drawn by one or two horses, a phaeton typically features a minimal very lightly sprung body atop four extravagantly large wheels.

== Design and variations ==
A phaeton is not a single standardized carriage design but a broad category of light, owner-driven, open four-wheeled carriages. The term is applied to many different sporting carriages that share only general characteristics—open, large wheels, lightweight, no coachman's seat—while varying widely in size, number of horses, and style. Because the name was used so loosely, "phaeton" is most meaningful when referring to specific types.

The earliest phaetons accommodated only two people and did not have a separate coachman's seat, making them lighter than other four-wheeled carriages at the time. This contributed to their popularity, and use as sport and pleasure vehicles. Often it had a folding top to cover the passengers.

The Highflyer Phaeton is another early vehicle class from the late 1700s. They are also called perch-high phaetons and high-perch phaetons. The highflyers have very large wheels, up to 6 feet tall in the rear and smaller in the front. The carriage body is mounted high in the air on a variety of springs, with the body over the front axle, and luggage boots mounted over the axles. The high center of gravity and the forward position of the driving seat makes the high flyer precariously dangerous.

The Crane-Neck Phaeton is a variation of the highflyers with a crane-neck perch allowing the front wheels to turn more sharply.

The Mail Phaeton has a large box-shaped body with a falling hood over the front driver's seat, and a seat in the rear for a groom. It is a heavy vehicle pulled by two or more horses. It was so named because it used the "mail springs" invented for the mail coaches.

The Demi-Mail Phaeton was similar to, but lighter than, the Mail Phaeton.

The Spider Phaeton is an American vehicle of the 1860s. It is basically a Tilbury body on four wheels with a skeleton seat in the rear for a groom. It was considered one of the more elegant vehicles and appropriate for horse shows.

George IV Phaetons derived from a pony phaeton mounted very low and with small wheels, that was requested by the aging George IV for easier access.

Other principal types include pony phaetons, popular with women drivers; park phaetons for park driving; gentlemen's phaetons with angular features, ladies' phaetons with more curved styling; and basket phaetons built of wicker and very lightweight.

Types of phaetons

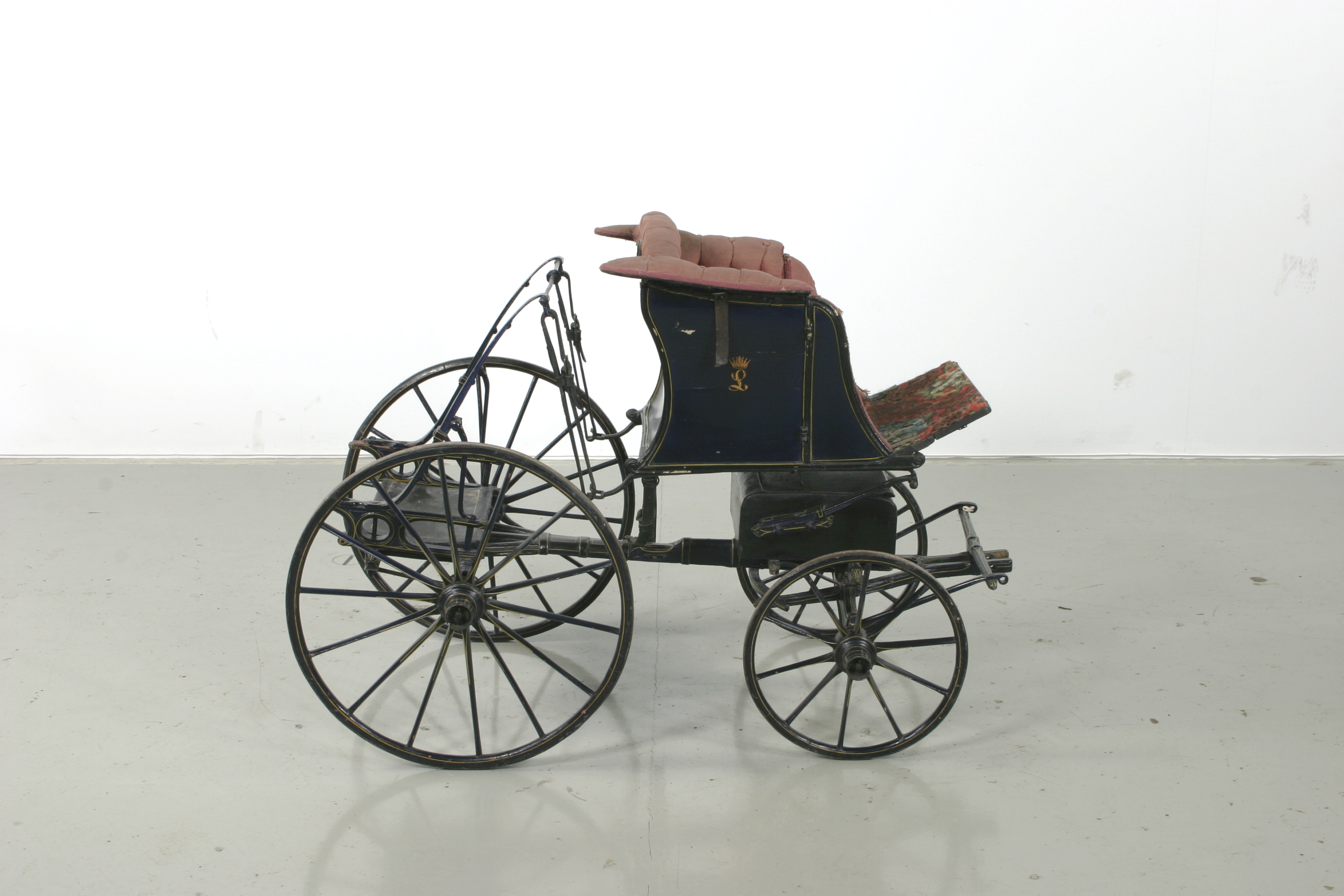
Highflyer phaeton (model)

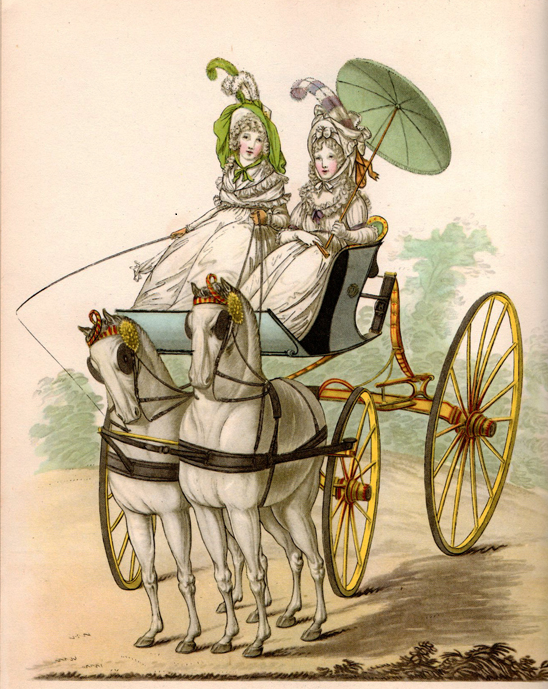
Highflyer phaeton

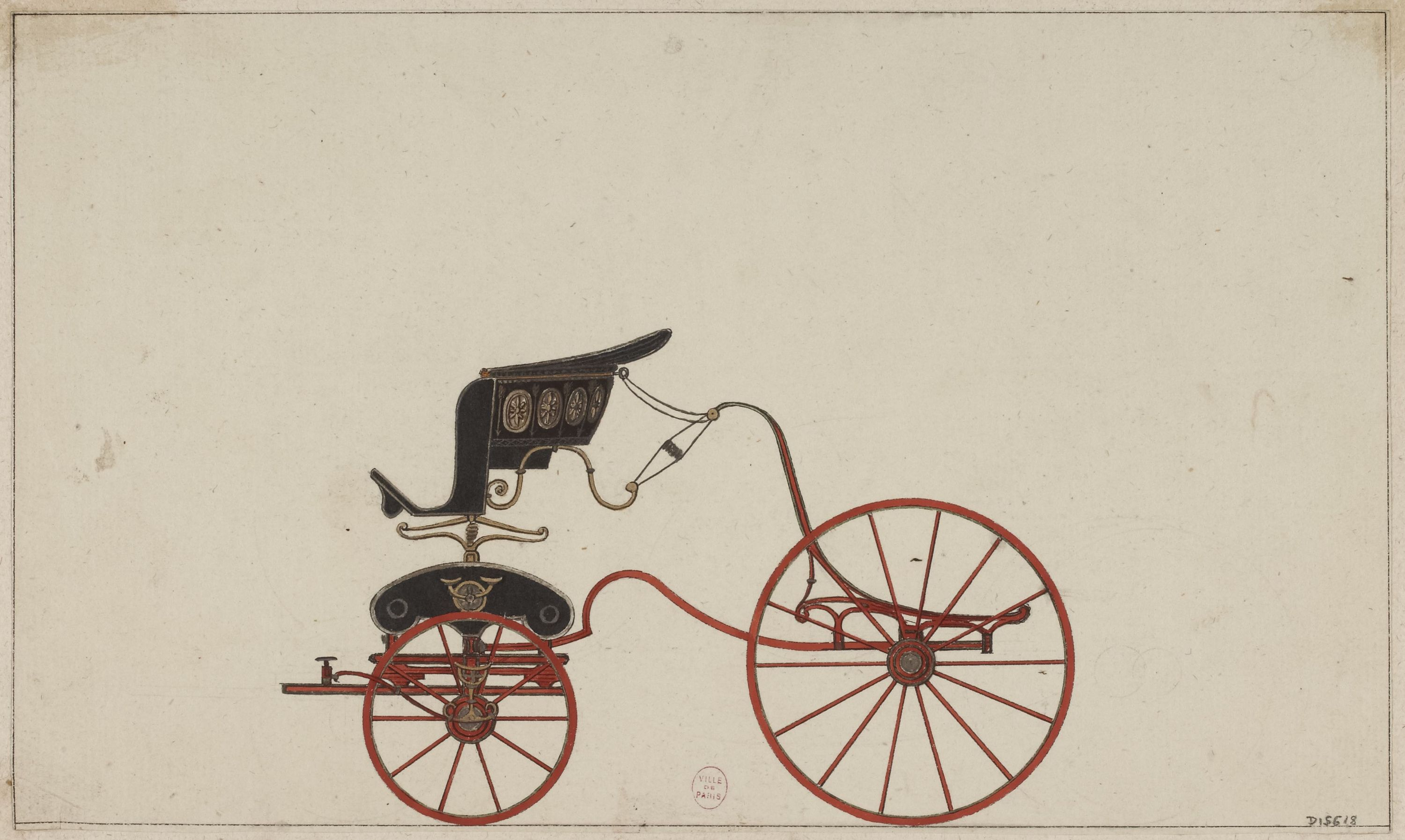
Crane-neck phaeton

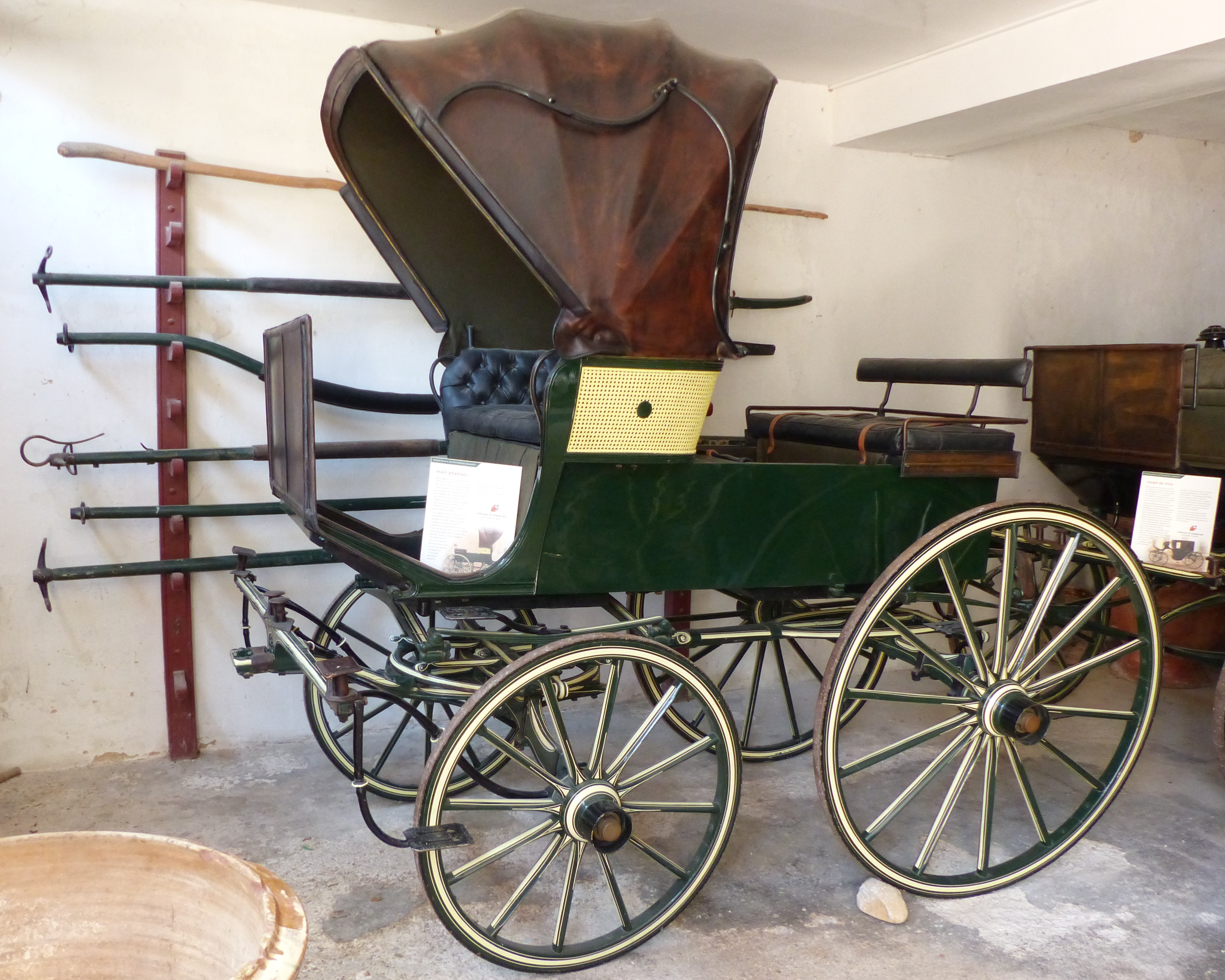
Mail phaeton

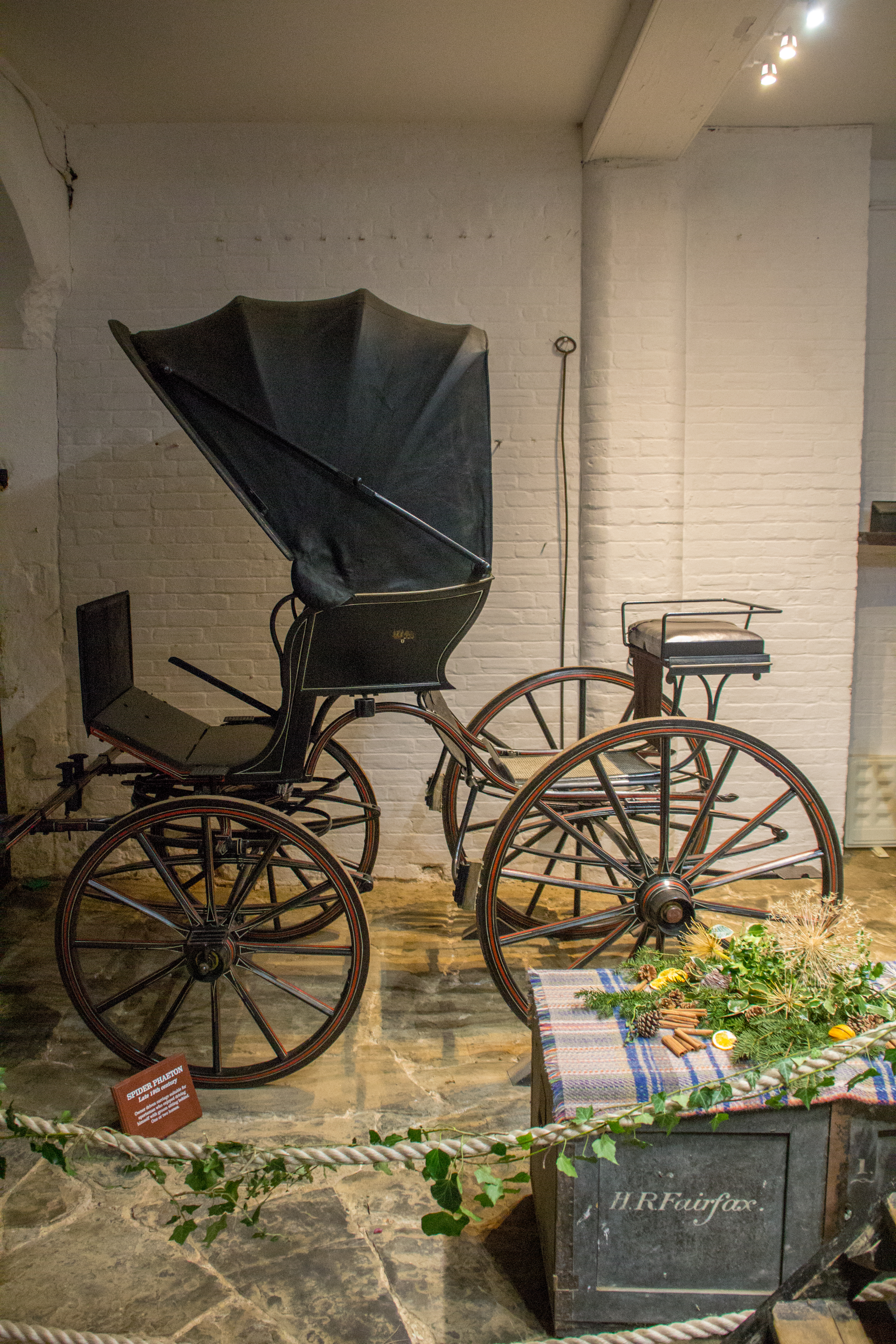
Spider phaeton

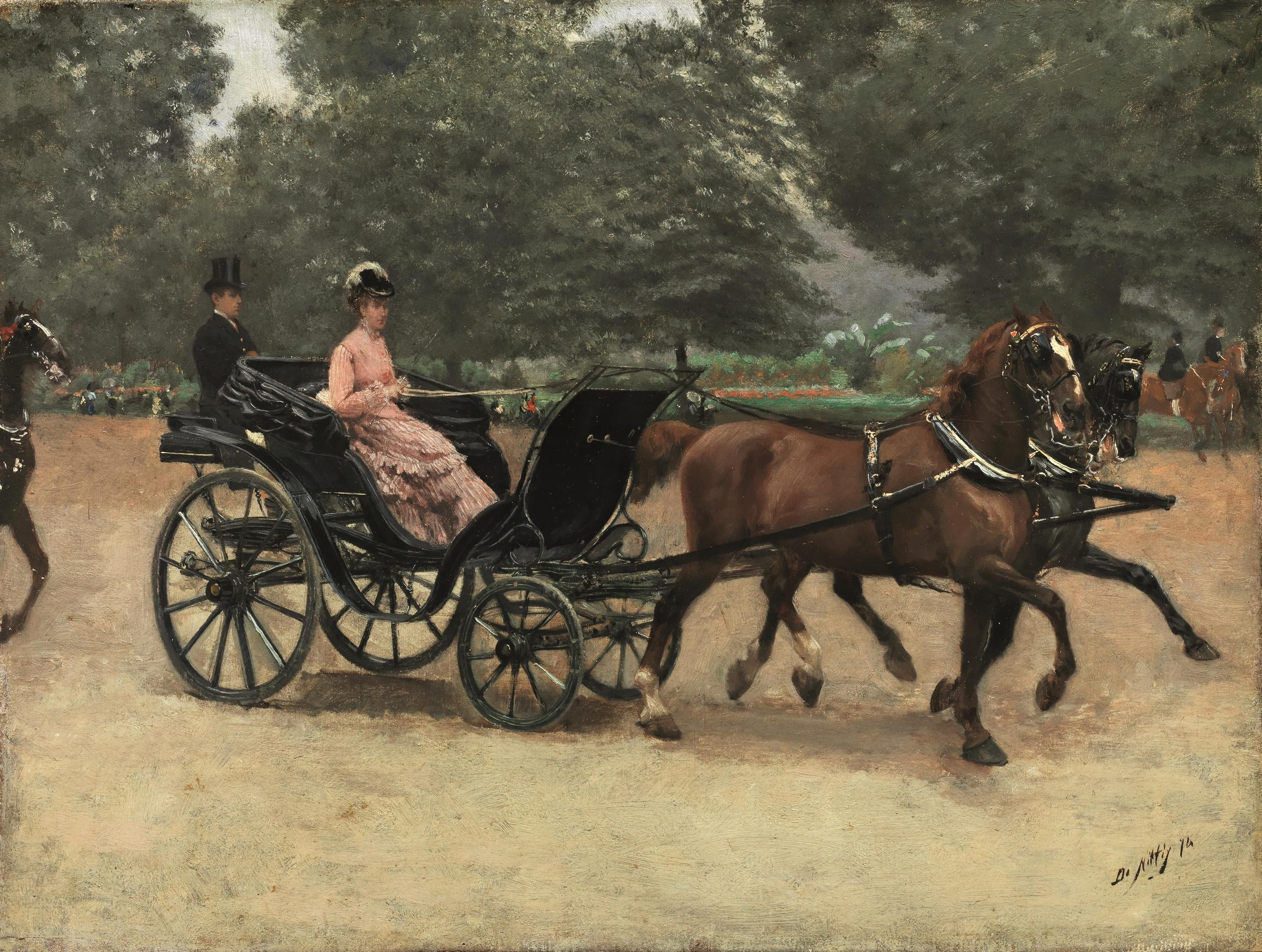
Ladies park phaeton

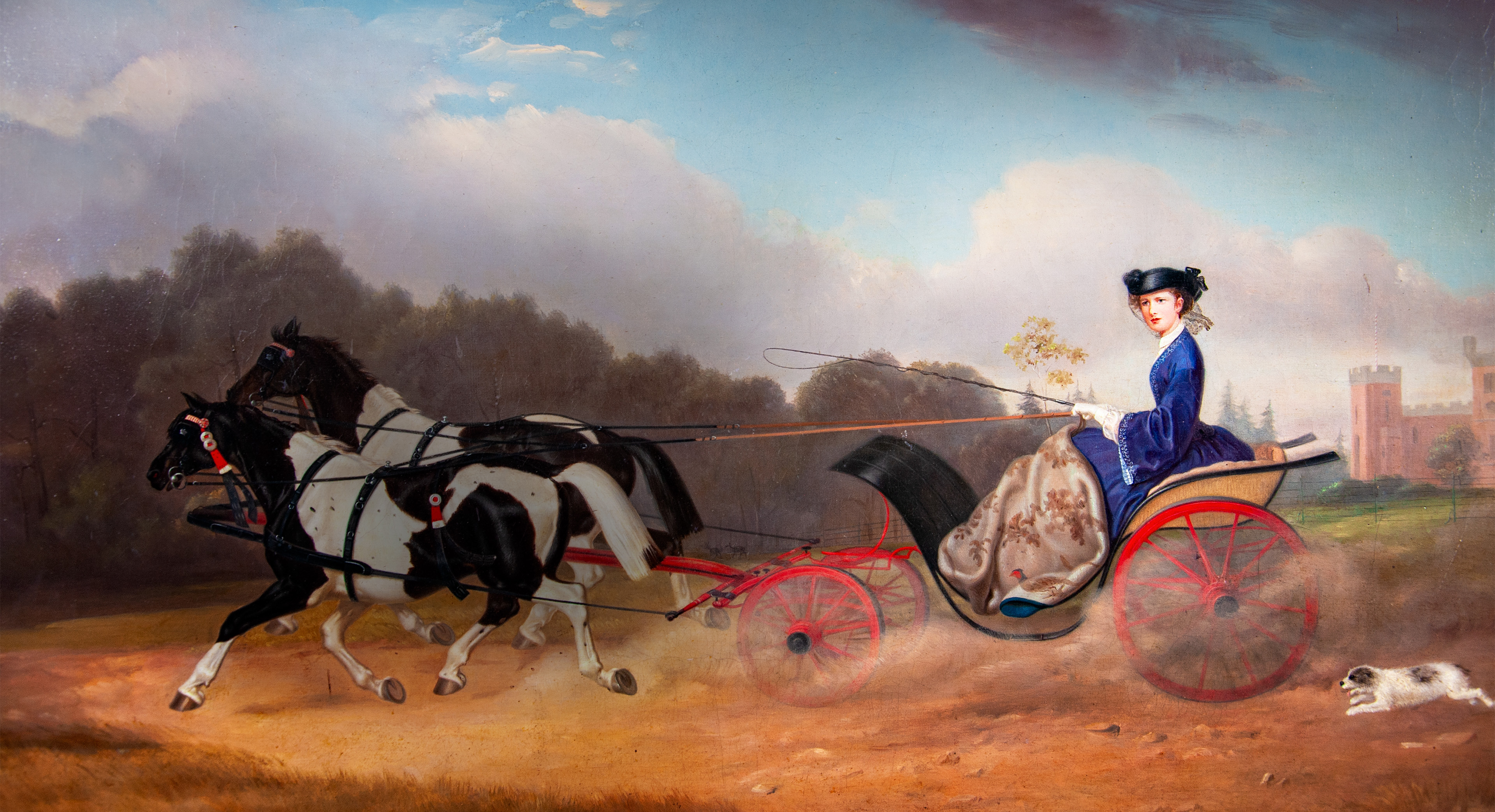
Pony phaeton

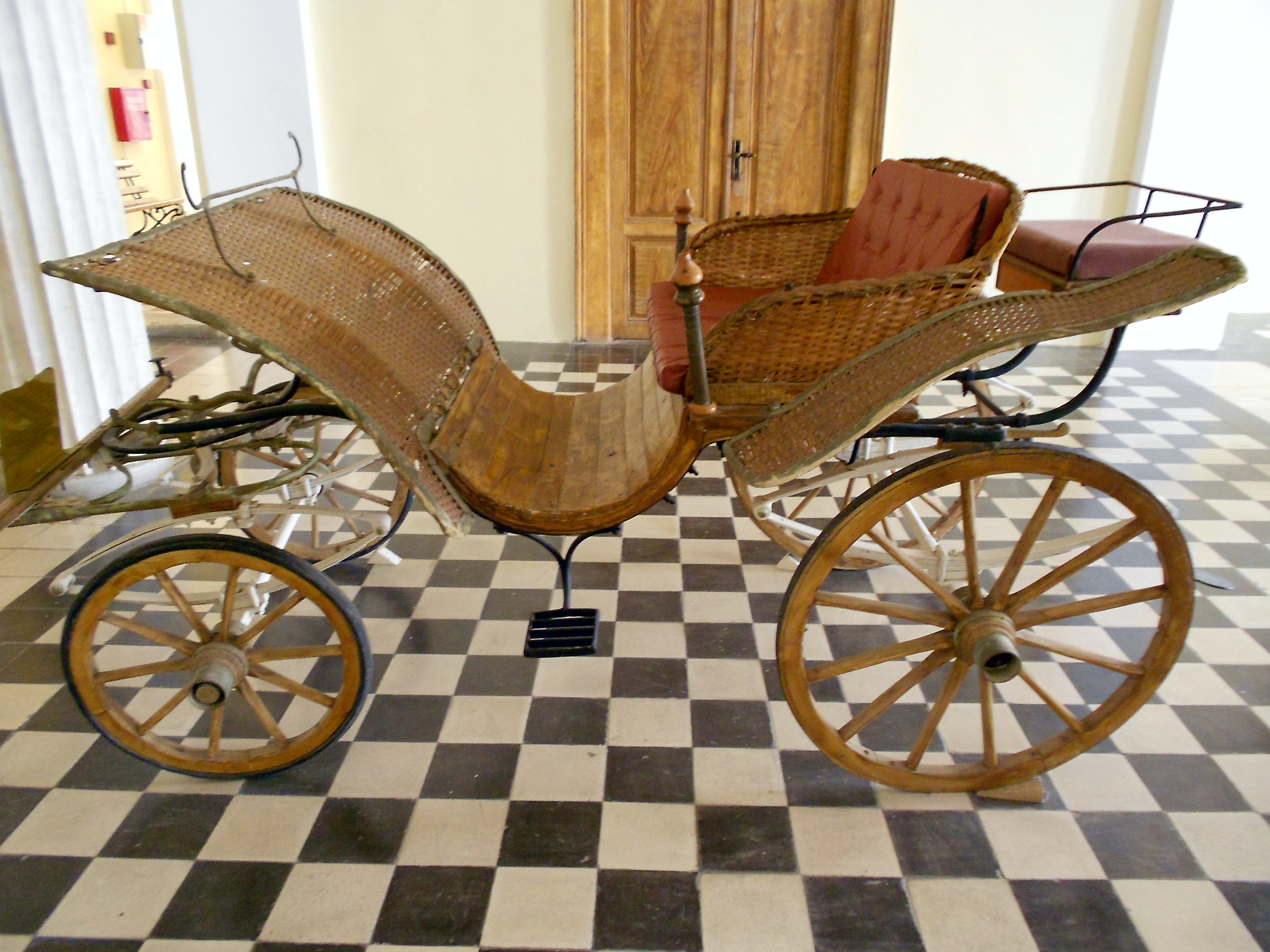
Basket phaeton

== Historical context ==
The name phaeton was first applied to the carriage in France during the 18th century fashion for classical pseudonyms. Berkebile notes that the earliest known reference appears in 1735, and that the term spread to England by 1747 and to America by the 1760s. The vehicle itself predated the name—earlier forms were known as four-wheel chaises, or in France as four-wheel cabriolets. The mythological association comes from "Phaethon, son of Helios... who drove the chariot of the sun with such recklessness that Zeus struck him down", a reputation that later colored the carriage's image as a fast and sometimes precarious sporting vehicle. According to Gilbey, "phaeton" appears in a patent from 1788.

One of the earlier phaetons for the British monarchy was the George IV Phaeton, a small and low pony carriage with small wheels built in 1824 to allow the portly and lame King George IV to enter and exit. A similar pony phaeton was built for Queen Victoria in 1851, and others followed, leading to the modification of adding an iron-framed coachman's seat over the dash and naming that carriage design a Victoria.

With the advent of the automobile, the term phaeton was adopted to refer to open touring cars, which are referred to as a phaeton body.

== Modern use ==
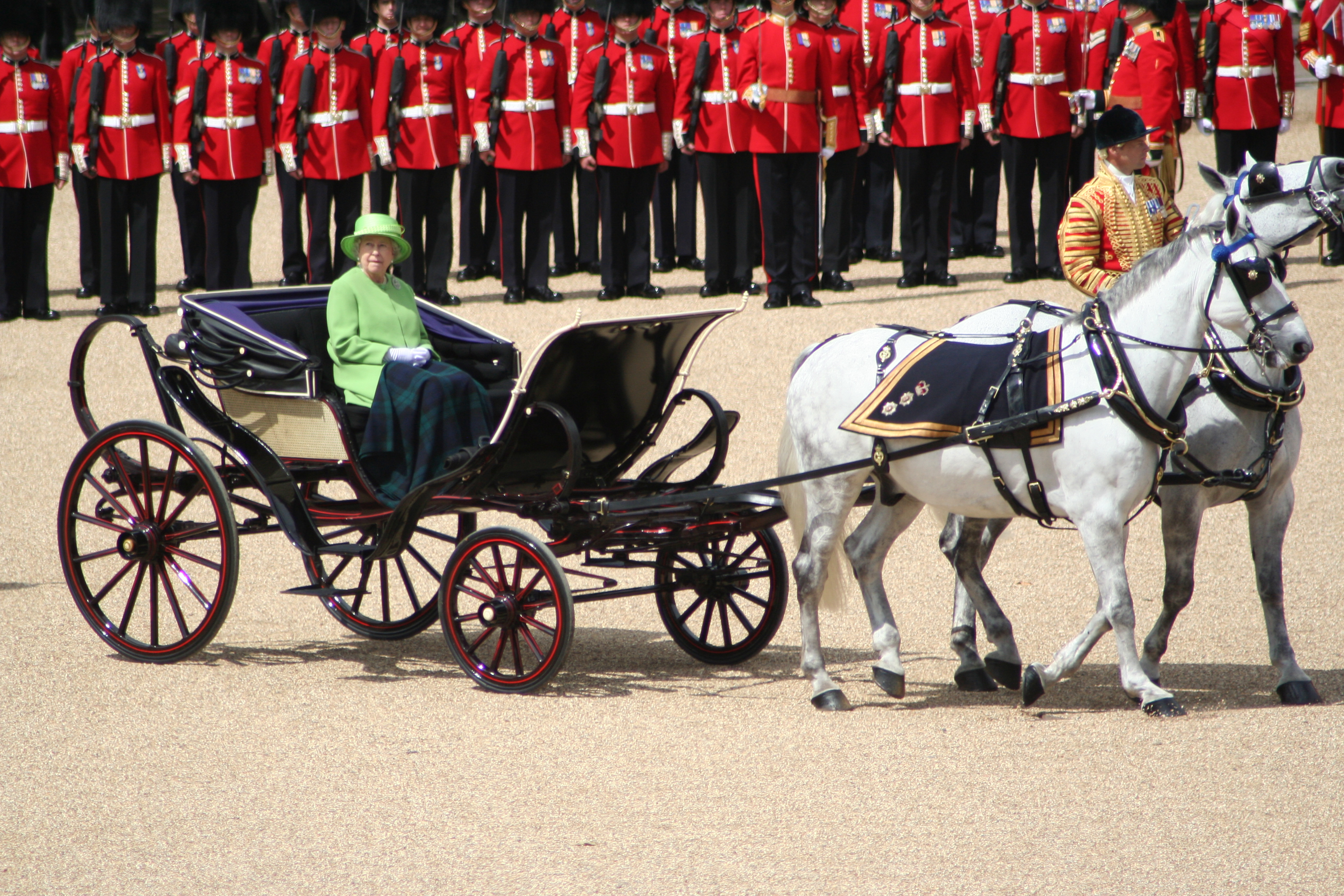
The Ivory Mounted Phaeton, 2007

The Ivory Mounted Phaeton was built in 1842 for Queen Victoria by Barker and Company, and renovated in 1961. It has ivory fittings and is in the Royal Mews carriage collection. It was used by Queen Elizabeth II from 1978 to 2011 during the official Queen's Birthday celebrations, when she travelled to and from Trooping the Colour.

== See also ==
- History of horse-drawn transport
- Bibliography of carriages and driving
