= Horses in the Middle Ages =

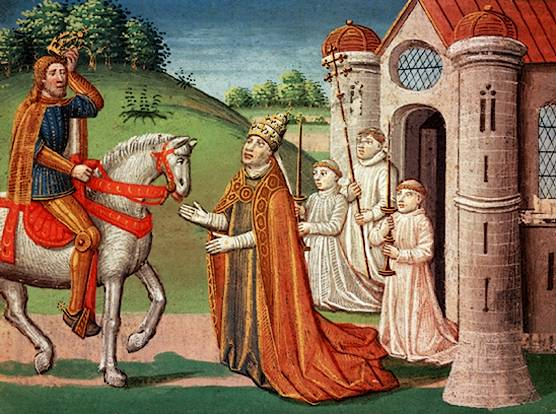
This 15th-century depiction of Charlemagne and Pope Adrian I shows a well-bred medieval horse with arched neck, refined head and elegant gait.

Horses in the Middle Ages differed in size, build and breed from the modern horse, and were, on average, smaller. They were also more central to society than their modern counterparts, being essential for war, agriculture, and transport.

Consequently, specific types of horse developed, many of which have no modern equivalent. While an understanding of modern horse breeds and equestrianism is vital for any analysis of the medieval horse, researchers also need to consider documentary (both written and pictorial) and archaeological evidence.

Horses in the Middle Ages were rarely differentiated by breed, but rather by use. This led them to be described, for example, as "chargers" (war horses), "palfreys" (riding horses), cart horses or packhorses. Reference is also given to their place of origin, such as "Spanish horses," but whether this referred to one breed or several is unknown. Another difficulty arising during any study of medieval documents or literature is the flexibility of the medieval languages, where several words can be used for one thing (or, conversely, several objects are referred to by one word). Words such as 'courser' and 'charger' are used interchangeably (even within one document), and where one epic may speak disparagingly of a rouncey, another praises its skill and swiftness.

Significant technological advances in equestrian equipment, often introduced from other cultures, allowed for significant changes in both warfare and agriculture. In particular, improved designs for the solid-treed saddle as well as the arrival of the stirrup, horseshoe and horse collar were significant advances in medieval society.

Consequently, the assumptions and theories developed by historians are not definitive, and debate still rages on many issues, such as the breeding or size of the horse, and a number of sources must be consulted in order to understand the breadth of the subject.

== Breeding ==
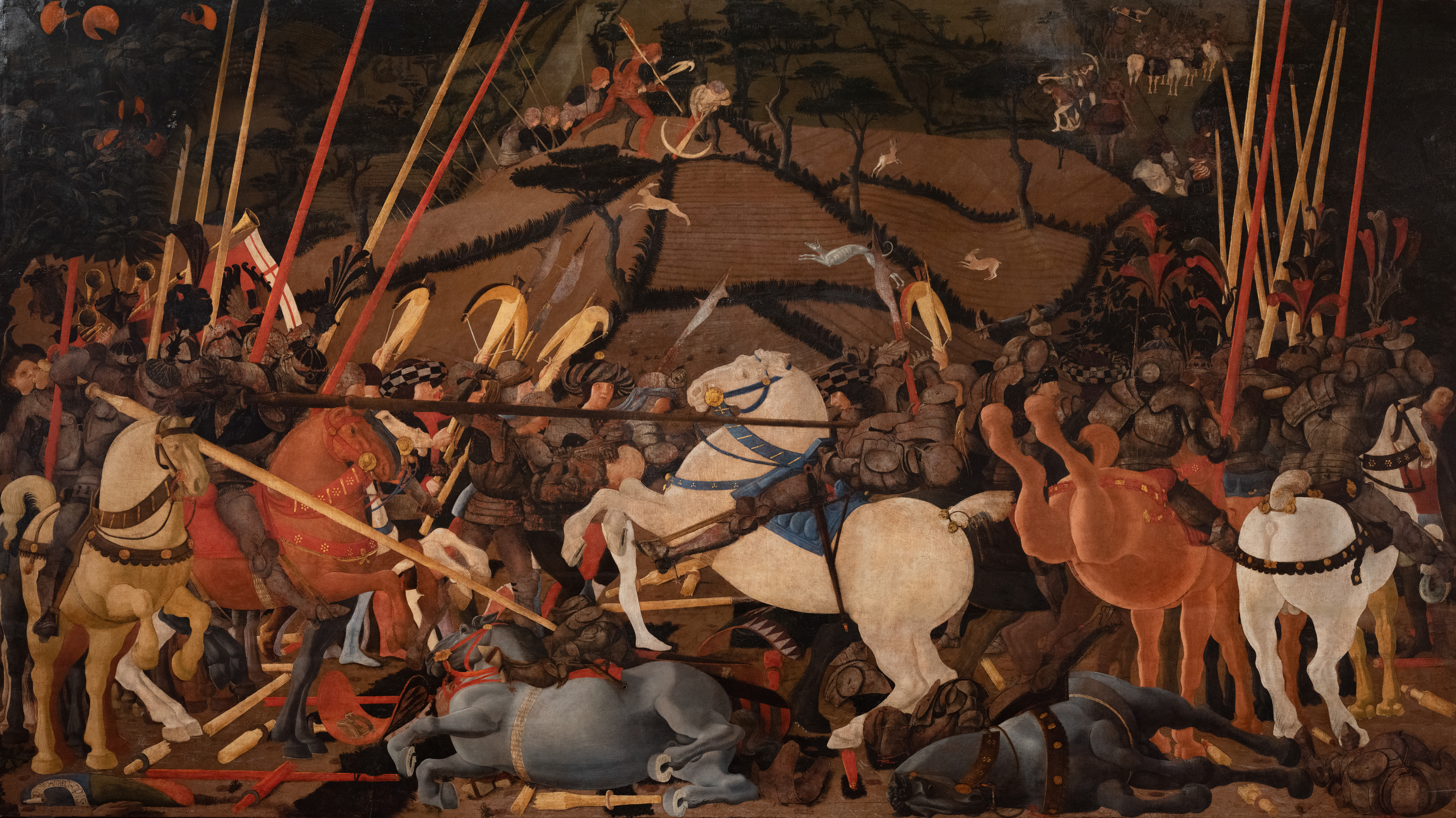
This 15th-century battle scene shows the powerfully built horses used in warfare. From The Battle of San Romano by Paolo Uccello.

During the Decline of the Roman Empire and the Early Middle Ages, much of the quality breeding stock developed during the classical period was lost due to uncontrolled breeding and had to be built up again over the following centuries. In the west, this may have been due in part to the reliance of the British and Scandinavians on infantry-based warfare, where horses were only used for riding and pursuit.

However, there were exceptions; in the 7th century a Merovingian kingdom still retained at least one active Roman horse-breeding centre. The Spanish also retained many quality horses, in part due to the historic reputation of the region as a horse-breeding land, and partially due to the cultural influences related to the Islamic conquest of the Iberian Peninsula between the 8th and 15th centuries.

The origins of the medieval war horse are obscure, although it is believed they had some Barb and Arabian blood through the Spanish Jennet, a forerunner to the modern Friesian and Andalusian horse. It is also possible that other sources of oriental bloodstock came from what was called the Nisaean breed (possibly akin to the Turkoman horse) from Iran and Anatolia, another type of oriental horse brought back from the Crusades. "Spanish" horses, whatever their breeding, were the most expensive. In fact, in Germany the word spanjol became the term for quality war horses. However, German literary sources also refer to fine horses from Scandinavia. France also produced good war horses. Some scholars attribute this to the strong Feudal society there, but an equally probable explanation is the historic influence of the Roman horse breeding traditions preserved by the Merovingians, combined with the addition of valuable Spanish and oriental bloodstock captured in the wake of the victory of Charles Martel over the Islamic Umayyad invaders at the Battle of Tours in 732. Following this battle, the Carolingians began to increase their heavy cavalry, which resulted in the seizure of land (for fodder production), and a change in tribute payment from cattle to horses.

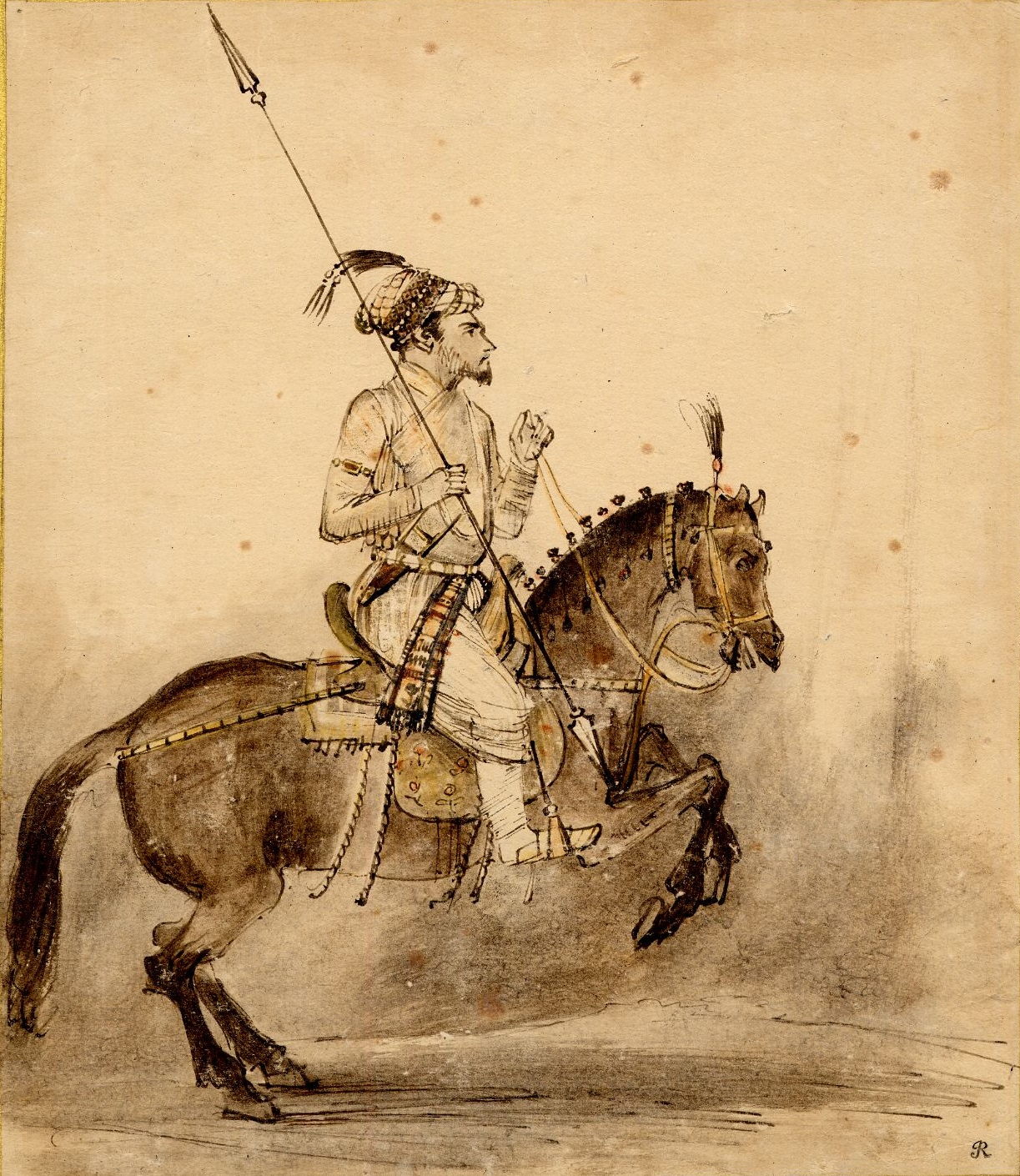
A Mughal nobleman (Sowar) on horseback.

As the importance of horse breeding to successful warfare was realized, planned breeding programs increased. Many changes were due to the influence of Islamic culture through both the Crusades and the Moorish invasions of Spain; the Arabs kept extensive pedigrees of their Barb and Arabian horses via an oral tradition. Some of the earliest written pedigrees in recorded European history were kept by Carthusian monks, who were among those who bred the Spanish Jennet. Because they could read and write, thus kept careful records, monastics were given the responsibility for horse breeding by certain members of the nobility, particularly in Spain. In England, a common source of warhorses were the wild moorland ponies, which were rounded up annually by horse-breeders, including the Cistercians, for use as campaign riding horses, or light cavalry; one such breed was the Fell pony, which had similar ancestry to the Friesian horse.

It is also hard to trace what happened to the bloodlines of destriers when this type seems to disappear from record during the 17th century. Many modern draft breeds claim some link to the medieval "great horse," with some historians considering breeds such as the Percheron, Belgian and Suffolk Punch likely descendants of the destrier. However, other historians discount this theory, since the historical record suggests the medieval warhorse was quite a different 'type' to the modern draught horse. Such a theory would suggest the war horses were crossed once again with "cold blooded" work horses, since war horses (and the destrier in particular) were renowned for their hot-blooded nature.

=== Types of horse ===
Throughout the period, horses were rarely considered breeds, but instead were defined by type: by describing their purpose or their physical attributes. Many of the definitions were not precise, or were interchangeable. Prior to approximately the 13th century, few pedigrees were written down. Thus, many terms for horses in the Middle Ages did not refer to breeds as we know them today, but rather described appearance or purpose.

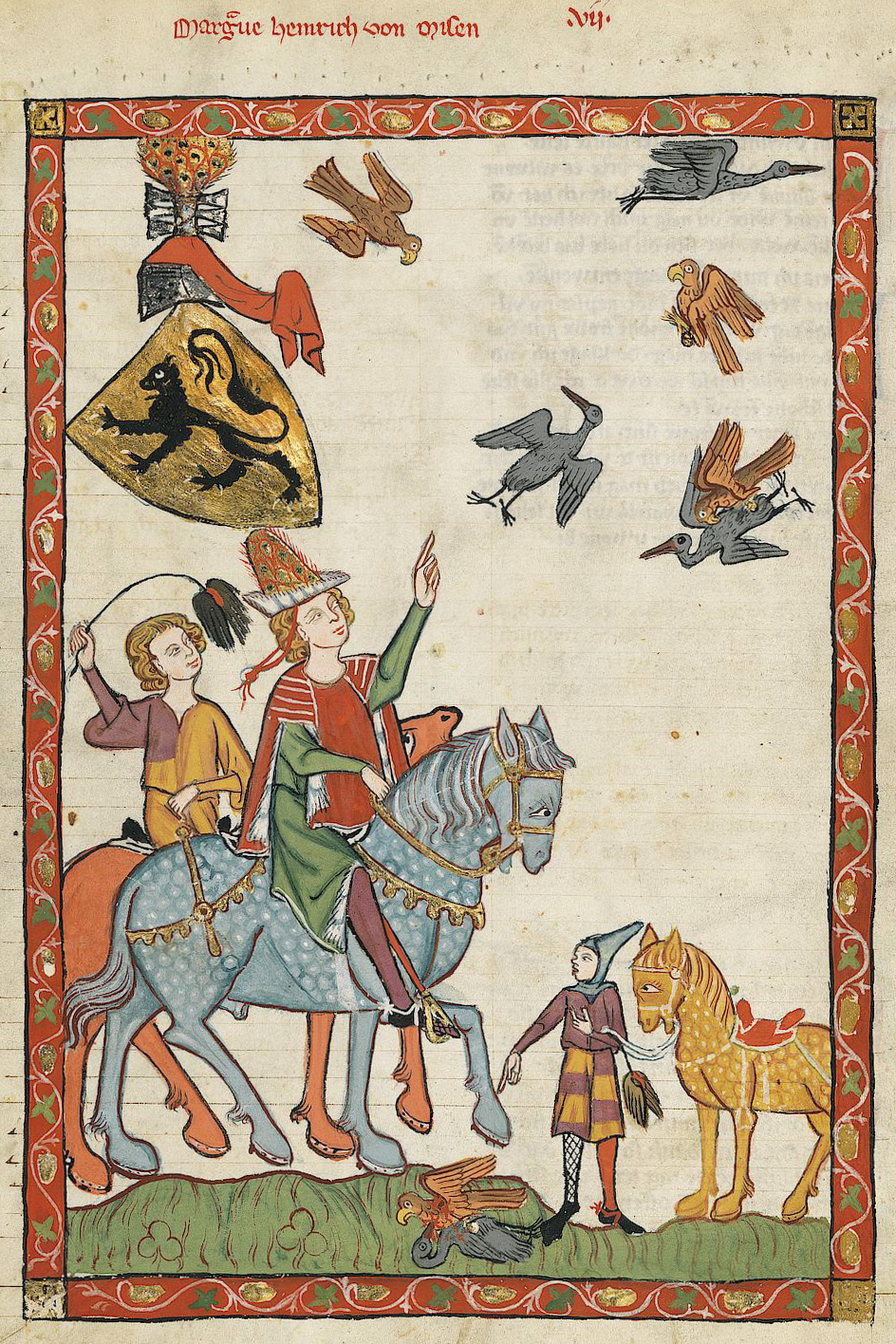
Medieval people engaging in falconry from horseback. The horses appear to have the body type of palfreys or jennets. from the Codex Manesse.

One of the best-known of the medieval horses was the destrier, renowned and admired for its capabilities in war. It was well trained, and was required to be strong, fast and agile. A 14th-century writer described them as "tall and majestic and with great strength". In contemporary sources, the destrier was frequently referred to as the "great horse" because of its size and reputation. Being a subjective term, it gives no firm information about its actual height or weight, but since the average horse of the time was 12 to 14 hands (48 to 56 inches, 122 to 142 cm), a "great horse" by medieval standards might appear small to modern eyes. The destrier was highly prized by knights and men-at-arms, but was actually not very common, and appears to have been most suited to the joust.

Coursers were generally preferred for hard battle as they were light, fast and strong. They were valuable, but not as costly as the destrier. They were also used frequently for hunting.

A more general-purpose horse was the rouncey (also rounsey), which could be kept as a riding horse or trained for war. It was commonly used by squires, men-at-arms or poorer knights. A wealthy knight would keep rounceys for his retinue. Sometimes the expected nature of warfare dictated the choice of horse; when a summons to war was sent out in England, in 1327, it expressly requested rounceys, for swift pursuit, rather than destriers. Rounceys were sometimes used as pack horses (but never as cart horses).

The well-bred palfrey, which could equal a destrier in price, was popular with nobles and highly ranked knights for riding, hunting and ceremonial use. Ambling was a desirable trait in a palfrey, as the smooth gait allowed the rider to cover long distances quickly in relative comfort. Other horse types included the jennet, a small horse first bred in Spain from Barb and Arabian bloodstock. Their quiet and dependable nature, as well as size, made them popular as riding horses for ladies; however, they were also used as cavalry horses by the Spanish.

The hobby was a lightweight horse, about 13 to 14 hands (52 to 56 inches, 132 to 142 cm), developed in Ireland from Spanish or Libyan (Barb) bloodstock. This type of quick and agile horse was popular for skirmishing, and was often ridden by light cavalry known as Hobelars. Hobbies were used successfully by both sides during the Wars of Scottish Independence, with Edward I of England trying to gain advantage by preventing Irish exports of the horses to Scotland. Robert Bruce employed the hobby for his guerilla warfare and mounted raids, covering 60 to 70 miles (97 to 113 km) a day.

== Horses in warfare ==
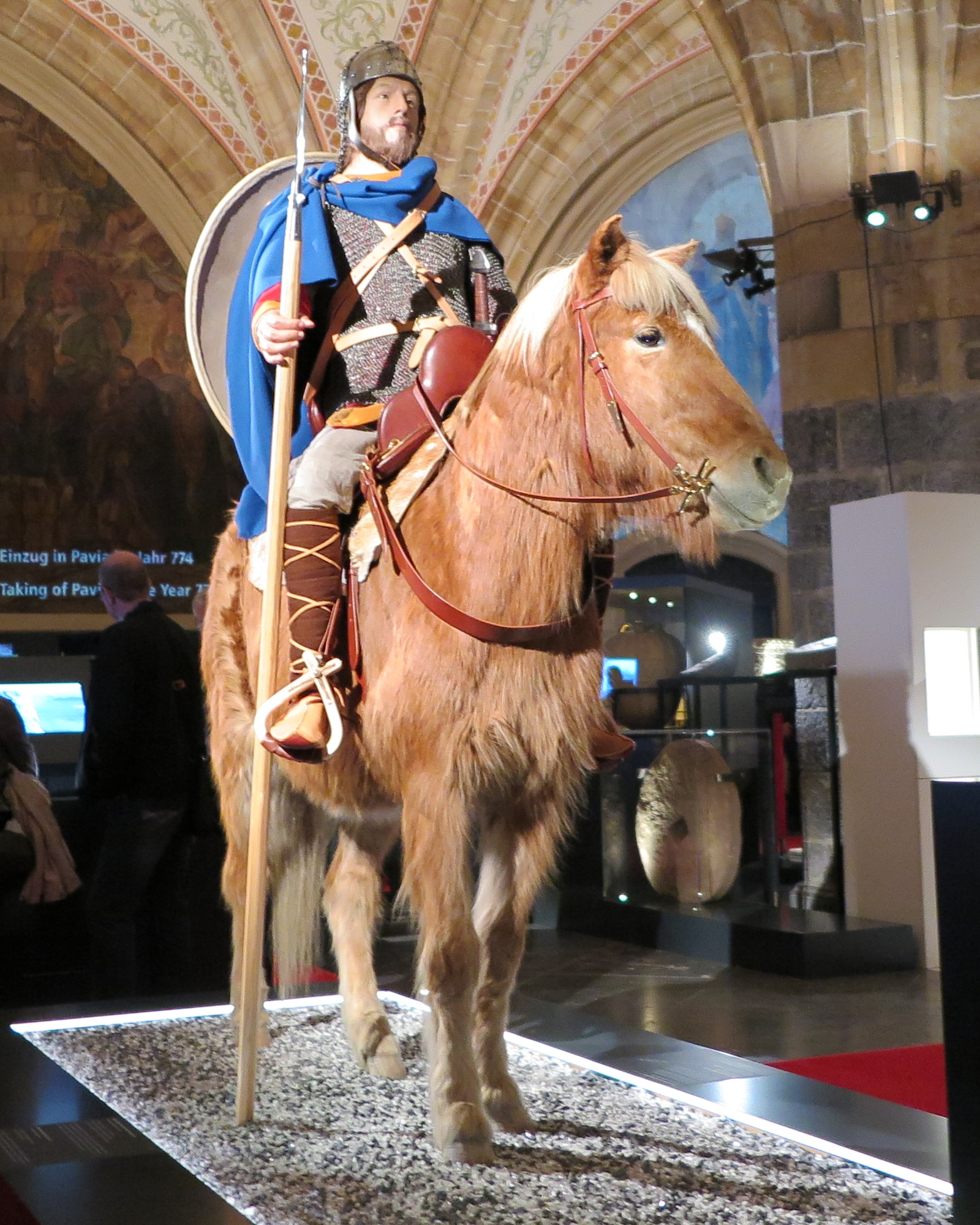
Carolingian warrior on a war horse with lance, round shield, chainmail and spangenhelm, 8th century

While light cavalry had been used in warfare for many centuries, the medieval era saw the rise of heavy cavalry, particularly the European knight. Historians are uncertain when the use of heavy cavalry in the form of mounted shock troops first occurred, but the technique had become widespread by the mid-12th century. The heavy cavalry charge itself was not a common occurrence in warfare. Pitched battles were avoided if at all possible, with most offensive warfare in the early Middle Ages taking the form of sieges, or swift mounted raids called chevauchées, with the warriors lightly armed on swift horses and their heavy war horses safely in the stable. Pitched battles were sometimes unavoidable, but were rarely fought on land suitable for heavy cavalry. While mounted riders remained effective for initial attacks, by the 14th century, it was common for knights to dismount to fight. Horses were sent to the rear, and kept ready for pursuit. By the Late Middle Ages (approx 1300–1550), large battles became more common, probably because of the success of infantry tactics and changes in weaponry. However, because such tactics left the knight unmounted, the role of the war horse also changed. By the 17th century, the medieval charger had become a thing of the past, replaced by lighter, unarmoured horses. Throughout the period, light horse, or prickers, were used for scouting and reconnaissance; they also provided a defensive screen for marching armies. Large teams of draught horses, or oxen, were used for pulling the heavy early cannon. Other horses pulled wagons and carried supplies for the armies.

=== Tournaments ===
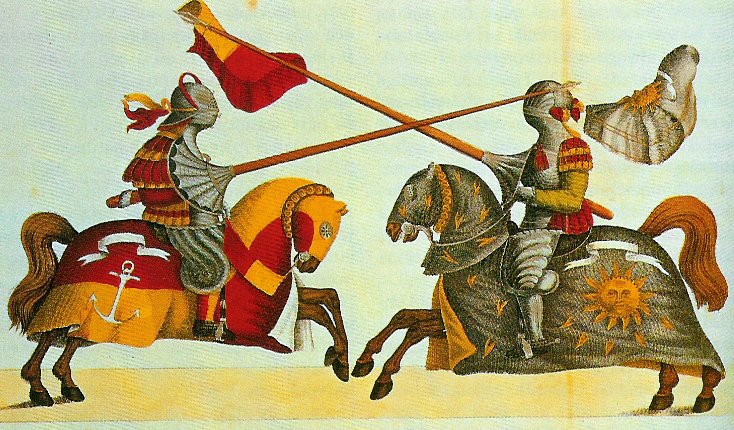
A later print of a 15th-century joust

Tournaments and hastiludes began in the 11th century as both a sport and to provide training for battle. Usually taking the form of a melee, the participants used the horses, armour and weapons of war. The sport of jousting grew out of the tournament and, by the 15th century, the art of tilting became quite sophisticated. In the process, the pageantry and specialization became less war-like, perhaps because of the knight's changing role in war.

Horses were specially bred for the joust, and heavier horse armour developed. However, this did not necessarily lead to significantly larger horses. Interpreters at the Royal Armouries, Leeds, re-created the joust, using specially bred horses and replica armour. Their horses accurately represented the medieval mount, being compactly built and not particularly tall.

=== Types of war horse ===
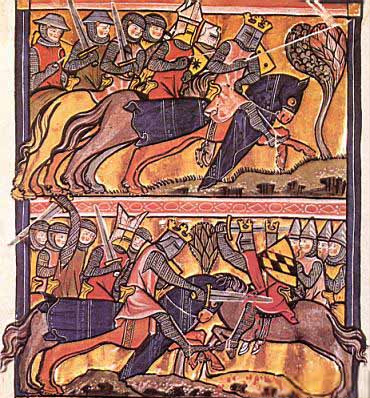
13th-century manuscript showing an approximate height of the medieval horse at the time; note the knights' legs extending well below the horses' barrels

The most well-known horse of the medieval era of Europe is the destrier, known for carrying knights into war. However, most knights and mounted men-at-arms rode smaller horses known as coursers and rounceys. (A common generic name for medieval war horses was charger, which was interchangeable with the other terms). In Spain, the jennet was used as a light cavalry horse.

Stallions were often used as war horses in Europe due to their natural aggression and hot-blooded tendencies. A 13th-century work describes destriers "biting and kicking" on the battlefield, and, in the heat of battle, war horses were often seen fighting each other. However, the use of mares by European warriors cannot be discounted from literary references. Mares were the preferred war horse of the Moors. They also were preferred by the Mongols.

War horses were more expensive than normal riding horses, and destriers the most prized, but figures vary greatly from source to source. Destriers are given a values ranging from seven times the price of an ordinary horse to 700 times. The Bohemian king Wenzel II rode a horse "valued at one thousand marks" in 1298. At the other extreme, a 1265 French ordinance ruled that a squire could not spend more than twenty marks on a rouncey. Knights were expected to have at least one war horse (as well as riding horses and packhorses), with some records from the later Middle Ages showing knights bringing twenty-four horses on campaign. Five horses was perhaps the standard.

=== Size of war horses ===
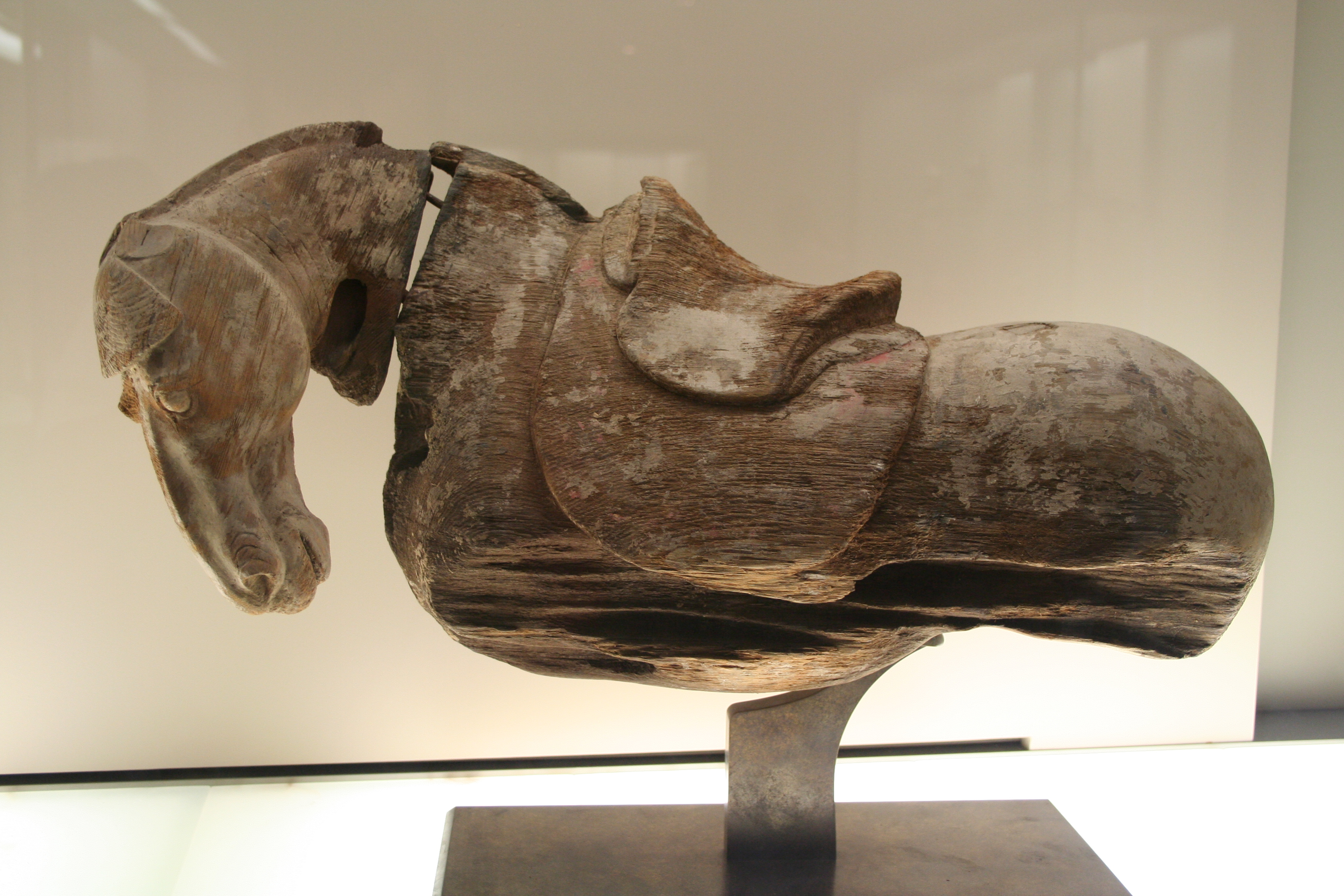
Wooden horse figurine, Tang dynasty

There is dispute in medievalist circles over the size of the war horse, with some notable historians claiming a size of 17 to 18 hands (68 to 72 inches, 173 to 183 cm), as large as a modern Shire horse. However, there are practical reasons for this dispute. Analysis of existing horse armour located in the Royal Armouries indicates the equipment was originally worn by horses of 15 to 16 hands (60 to 64 inches, 152 to 163 cm), or about the size and build of a modern field hunter or ordinary riding horse. Research undertaken at the Museum of London, using literary, pictorial and archaeological sources, supports military horses of 14 to 15 hands (56 to 60 inches, 142 to 152 cm), distinguished from a riding horse by its strength and skill, rather than its size. This average does not seem to vary greatly across the medieval period. Horses appear to have been selectively bred for increased size from the 9th and 10th centuries, and by the 11th century the average warhorse was probably 14.2 to 15 hands (58 to 60 inches, 147 to 152 cm), a size verified by studies of Norman horseshoes as well as the depictions of horses on the Bayeux Tapestry. Analysis of horse transports suggests 13th-century destriers were a stocky build, and no more than 15 to 15.2 hands (60 to 62 inches, 152 to 157 cm). Three centuries later, warhorses were not significantly bigger; the Royal Armouries used a 15.2 hands (62 inches, 157 cm) Lithuanian Heavy Draught mare as a model for the statues displaying various 15th- and 16th-century horse armours, as her body shape was an excellent fit.

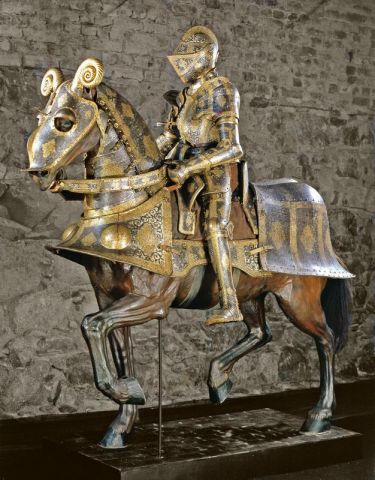
Ornate 16th-century armour for horse and knight, and typical high saddle. Royal Armoury, Stockholm

Perhaps one reason for the pervasive belief that the medieval war horse had to be of draught horse type is the assumption, still held by many, that medieval armour was heavy. In fact, even the heaviest tournament armour (for knights) weighed little more than 90 pounds (41 kg), and field (war) armour 40 to 70 pounds (18 to 32 kg); barding, or horse armour, rarely weighed more than 70 pounds (32 kg). Allowing for the weight of the rider and other equipment, horses can carry approximately 30% of their weight; thus such loads could certainly be carried by a heavy riding horse in the 1,200 to 1,300 pounds (540 to 590 kg) range, and a draught horse was not needed.

Although a large horse is not required to carry an armoured knight, it is held by some historians that a large horse was desirable to increase the power of a lance strike. However, practical experiments by re-enactors have suggested that the rider's weight and strength is of more relevance than the size of the mount, and that little of the horse's weight is translated to the lance.

Further evidence for a 14–16 hand (56 to 64 inches (140 to 160 cm)) war horse is that it was a matter of pride to a knight to be able to vault onto his horse in full armour, without touching the stirrup. This arose not from vanity, but necessity: if unhorsed during battle, a knight would remain vulnerable if unable to mount by himself. In reality, of course, a wounded or weary knight might find it difficult, and rely on a vigilant squire to assist him. Incidentally, a knight's armour served in his favour in any fall. With his long hair twisted on his head to form a springy padding under his padded-linen hood, and his helm placed on top, he had head protection not dissimilar to a modern bicycle or equestrian helmet.

== Transportation ==
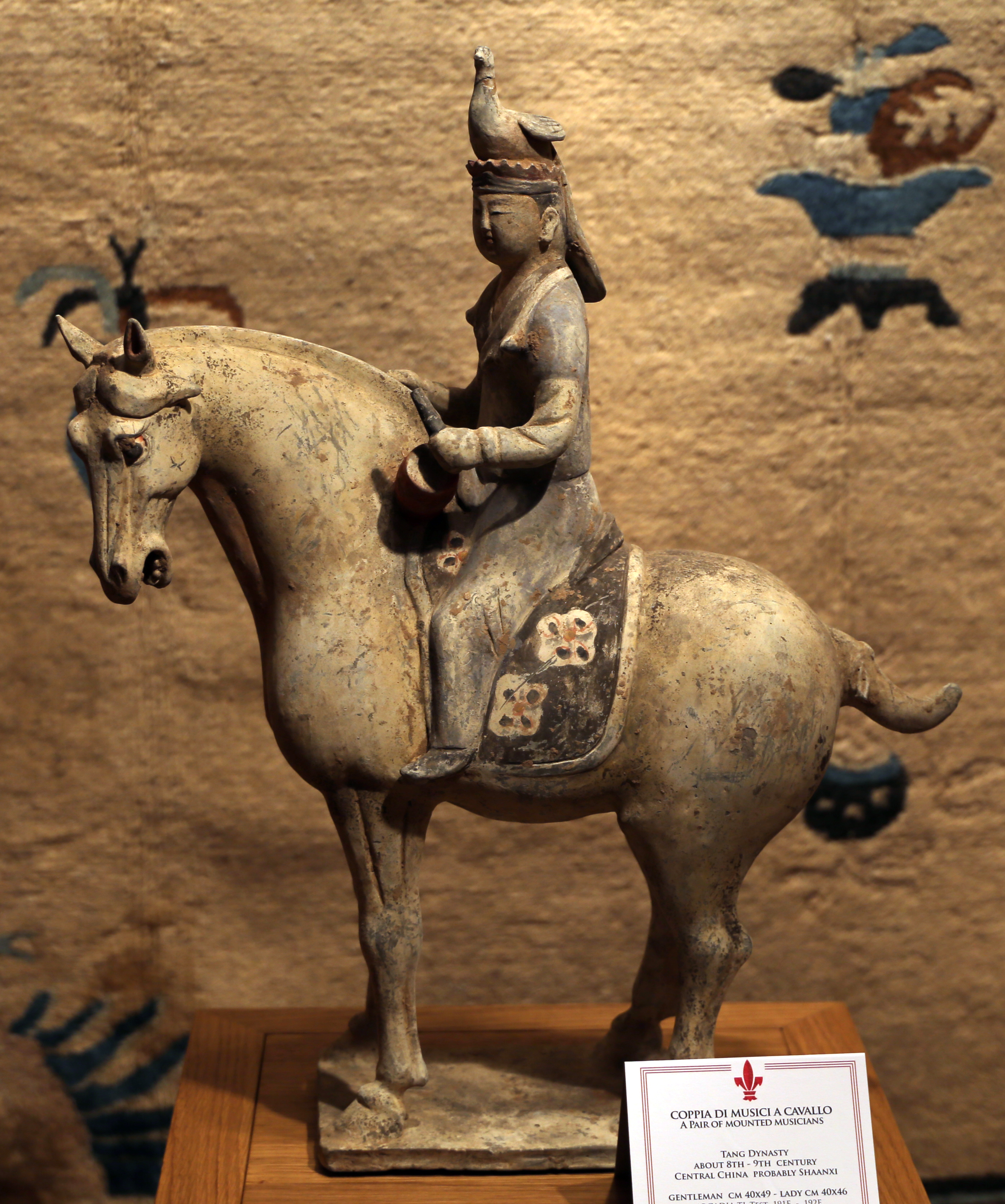
A bird on a man on a horse, Tang dynasty

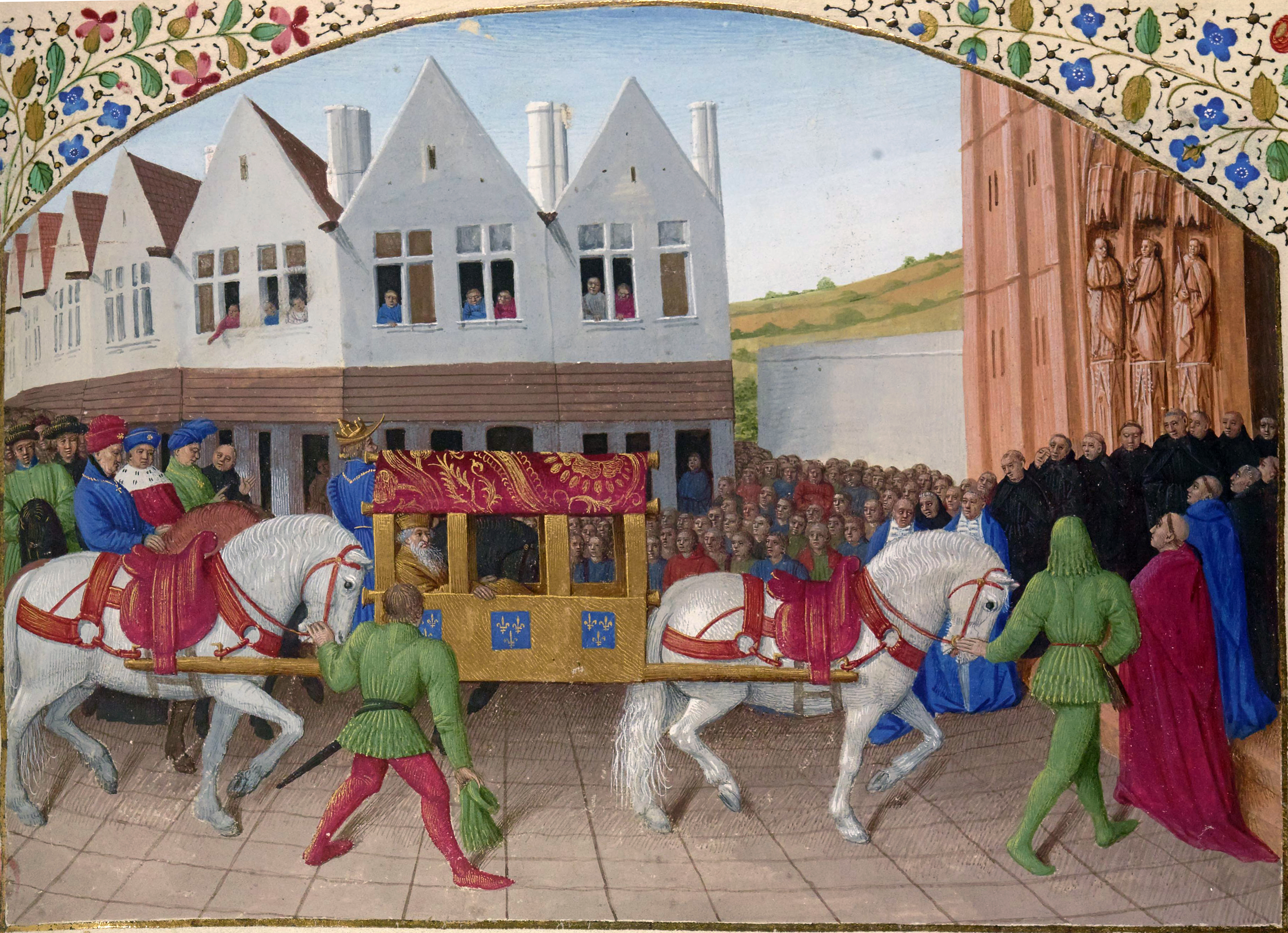
A horse litter

Throughout the Middle Ages it was customary for people of all classes and background to travel, often widely. The households of the upper classes and royal courts moved between manors and estates; the demands of diplomacy, war and crusades took men to distant countries; priests travelled between churches, monasteries and formed emissaries to Rome; people of all classes went on pilgrimage, or travelled to find work; others travelled as a pastime. Most people undertook small journeys on foot and hired horses for longer journeys. For the upper classes, travel was accompanied by a great deal of pomp and display, with fine horses, large retinues and magnificent cavalcades in order to display their wealth as well as to ensure personal comfort. For example, in 1445, the English royal household contained 60 horses in the king's stable and 186 kept for "chariots" (carriages) and carts.

During much of the Middle Ages, there was no system of interconnected roads and bridges. Though parts of Europe still had remnants of Roman roads built before the collapse of the Roman Empire, most had long fallen into disrepair. Because of the necessity to ride long distances over uncertain roads, smooth-gaited horses were preferred, and most ordinary riding horses were of greater value if they could do one of the smooth but ground-covering four-beat gaits collectively known as an amble rather than the more jarring trot.

Mule trains, for land travel, and barges, for river and canal travel, were the most common form of long-distance haulage, although wheeled horse-drawn vehicles were used for shorter journeys. In areas with good roads, regular carrier services were established between major towns. However, because medieval roads were generally so poor, carriages for human passengers were rare. When roads permitted, early carriages were developed from freight wagons. Carriage travel was made more comfortable in the late 14th century with the introduction of the chariot branlant, which had strap suspension.

The speed of travel varied greatly. Large retinues could be slowed by the presence of slow-paced carts and litters, or by servants and attendants on foot, and could rarely cover more than fifteen to twenty miles a day. Small mounted companies might travel 30 miles a day. However, there were exceptions: stopping only for a change of horses midway, Richard II of England once managed the 70 miles between Daventry and Westminster in a night.

For breeding, war and travel purposes, it was also necessary to be able to transport horses themselves. For this purpose, boats were adapted and built to be used as horse transports. William of Normandy's invasion of England in 1066 required the transfer of over 2000 horses from Normandy. Similarly, when travelling to France in 1285–86, Edward I of England ferried over 1000 horses across the English Channel to provide the royal party with transport.

=== Riding horses ===
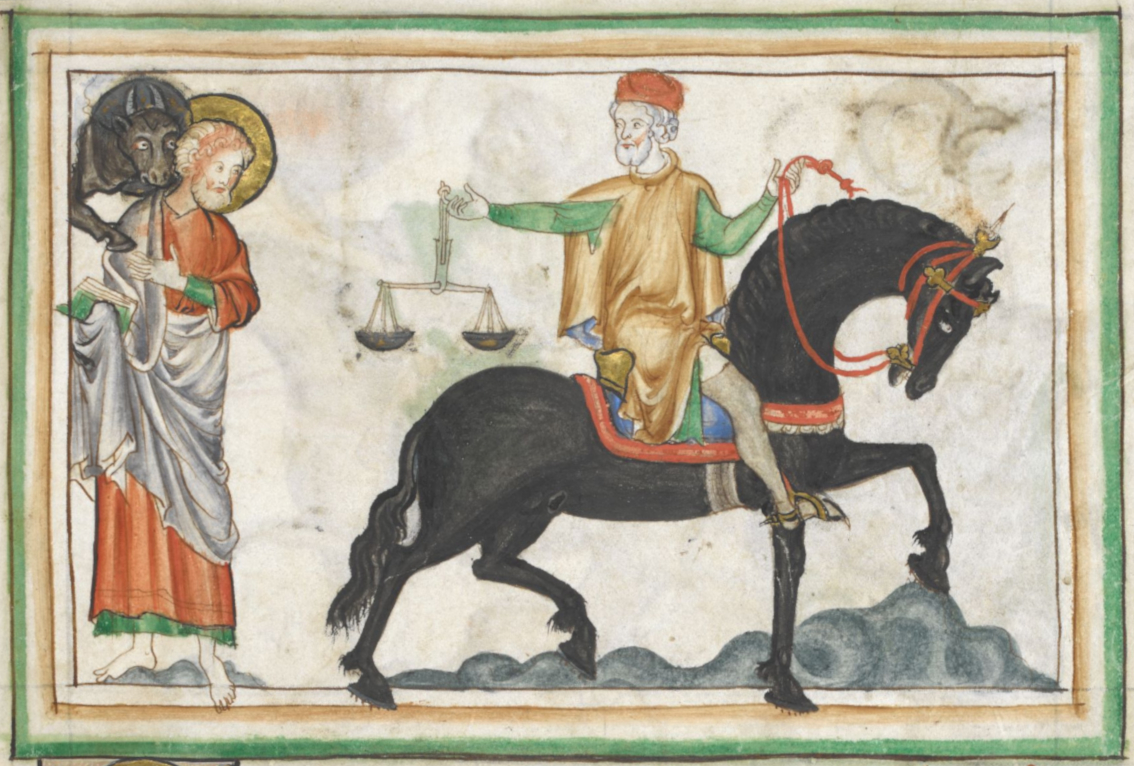
A 13th-century depiction of a riding horse.

Riding horses were used by a variety of people during the Middle Ages, and so varied greatly in quality, size and breeding. Knights and nobles kept riding horses in their war-trains, saving their warhorses for the battle. The names of horses referred to a type of horse, rather than a breed. Many horses were named by the region where they or their immediate ancestors were foaled. For example, in Germany, Hungarian horses were commonly used for riding. Individual horses were often described by their gait ('trotters' or 'amblers'), by their colouring, or by the name of their breeder.

The most typical riding horse was known as a rouncy. It was relatively small and inexpensive. The best riding horses were known as palfreys; another breed of horse was developed in the 14th century in England called a hackney, from which the modern term "hack" is derived. Because the hackney had a trotting gait it was not considered a comfortable ride for most purposes. Women sometimes rode rouncies, palfreys or small horses known as jennets.

=== Harness and pack horses ===
A variety of work horses were used throughout the Middle Ages. The pack horse (or "sumpter horse") carried equipment and belongings. Common riding horses, often called "hackneys", could be used as pack horses. Cart horses pulled wagons for trading and freight haulage, on farms, or as part of a military campaign. These draught horses were smaller than their modern counterparts; pictorial and archaeological evidence suggests that they were stout but short, approximately 13 to 14 hands (52 to 56 inches, 132 to 142 cm), and capable of drawing a load of 500 to 600 pounds (230 to 270 kg) per horse. Four-wheeled wagons and two-wheeled carts were more common in towns, such as London and, depending on type of vehicle and weight of the load, were usually pulled by teams of two, three, or four horses harnessed in tandem. Starting in the 12th century, in England the use of oxen to pull carts was gradually superseded by the use of horses, a process that extended through the 13th century. This change came because horse-drawn transport moved goods quicker and over greater distances than ox-drawn methods of transport.

== Agriculture ==
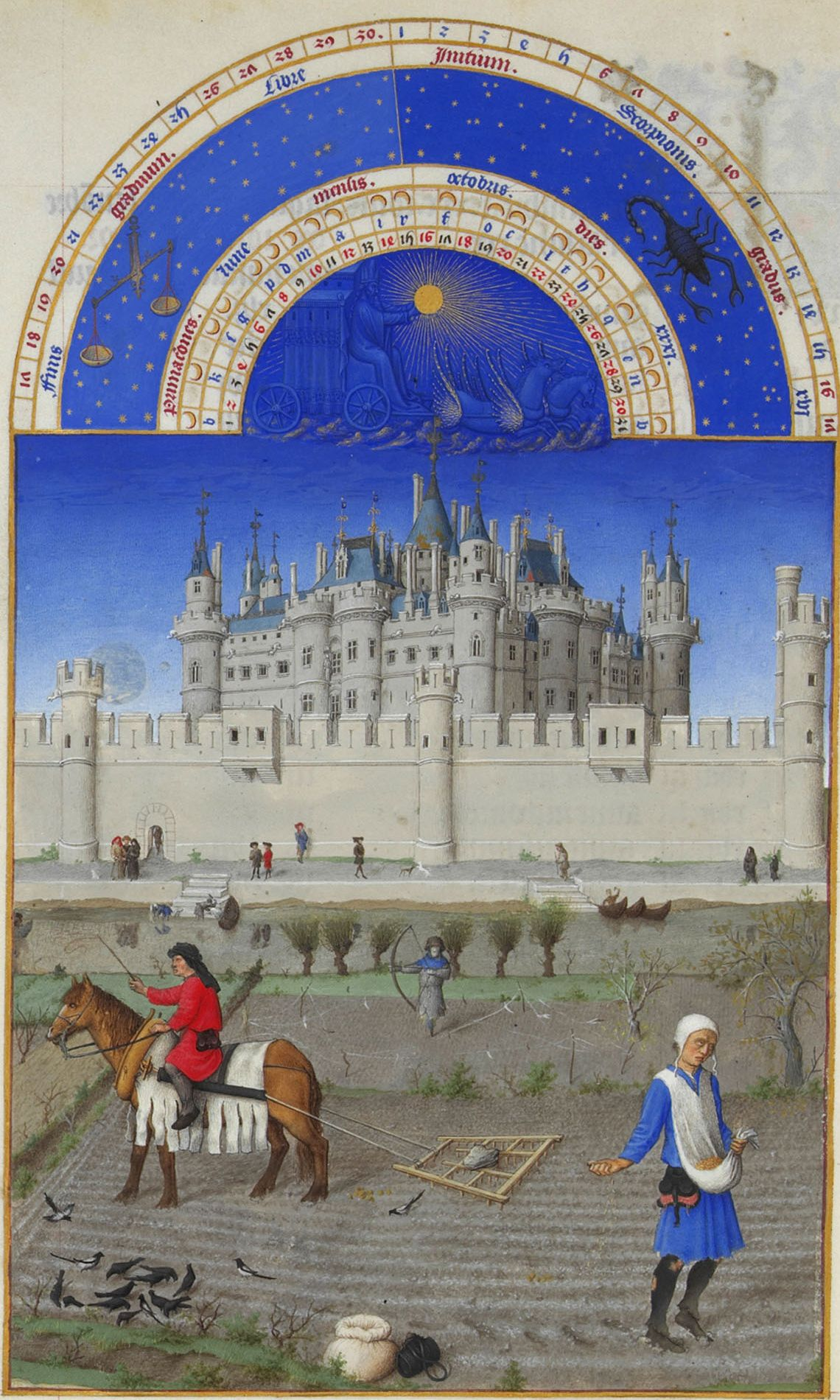
This horse is fitted with a horse collar to bear the weight of the harrow. October, Les Très Riches Heures du duc de Berry

The Romans had used a two-field crop-rotation agricultural system, but from the 8th century on, a three-field system became more common. One field would be sown with a winter crop, the second with a spring crop, and the third left fallow. This allowed the production of a greater amount of spring-crop oats, which provided fodder for horses. Another advance during the Middle Ages was the development of the heavy mouldboard plough, which encouraged the tilling of dense and heavy soils; this technology required the use of larger teams of draught animals including oxen and horses, as well as the adoption of larger fields. Particularly after the 12th century, the increased use both of the horse collar and of iron horse-shoes allowed a more efficient application of horsepower. Horse teams usually comprised four horses, or perhaps six, as compared to teams of eight oxen, and the lesser numbers compensated for the fact that the horses needed to be fed grain on top of pasture, unlike oxen. The increased speed of horses also allowed the ploughing of more land in a day, with an eight-ox plough-team averaging half of an acre per day, but a horse team averaging a full acre per day.

For farm work, such as ploughing and harrowing, the draught horses utilized for these purposes were, in England, called 'affers' and 'stotts' (affrus and stottus in medieval Latin). These horses were usually smaller and cheaper than the cart horse. The difference between affers and stotts was largely nominal. Medieval English records from south-east England and East Anglia typically use the term 'stott' (Modern English stot or stott), while 'affer' is used in documents from across the rest of the country. While oxen were traditionally used as work-animals on farms, horses began to be used in greater numbers after the development of the horse collar. Oxen and horses were sometimes harnessed together. The transition from oxen to horses for farm work was documented in pictorial sources (for example, the 11th-century Bayeux Tapestry depicts working horses), and also clear from the change from the Roman two-field crop-rotation system to a new three-field system, which increased the cultivation of fodder crops (predominantly oats, barley and beans). Horses were also used to process crops; they were used to turn the wheels in mills (such as corn mills), and to transport crops to market. The change to horse-drawn teams also meant a change in ploughs, as horses were more suited to a wheeled plough, unlike oxen.

== Equestrian equipment and technological innovations ==
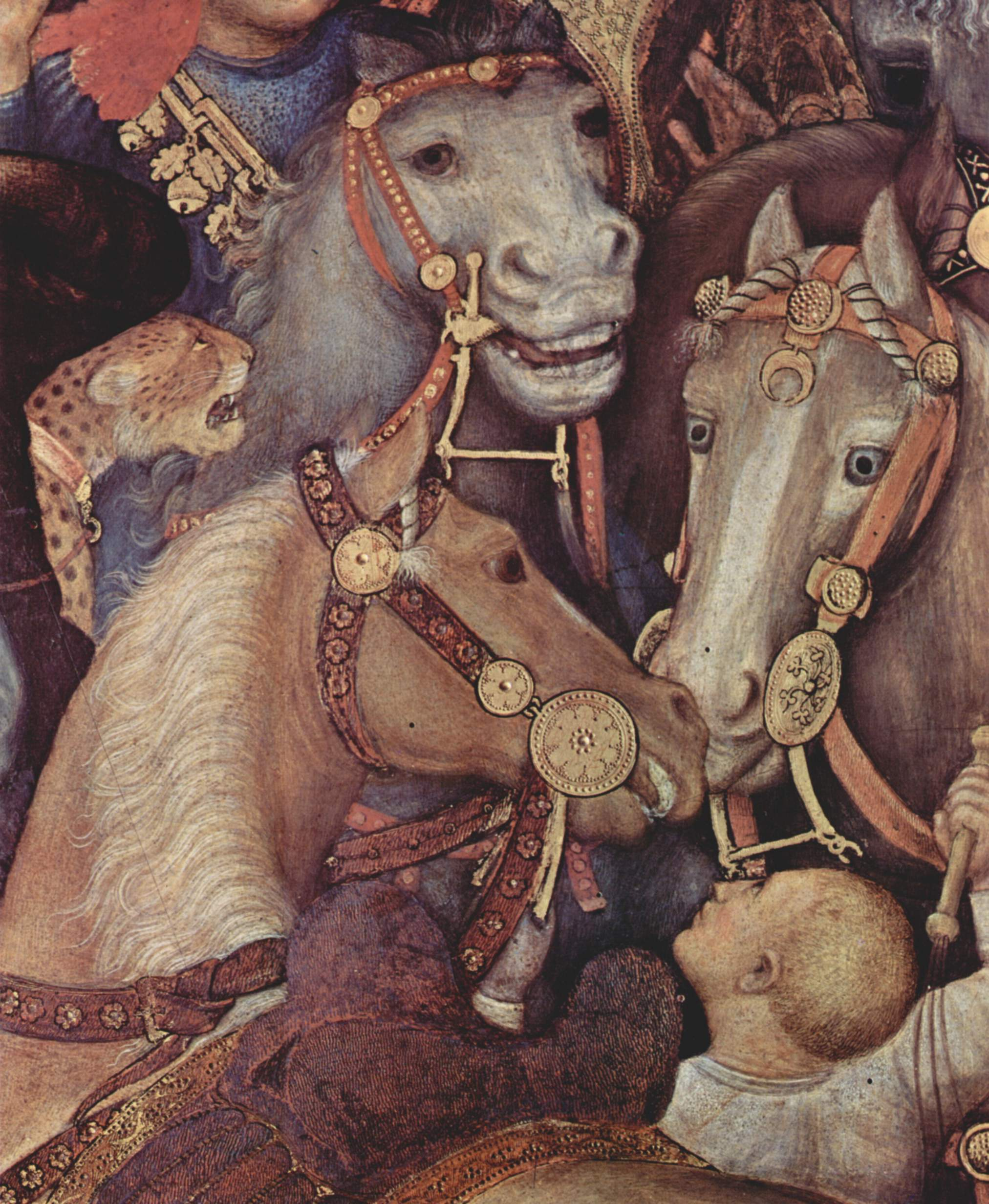
Detail from 15th-century painting by Gentile da Fabriano, showing curb bits, with ornamental bosses at the sides of the mouthpiece

The development of equestrian technology proceeded at a similar pace as the development of horse breeding and utilisation. The changes in warfare during the Early Middle Ages to heavy cavalry both precipitated and relied on the arrival of the stirrup, solid-treed saddle, and horseshoe from other cultures.

The development of the nailed horseshoe enabled longer, faster journeys on horseback, particularly in the wetter lands in northern Europe, and were useful for campaigns on varied terrains. By providing protection and support, nailed horse shoes also improved the efficiency of draught horse teams. Though the Romans had developed an iron "hipposandal" that resembled a hoof boot, there is much debate over the actual origins of the nailed horseshoe, though it does appear to be of European origin. There is little evidence of nailed-on shoes prior to AD 500 or 600, though there is speculation that the Celtic Gauls were the first to nail on metal horseshoes. The earliest clear written record of iron horseshoes is a reference to "crescent figured irons and their nails" in a list of cavalry equipment from AD 910. Additional archaeological evidence suggests they were used in Siberia during the 9th and 10th centuries, and had spread to Byzantium soon afterward; by the 11th century, horseshoes were commonly used in Europe. By the time the Crusades began in 1096, horseshoes were widespread and frequently mentioned in various written sources.

=== Riding technology ===
The saddle with a solid tree provided a bearing surface to protect the horse from the weight of the rider. The Romans are credited with the invention of the solid-treed saddle, possibly as early as the 1st century BC, and it was widespread by the 2nd century AD. Early medieval saddles resembled the Roman "four-horn" saddle, and were used without stirrups. The development of the solid saddle tree was significant; it raised the rider above the horse's back, and distributed the rider's weight, reducing the pressure on any one part of the horse's back, thus greatly increasing the comfort of the horse and prolonging its useful life. Horses could carry more weight when distributed across a solid saddle tree. It also allowed a more built up seat to give the rider greater security in the saddle. From the 12th century on, the high war-saddle became more common, providing protection as well as added security. The built up cantle of a solid-treed saddle enabled horsemen to use lance more effectively.

Beneath the saddle, caparisons or saddle cloths were sometimes worn; these could be decorated or embroidered with heraldic colours and arms. War horses could be equipped with additional covers, blankets and armour collectively referred to as barding; this could be for decorative or protective purposes. Early forms of horse armour, usually restricted to tournaments, comprised padded leather pieces, covered by a trapper (a decorated cloth), which was not particularly heavy. Mail and plate armour was also occasionally used; there are literary references to horse armour (an "iron blanket") starting in the late 12th century.

The solid tree allowed for effective use of the stirrup. The stirrup was developed in China and in widespread use there by 477 AD. By the 7th century, primarily due to invaders from Central Asia, such as the Avars, stirrups arrived in Europe, and European riders had adopted them by the 8th century. Among other advantages, stirrups provided greater balance and support to the rider, which allowed the knight to use a sword more efficiently without falling, especially against infantry.

The increased use of the stirrup from the 8th century on aided the warrior's stability and security in the saddle when fighting. This may have led to greater use of shock tactics, although a couched lance could be used effectively without stirrups. In particular, Charles Martel recognized the military potential of the stirrup, and distributed seized lands to his retainers on condition that they serve him by fighting in the new manner.

A theory known as The Great Stirrup Controversy argues that the advantages in warfare that stemmed from use of the stirrup led to the birth of feudalism itself. Other scholars, however, dispute this assertion, suggesting that stirrups provided little advantage in shock warfare, being useful primarily for allowing a rider to lean farther to the left and right on the saddle while fighting, and simply reduce the risk of falling off. Therefore, it is argued, they are not the reason for the switch from infantry to cavalry in Medieval militaries, nor the reason for the emergence of Feudalism.

There was a variety of headgear used to control horses, predominantly bridles with assorted designs of bits. Many of the bits used during the Middle Ages resemble the bradoon, snaffle bit and curb bit that are still in common use today. However, they often were decorated to a greater degree: the bit rings or shanks were frequently covered with large, ornamental "bosses." Some designs were also more extreme and severe than those used today. The curb bit was known during the classical period, but was not generally used during the Middle Ages until the mid-14th century. Some styles of snaffle bit used during the Middle Ages had the lower cheek extended, in the manner of the modern half-cheek or full cheek snaffle. Until the late 13th century, bridles generally had a single pair of reins; after this period it became more common for knights to use two sets of reins, similar to that of the modern double bridle, and often at least one set was decorated.

Spurs were commonly used throughout the period, especially by knights, with whom they were regularly associated. A young man was said to have "won his spurs" when he achieved knighthood. Wealthy knights and riders frequently wore decorated and filigreed spurs. Attached to the rider's heel by straps, spurs could be used both to encourage horses to quickly move forward or to direct lateral movement. Early spurs had a short shanks or "neck", placing the rowel relatively close to the rider's heel; further developments in the spur shape lengthened the neck, making it easier to touch the horse with less leg movement on the part of the rider.

=== Harness technology ===
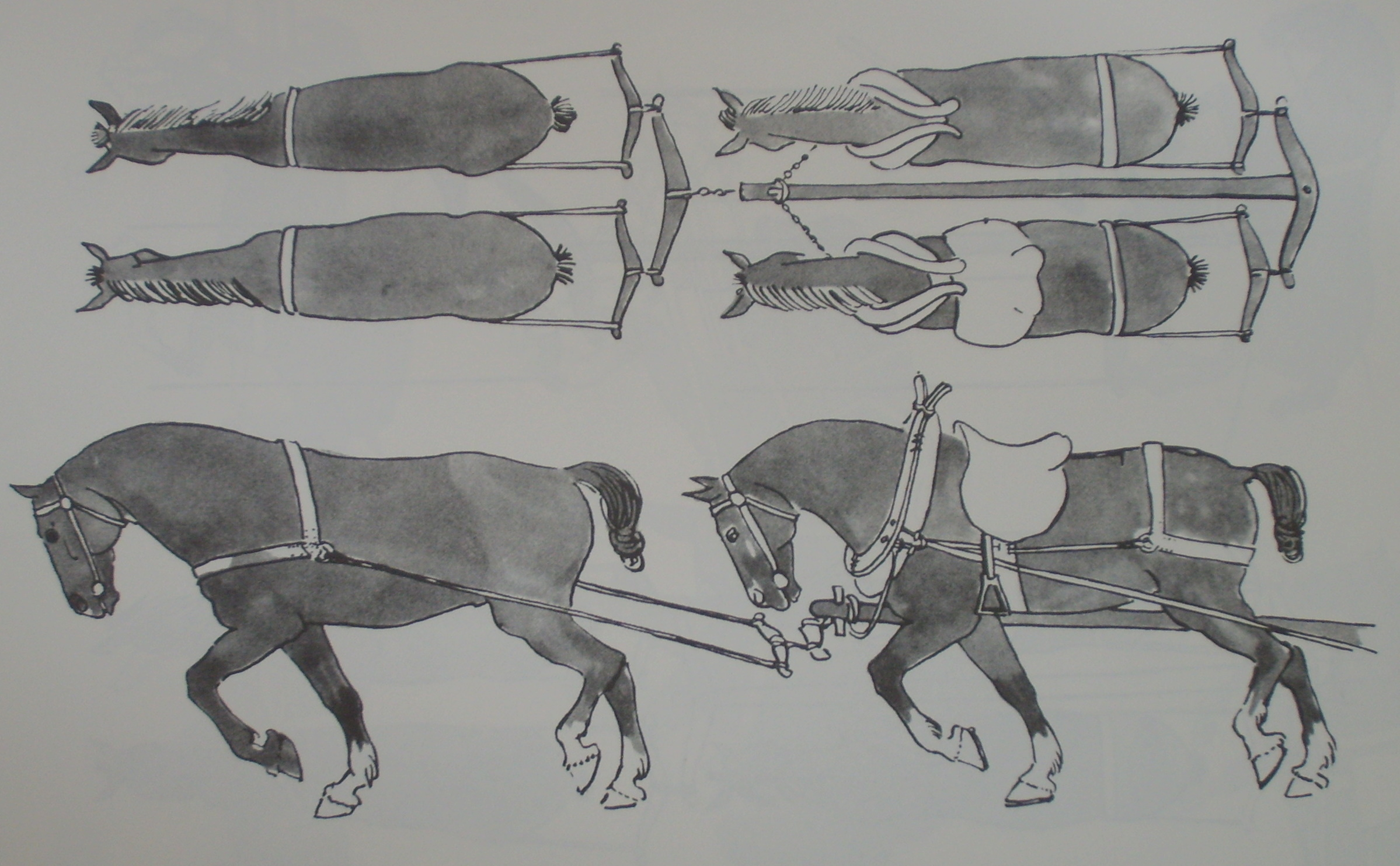
In this depiction of a medieval horse team, the lead pair have breast collars, while the trace pair wear horse collars. Note that one horse is saddled.

A significant development which increased the importance and use of horses in harness, particularly for ploughing and other farm work, was the horse collar. The horse collar was invented in China during the 5th century, arrived in Europe during the 9th century, and became widespread throughout Europe by the 12th century. It allowed horses to pull greater weight than they could when hitched to a vehicle by means of yokes or breastcollars used in earlier times. The yoke was designed for oxen and not suited to the anatomy of horses, it required horses to pull with their shoulders rather than using the power of their hindquarters. Harnessed in such a manner, horse teams could pull no more than 500 kg. The breastplate-style harness that had flat straps across the neck and chest of the animal, while useful for pulling light vehicles, was of little use for heavy work. These straps pressed against the horse's sterno-cephalicus muscle and trachea, which restricted breathing and reduced the pulling power of the horse. Two horses harnessed with a breastcollar harness were limited to pulling a combined total of about 1,100 pounds (500 kg). In contrast, the horse collar rested on horses' shoulders and did not impede breathing. It allowed a horse to use its full strength, by pushing forward with its hindquarters into the collar rather than to pull with its shoulders. With the horse collar, a horse could provide a work effort of 50% more foot-pounds per second than an ox, because it could move at a greater speed, as well as having generally greater endurance and the ability to work more hours in a day. A single horse with a more efficient collar harness could draw a weight of about 1,500 pounds (680 kg).

A further improvement was managed by altering the arrangement of the teams; by hitching horses one behind the other, rather than side by side, weight could be distributed more evenly, and pulling power increased. This increase in horse power is demonstrated in the building accounts of Troyes, which show carters hauling stone from quarries 50 miles (80 km) distant; the carts weighed, on average, 5,500 pounds (2,500 kg), on which 5,500 pounds (2,500 kg) of stone was regularly loaded, sometimes increasing to 8,600 pounds (3,900 kg) – a significant increase from Roman-era loads.

== Horse trades and professions ==
The elite horseman of the Middle Ages was the knight. Generally raised from the middle and upper classes, the knight was trained from childhood in the arts of war and management of the horse. In most languages, the term for knight reflects his status as a horseman: the Italian cavaliere, the French chevalier, Spanish caballero and German Ritter. The French word for horse-mastery – chevalerie – gave its name to the highest concept of knighthood: chivalry.

A large number of trades and positions arose to ensure the appropriate management and care of horses. In aristocratic households, the marshal was responsible for all aspects relating to horses: the care and management of all horses from the chargers to the pack horses, as well as all travel logistics. The position of marshal (literally "horse servant") was a high one in court circles and the king's marshal (such as the Earl Marshal in England) was also responsible for managing many military matters. Also present within the great households was the constable (or "count of the stable"), who was responsible for protection and the maintenance of order within the household and commanding the military component and, with marshals, might organise hastiludes and other chivalrous events. Within lower social groupings, the 'marshal' acted as a farrier. The highly skilled marshal made and fitted horseshoes, cared for the hoof, and provided general veterinary care for horses; throughout the Middle Ages, a distinction was drawn between the marshal and the blacksmith, whose work was more limited.

A number of tradesmen dealt with the provision of horses. Horse dealers (frequently called "horse coursers" in England) bought and sold horses, and frequently had a reputation as dishonest figures, responsible for the brisk trade in stolen horses. Others, such as the "hackneymen" offered horses for hire, and many formed large establishments on busy roads, often branding their horses to deter theft.

== Women and horses ==
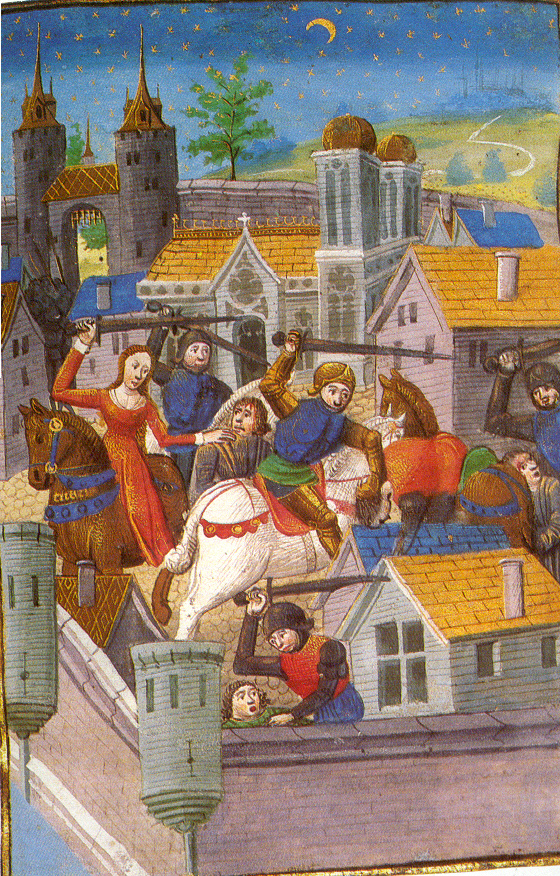
This medieval painting shows a woman in a dress mounted on a war horse, riding astride, not sidesaddle.

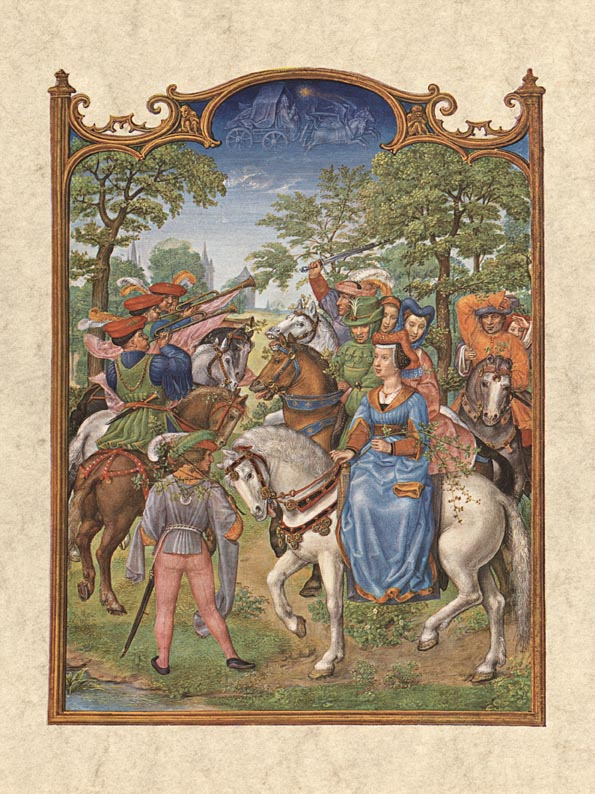
Depiction of a lady riding in an early sidesaddle of a design credited to Anne of Bohemia (1366–1394) – Gerard Horenbout, 16th century.

It was not uncommon for a girl to learn her father's trade and for a woman to share her husband's trade, since the entire family often helped run medieval shops and farms. Many guilds also accepted the membership of widows, so they might continue their husband's business. Under this system, some women trained in horse-related trades, and there are records of women working as farriers and saddle-makers. On farms, where every hand was needed, excessive emphasis on division of labour was impracticable, and women often worked alongside men (on their own farms or as hired help), leading the farm horses and oxen, and managing their care.

Despite the difficulties of travel, it was customary for many people, including women, to travel long distances. Upper-class wives frequently accompanied their husbands on crusade or to tournaments, and many women traveled for social or family engagements; both nuns and laywomen would perform pilgrimages. When not on foot, women would usually travel on horseback or, if weakened or infirm, be carried in a wagon or a litter. If roads permitted, women sometimes rode in early carriages developed from freight wagons, pulled by three or four horses. After the invention of better suspension systems, travel in carriages became more comfortable. Women of the nobility also rode horses for sport, accompanying men in activities that included hunting and hawking.

Most medieval women rode astride. Although an early chair-like sidesaddle with handles and a footrest was available by the 13th century and allowed women of the nobility to ride while wearing elaborate gowns, they were not universally adopted during the Middle Ages. This was largely due to the insecure seat they offered, which necessitated a smooth-gaited horse being led by another handler. The sidesaddle did not become practical for everyday riding until the 16th-century development of the pommel horn that allowed a woman to hook her leg around the saddle and hence use the reins to control her own horse. Even then, sidesaddle riding remained a precarious activity until the invention of the second, "leaping horn" in the 19th century.

It was not unknown for women to ride war horses, and take their part in warfare. Joan of Arc is probably the most famous female warrior of the medieval period, but there were many others, including the Empress Matilda who, armoured and mounted, led an army against her cousin Stephen of Blois, and Stephen's wife Matilda of Boulogne in the 12th century. The 15th-century writer Christine de Pizan advised aristocratic ladies that they must "know the laws of arms and all things pertaining to warfare, ever prepared to command her men if there is need of it."

== See also ==
- Horse transports in the Middle Ages
- Domestication of the horse
- Animal representation in Western medieval art
