= Rouncey =

Historic term for a type of horse

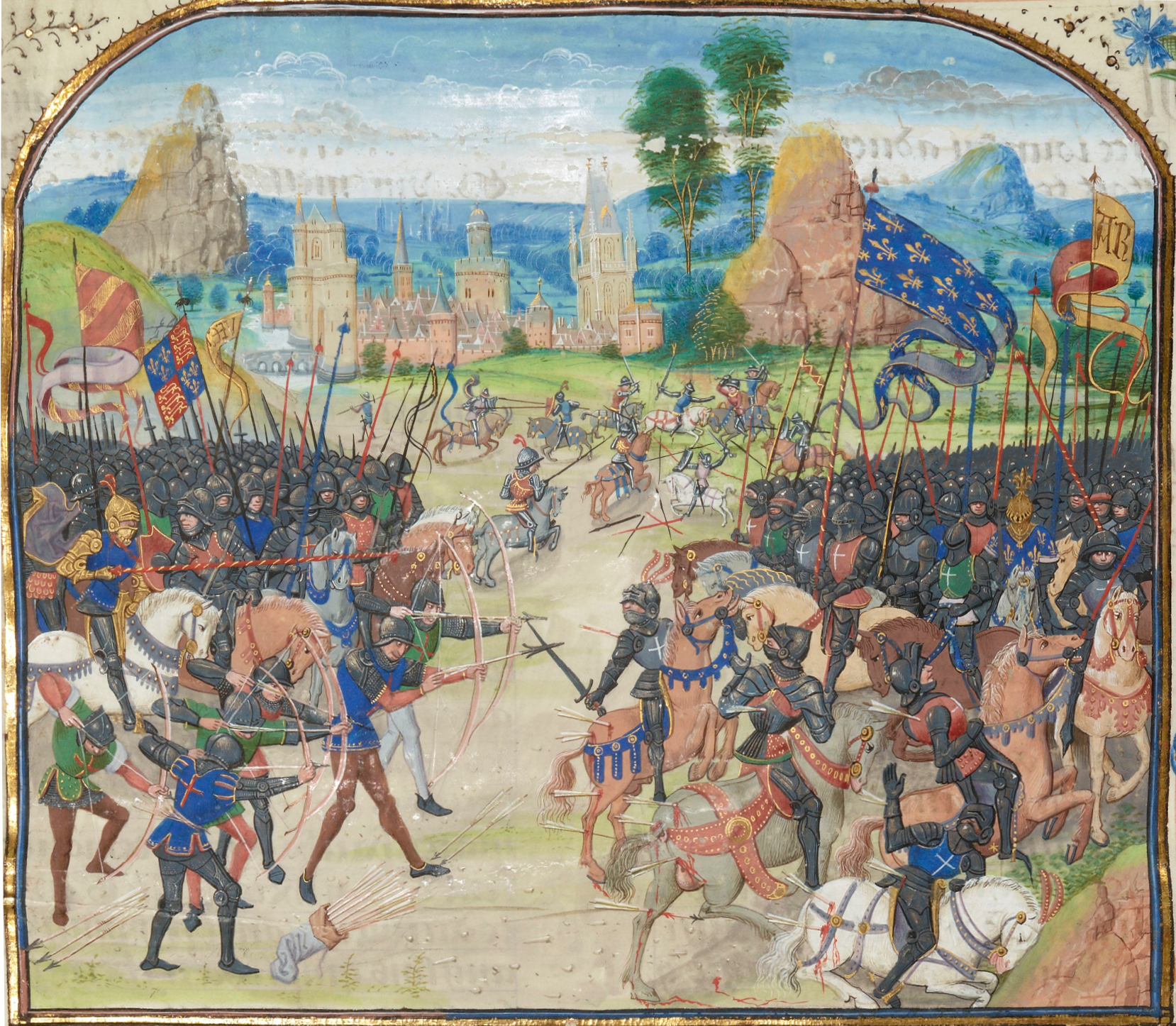
A 15th century miniature depicting the Battle of Poitiers. A variety of horses can be seen.

During the Middle Ages the term "rouncey" (also spelt rouncy or rounsey) referred to an ordinary, all-purpose horse. Rounceys were used for riding, but could also be trained for war. It was not unknown for them to be used as pack horses. The horse, which was also referred to as runcinus, is believed to have been a harrowing animal on account of its proportions as found in demesne stock-listings before it became an exclusively riding animal.

== Use in warfare ==
While the destrier is the most well-known warhorse of the Medieval era, it was the least common, and coursers were often preferred for battle. Both were expensive, highly trained horses prized by knights and nobles, while a poorer knight, squire or man-at-arms would use a rouncey for fighting. A wealthy knight would provide rounceys for his retinue.

Sometimes the expected nature of warfare dictated the choice of horse; when a summons to war was sent out in England in 1327, it expressly requested rounceys, for swift pursuit, rather than destriers. Small sized rounceys were also preferred by mounted archers.

== See also ==
- Horses in the Middle Ages
- Irish Hobby
- Palfrey
