= Hastilude =

Generic Medieval name for martial games

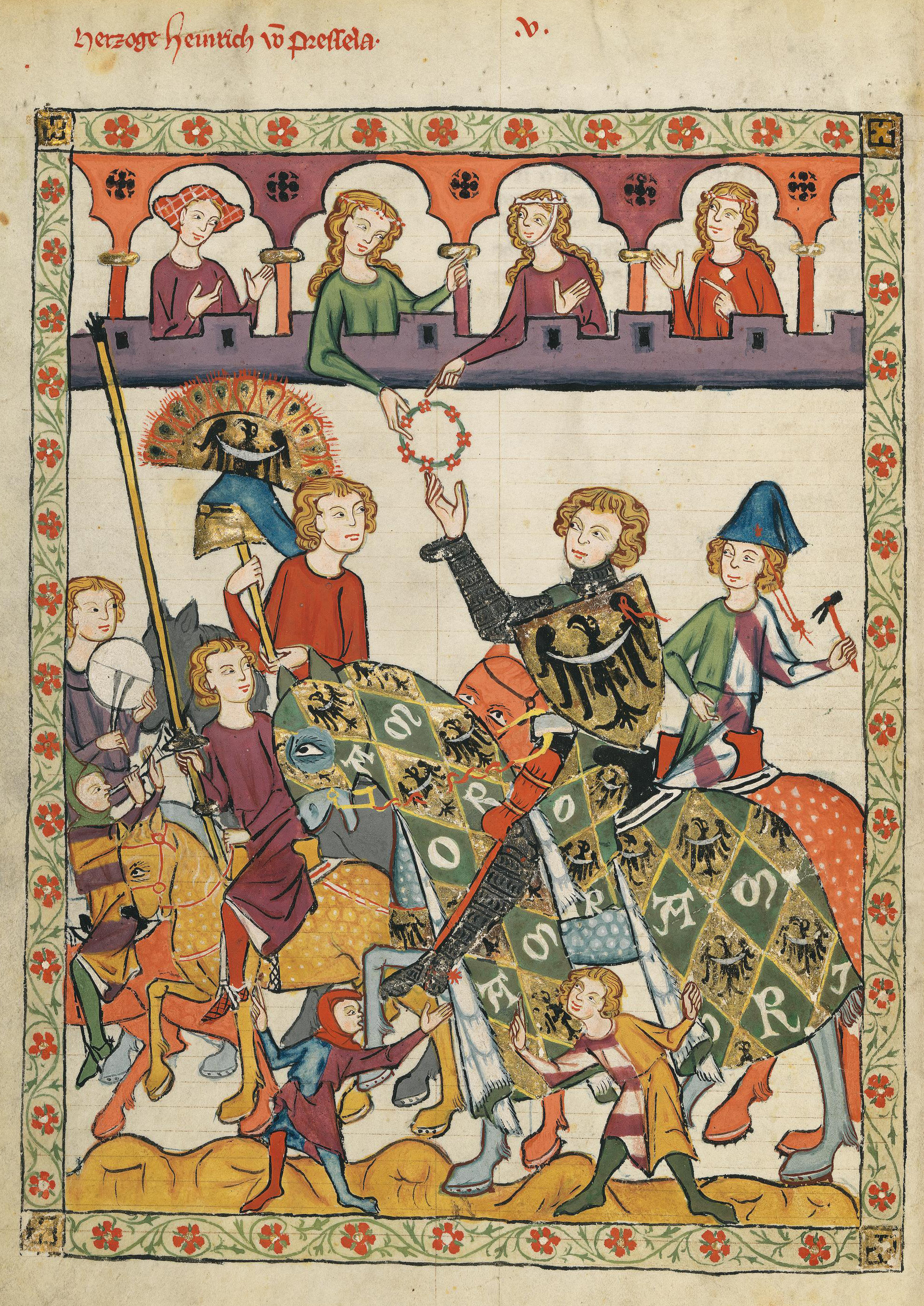
A knight receiving a lady's favour at a hastilude. From Codex Manesse.

Hastilude is a generic term used in the Middle Ages to refer to many kinds of martial games. The word comes from the Latin hastiludium, literally "lance game". By the 14th century, the term usually excluded tournaments and was used to describe the other games collectively; this seems to have coincided with the increasing preference for ritualistic and individualistic games over the traditional mêlée style.

Today, the most well-known of the hastiludes are the tournament, or tourney, and the joust, but over the medieval period a number of other games and sports developed, which differed in popularity and rules from area to area, and from period to period. Distinction was made between the different types by contemporaries in their description, laws, prohibitions, and customs.

Hastilude has left behind a legacy that has been carried on in this modern age, with different re-enactment groups practicing and participating in their own tournaments, while its roots in entertainment are still prevalent with its popularization from renaissance fairs and other medieval celebrations. The tournaments and jousts also gave way to regulated sporting events that are common in today’s society.

== History ==
Hastilude was developed in the early 1100s when it became an expression of aristocratic leisure activities. The most important pieces of this period were the tournaments and joust games that were developed as both social and sportive ceremonies. These ceremonies would feature concepts such as jousting, heraldry and political engagement.

The popularization of hastilude and the “joust games” that were featured in tournaments began once the tournaments became tied in with warfare and the theme of Chivalry that would become present in medieval society. Warfare attracted the attention of those willing to put their life on the line in the face of danger and to demonstrate their honor, as well as attracting those willing to spectate the activity.

These melee style engagements evolved from training exercises for soldiers and into ritualized individual combat between participants. Hastilude had differentiating variations across the regions of Europe, even suffering from legal restrictions, primarily from the church which led to occasional bans in certain regions. However, the chivalric ethos that developed from hastilude got its main point through tournaments and jousts.

As tournaments evolved from military training exercises into more regulated events, medieval society changed alongside the tournaments. Tournaments were popularized through the increased rate of them and they began to be used as a form of social networking; aristocrats could use the platform to enhance their political alliances, rulers could showcase their leadership and authority, while knights could intensify their prestige through victory. These tournaments became larger and more festive, acting as celebrations in times of importance.

The transformation of these tournaments into regulated sporting events also serves as some of the first instances of sports in medieval Europe. Other sports like archery and football were popularized in the era, but jousting specifically has become the most iconic of the few.

== Types of hastiludes ==
=== Joust ===
In contrast to the tournament, which comprised teams of large numbers ranging over large tracts of land, the joust was fought between two individuals on horseback, in a small, defined ground often known as the lists. The two would ride at each other from opposite ends, charging with a couched lance. In the early 15th century, a barrier was introduced to keep the horses apart, to avoid collisions.

More informal jousting events would have several horsemen within the lists at once, where each waited to take up the challenge of another, although the aim remained for the joust to be a one-on-one duel.

There were several types of joust, including some regional preferences or rules. For example, in 14th century Germany, distinction was made between the Hohenzeuggestech, where the aim was to break the lance, and the Scharfrennen, where knights sought to unhorse their opponents. These types called for different lances (light in the former, heavy in the latter), and saddles (where the Scharfrennen called for saddles without front or rear supports, which would impede the fall).

Jousts originally developed out of the charge at the beginning of the mêlée, but by the 13th century it had become quite distinct from the tourney. That it was seen as a separate event, with its own rules and customs, is clear from historical documents such as Edward II of England's 1309 ban of all forms of hastilude except the joust. By the nature of its duel, and the discrete space required for the action, the joust became a popular spectator and ceremonial sport, with elaborate rituals developing around the whole event.

=== Pas d'armes ===
The pas d'armes' or passage of arms was a type of chivalric hastilude that evolved in the late 14th century and remained popular through the 15th century. It involved a knight or group of knights (tenants or "holders") who would stake out a traveled spot, such as a bridge or city gate, and let it be known that any other knight who wished to pass (venans or "comers") must first fight, or be disgraced. If a traveling venant did not have weapons or horse to meet the challenge, one might be provided, and if the venant chose not to fight, he would leave his spurs behind as a sign of humiliation. If a lady passed unescorted, she would leave behind a glove or scarf, to be rescued and returned to her by a future knight who passed that way.

=== Mêlée and behourd ===
Behourd, buhurt and mêlée (the latter term being modern) refer to a class of hastiludes that involve groups of fighters simulating cavalry combat. This type of game formed the core of the tournament during the high medieval period.

=== Quintain ===
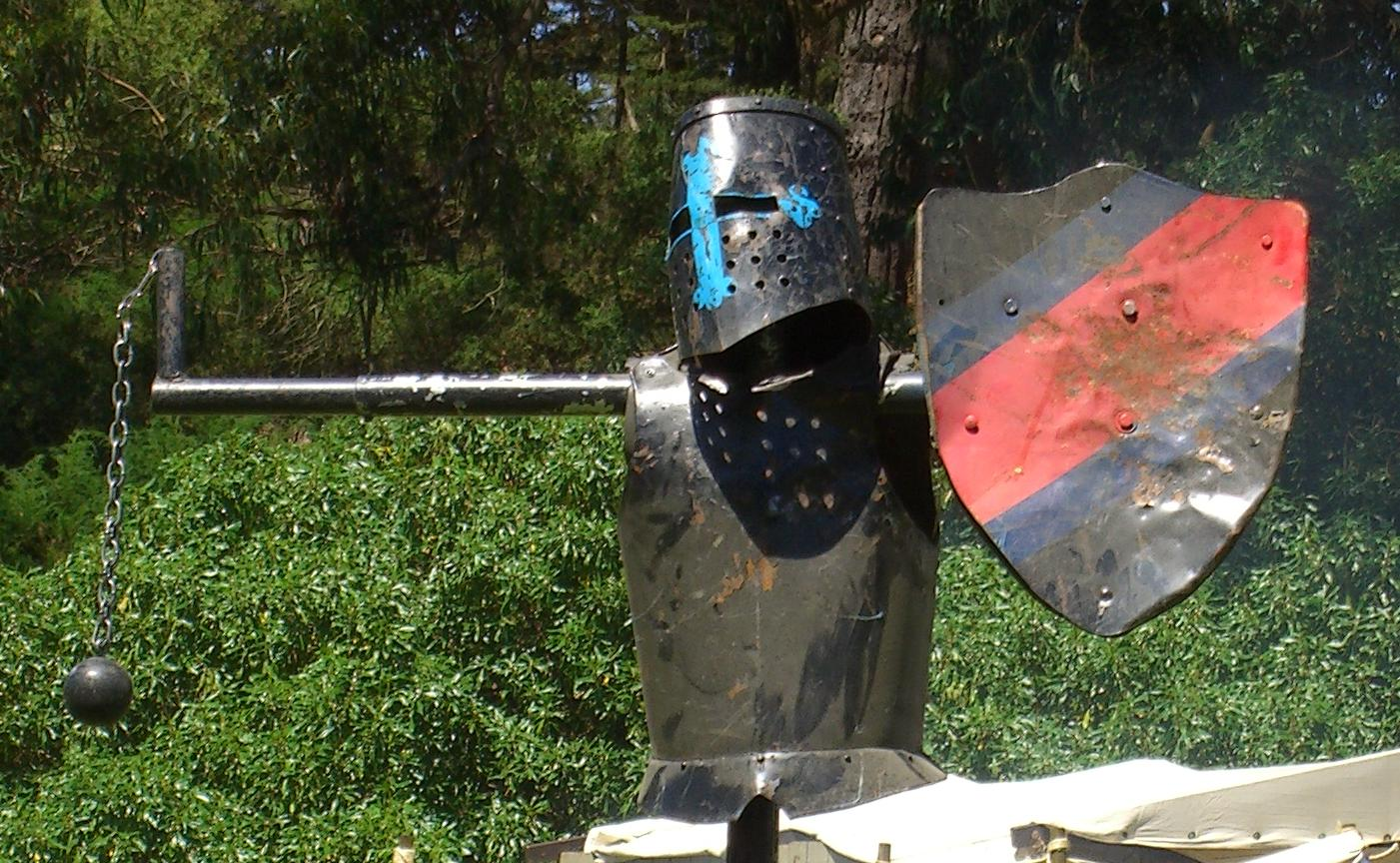
Quintain at the Golden Gate Renaissance Festival 2005

The quintain (from Latin quintana, a street between the fifth and sixth maniples of a camp, where warlike exercises took place), also known as pavo (or peacock), may have included a number of lance games, often used as training for jousting, where the competitor would attempt to strike an object with a lance. The common object was a shield or board on a pole (usually referred to, confusingly, as 'the quintain'), although a mannequin was sometimes used. While the use of horses aided in training for the joust, the game could be played on foot, using a wooden horse, or on boats (popular in 12th-century London).

=== Tupinaire ===
While frequently referred to by contemporary sources, and included (separately) in various prohibitions and declarations over the medieval period, little is known about the nature of the tupinaire. It is clearly a hastilude, or wargame, of some kind, and distinct from the other types, but there seems to be no clear description of its rules.

While the different types of hastilude used to serve as displays of skills and social prestige for the upper class, its legacy did not disappear when the medieval ages ended, instead finding new life in the modern day. This includes modern re-enactments and martial arts communities, all of which reinterpret the techniques and legacy of these games in a modern setting.

== Modern day ==
=== Modern re-enactment groups ===
Modern re-enactment groups practice hastilude and other martial arts games by wearing period accurate clothing and using historically accurate and inspired weapons during them. In these groups and events, participants recreate jousts and other mock combats, “fighting” each other in front of an audience for their amusement. These re-enactments are part of a wider tradition of historical re-enactment, which includes everything from ancient warfare to medieval tournaments.

=== HEMA ===
HEMA (Historical European Martial Arts) is a cross-disciplinary sparring event which emphasizes skill over spectacle. It is an attempt to revive the martial arts traditions that were present in Europe from the 1300s to 1800s, complete with authentic weapons including the longsword, rapier and short sword. HEMA is distinctly different from staged fencing and other LARP swordplay as it combines historical scholarly work with practical training.

=== Renaissance fairs ===
Renaissance fairs are immersive outdoor gatherings designed to educate and immerse the participants in the bygone era of Medieval Europe. These gatherings include performers and attendees wearing period accurate clothing, consuming traditional foods and drinks and engaging in theatrical performances, the most common of which being jousting. These jousts include knights on horseback, striking each other with lances in front of a large audience. It is among the most common forms of representation for hastilude and medieval fighting as a whole. While the different types of hastilude used to serve as displays of skills and social prestige for the upper class, its legacy did not disappear when the medieval ages ended, instead finding new life in the modern day. This includes modern re-enactments and martial arts communities, all of which reinterpret the techniques and legacy of these games in a modern setting.
