= Great Stirrup Controversy =

Debate of the effect of the stirrup

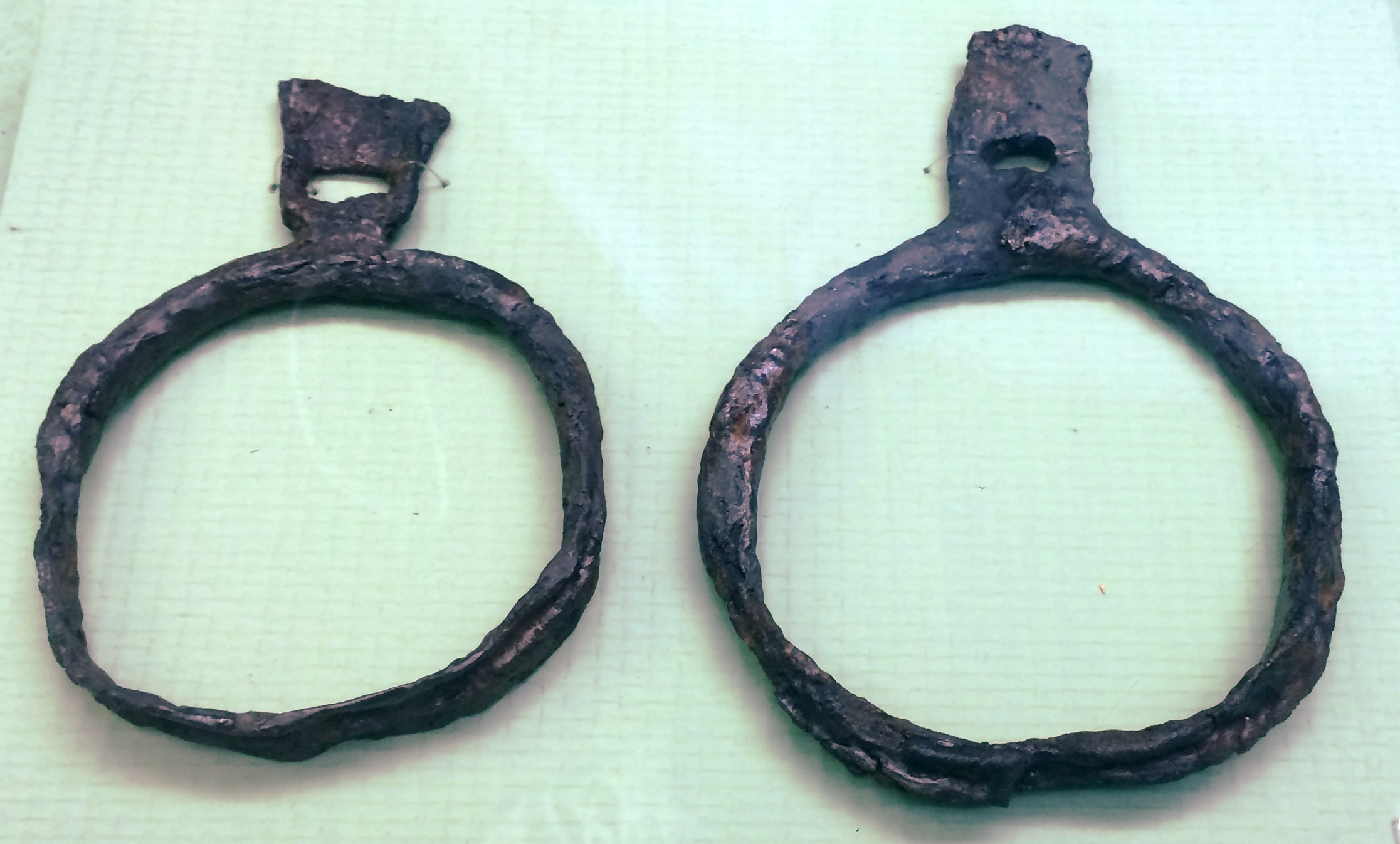
Avar stirrups from 7–8th century Hungary.

The Great Stirrup Controversy is the academic debate about the Stirrup Thesis, the theory that feudalism in Europe developed largely as a result of the introduction of the stirrup to cavalry in the 8th century AD. It relates to the hypothesis suggested by Lynn Townsend White Jr. in his 1962 book, Medieval Technology and Social Change. White believed that the stirrup enabled heavy cavalry and shock combat, which in turn prompted the Carolingian dynasty of the 8th and 9th centuries to organize its territory into a vassalage system, rewarding mounted warriors with land grants for their service.

White's book has proved very influential, but others have accused him of speculation, oversimplification, and ignoring contradictory evidence on the subject. Scholars have debated whether the stirrup actually provided the impetus for this social change, or whether the rise of heavy cavalry resulted from political changes in medieval Europe.

== White's hypothesis ==
The earliest forms of the stirrup are found in China. White traces the transmission of the stirrup to Europe as an example of the diffusion of technology. The research of the 19th century German historian Heinrich Brunner claimed that the switch to mounted warfare occurred after the Battle of Tours with a Saracen army in 732. Brunner pointed out that Pepin the Short began demanding horses as tribute from the Saxons in 758, citing this as evidence of an increasingly cavalry-dependent army. Brunner also claimed that the Muslim incursion into Europe prompted Charles Martel to confiscate church lands to support cavalry.

White used linguistic changes and evidence of a drastic change in weapons to support his claim that this change to mounted shock combat occurred in the early 8th century. He claimed that the francisca (Frankish throwing ax) was replaced by longswords and lances—weapons designed to be used from horseback. The lance, White says, is the strongest evidence that the Franks had adopted the stirrup by this time. He further claimed: "The feudal class of the European Middle Ages existed to be armed horsemen, cavaliers fighting in a particular manner which was made possible by the stirrup." He believed that the stirrup had enabled the knight to exist.

== Criticisms of White's ideas ==
Despite the great influence of White's book, his ideas of technological determinism were met with criticism in the following decades. It is agreed that cavalry replaced infantry in Carolingian France as the preferred mode of combat around the same time that feudalism emerged in that area, but whether this shift to cavalry was caused by the introduction of the stirrup is a contentious issue among historians. It has been asserted that armored cavalry were used successfully without stirrups before their introduction, and that the transition to cavalry was not a result of new technologies. The first fully armoured cataphracts appeared in the third century BC, almost 1000 years before the Carolingian dynasty. White argued that they were "essentially armoured bowmen."

=== Sawyer and Hilton's critique ===
In an April 1963 review of White's book, the scholars Peter Sawyer, of the University of Birmingham, and Rodney Hilton, were quick to point out that "the most serious weakness in this argument is that the introduction of the stirrup is not in itself an adequate explanation for any changes that may have occurred. The stirrup made new methods possible, not inevitable ... the stirrup cannot alone explain the changes that it made possible."

=== Stephen Morillo's argument ===
Military historian Stephen Morillo, of Wabash College, offered a different explanation for the rise of cavalry in medieval warfare: that of a lack of centralized government. Morillo contends that cavalry-dependent militaries are common in societies that do not have strong central governments, and cites Medieval Japan and China as analogous examples to 8th century Europe. A central government, he explains, is crucial to the development of a highly trained infantry, but cavalry can be maintained, however loosely, by an already horse-owning noble class. He writes: "Rural warrior elites were in fact a common feature of many traditional civilizations. Sons of such classes were raised to the military lifestyle, trained in small groups built from the social connections among the class, and exercised military force in the interest of maintaining their own position in the hierarchy of power." Furthermore, Morillo examines cases of Frankish warriors fighting on foot—and defeating mounted knights in the process. Even White quoted Brunner as admitting that a good infantry could break a cavalry charge if its soldiers held their ranks.

== See also ==
- Horses in the Middle Ages
- Horses in warfare
- Horse tack
