= Courser (horse) =

Type of warhorse

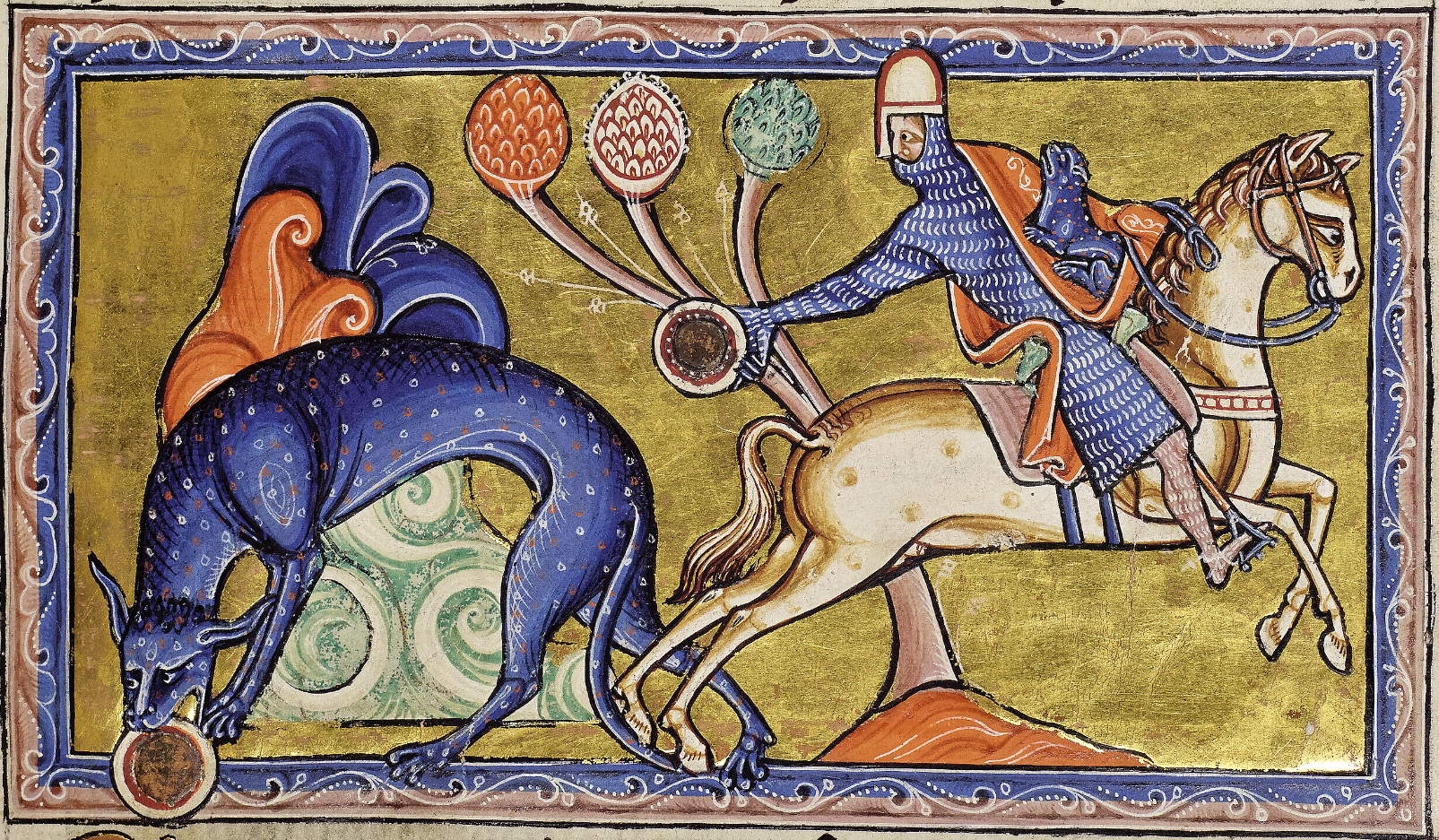
This 12th century depiction of a knight on horseback might show a courser.

A courser is a swift and strong horse, frequently used during the Middle Ages as a warhorse. It was ridden by knights and men-at-arms.

== Etymology ==
Coursers are commonly believed to be named for their running gait, (from Old French cours, 'to run'). However, the word possibly derived from the Italian corsiero, meaning 'battle horse'.

== Coursers in warfare ==
Coursers, occurring more commonly than destriers, were used in battle, as they were light, fast and strong. They were valuable horses, but less expensive than the highly prized destriers. Another horse commonly ridden during war was the rouncey, an all-purpose horse.

== Other uses ==
Coursers were also used occasionally for hunting.

== See also ==
- Horses in the Middle Ages
