= Horse transports in the Middle Ages =

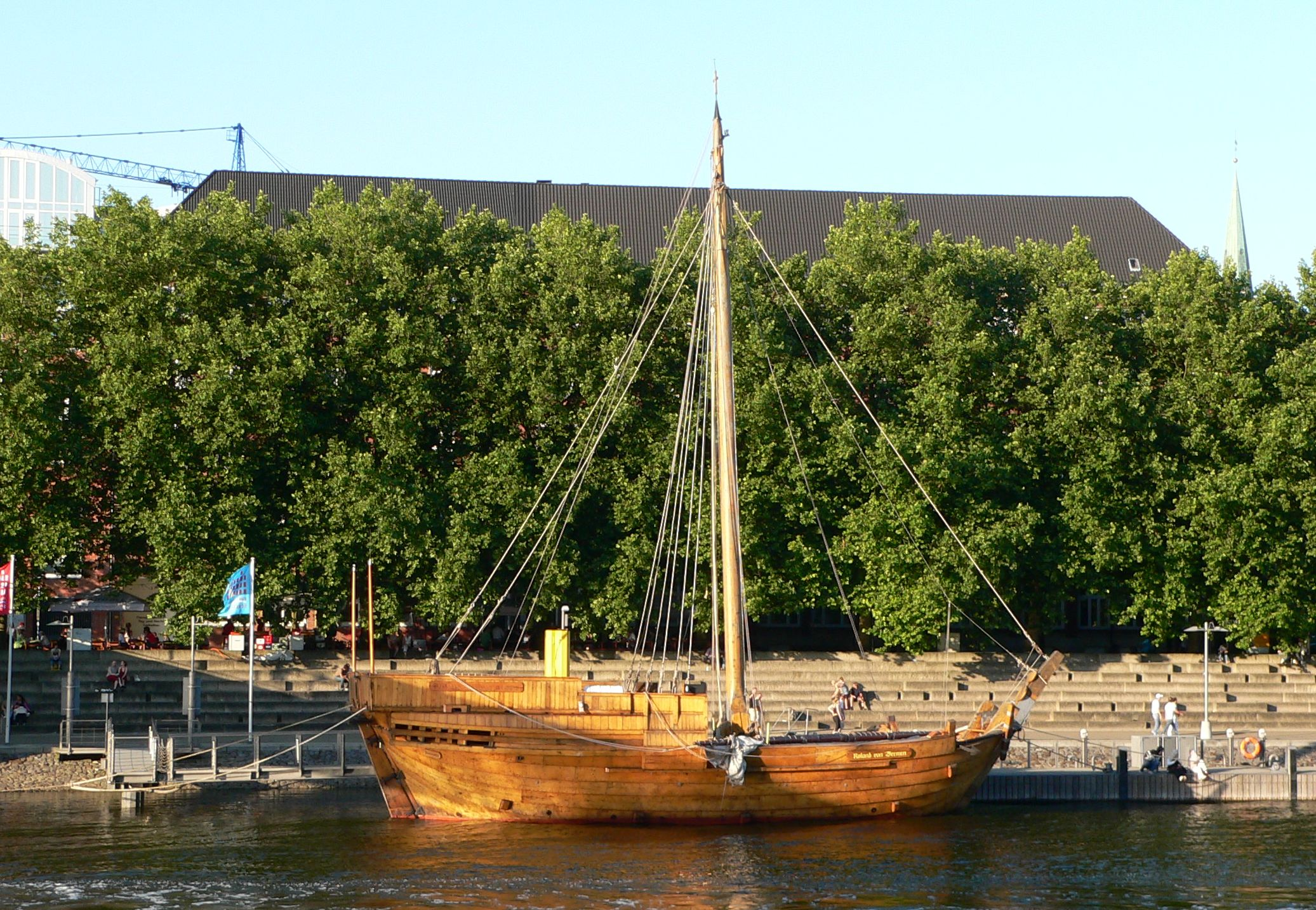
Cogs were the main transport vessels of Northern Europe.

In the Middle Ages, boats were used to transport horses over long distances, both for war and for trade. They can be found from the Early Middle Ages, in Celtic, Germanic and Mediterranean traditions.

== Military shipment of horses ==
=== The Mediterranean World ===
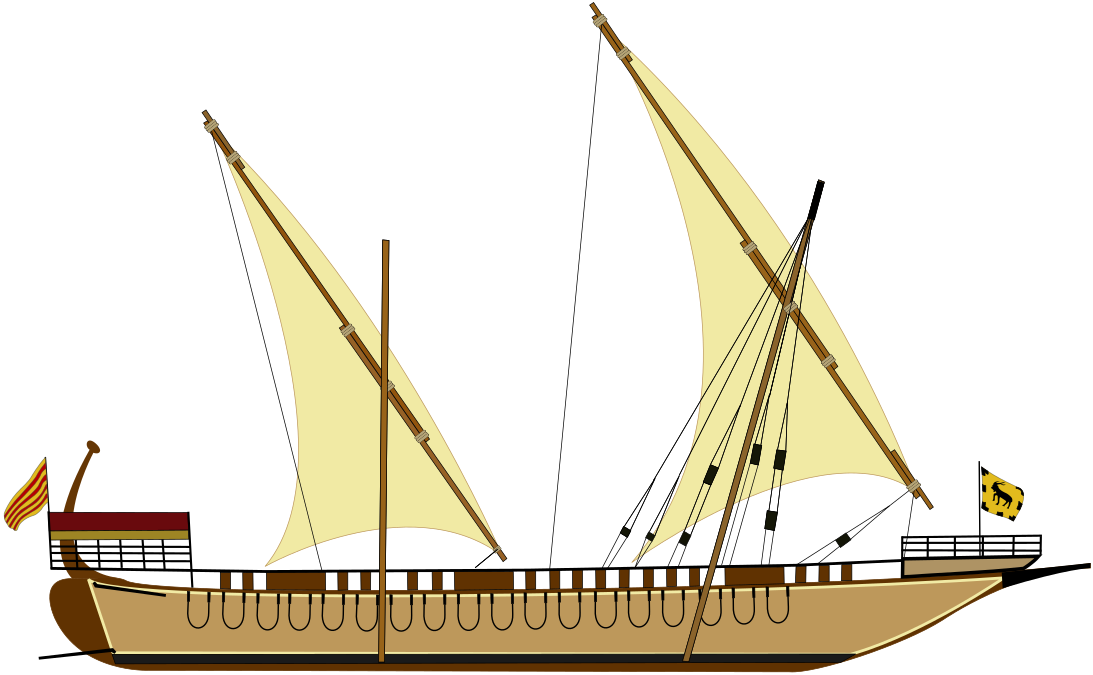
Side view of the Catalan tarida Sant Pere de Roma. Used during the 14th century, she was able to carry 15 to 20 horses.

The Romans had developed efficient methods of sea transport for horses, which were improved by the Arabic nations in the Early Middle Ages; these transports became common in Europe from the tenth century. Horse transports could be powered by oars, or sometimes by sail.

The oared tarida was able to be loaded and unloaded directly on a beach, using doors as loading ramps. In 1174 an Italo-Norman force attacked Alexandria with 1,500 horses transported on 36 tarides. Detailed specifications for thirteenth century tarides exist, showing they could carry 20 to 30 horses. In Angevin tarides, horses were stalled in threes, supported by canvas slings. Genoese tarides in 1246 carried 150 water butts containing 39,750 litres in total.

Sailing transports, known as usciere in Italian (French huissiers; Latin usserii), were also built. These had two decks and could carry up to 100 horses. The horses were loaded through openings in the hull, which were then sealed for the voyage. Venetian usciere built for Louis IX in 1268 were 25.76 m long, had a beam of 6.1 m, had two decks and two masts.

=== Northern Europe ===
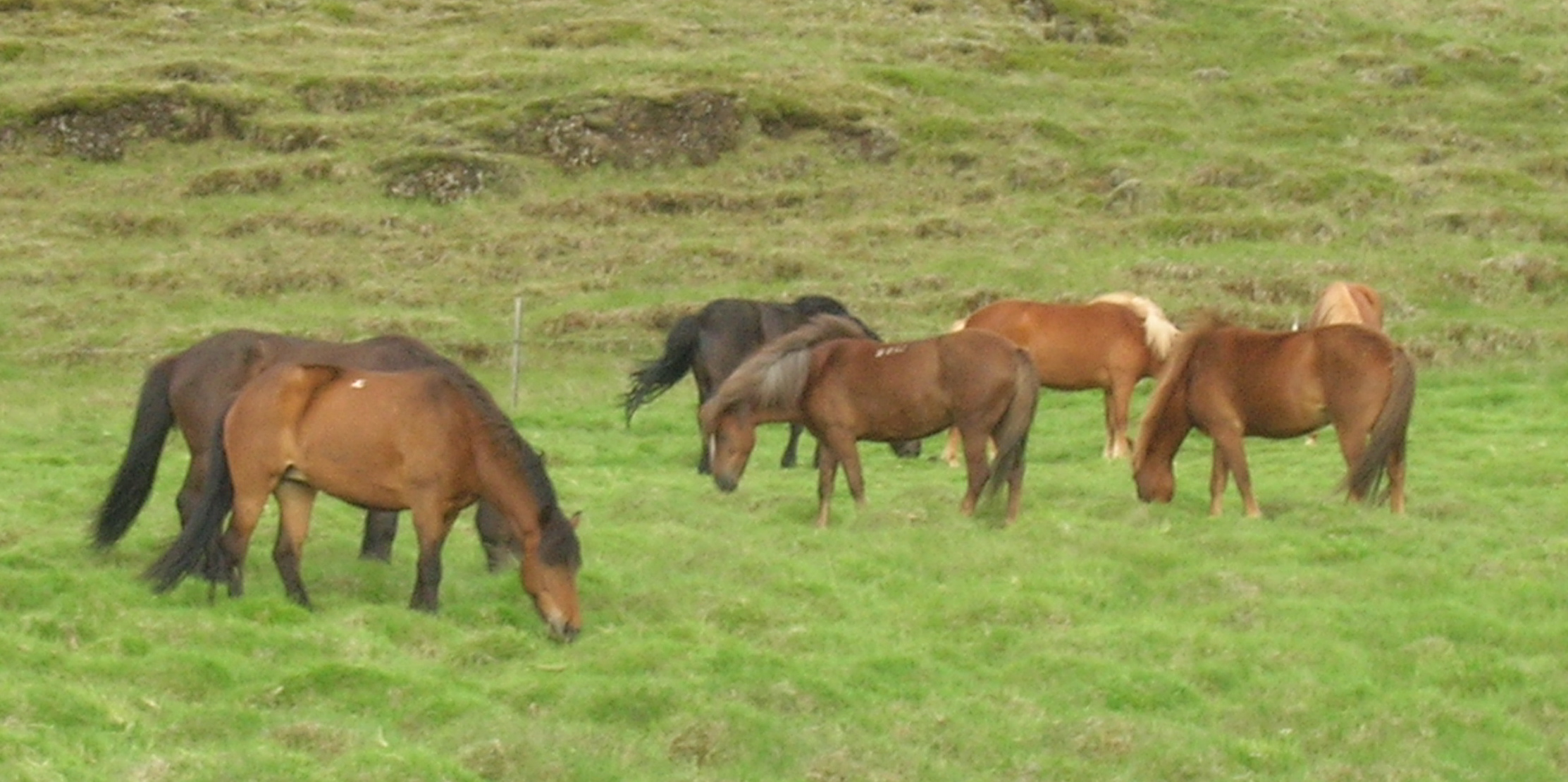
Icelandic horses were transported by Norse ships to Iceland by settlers in the 9th century.

Records of cavalry transportation abound throughout the period, reflecting the changes in warfare. For example, the Scandinavians had adapted the horse-transport technology by the 12th century as part of their move away from the traditional Viking infantry. The first illustration displaying such horse-transport in western Europe can be found in the Bayeux Tapestry's depiction of the Norman conquest of England. This particular military venture required the transfer of over 2,000 horses from Normandy. Scholars have linked the successful use of horse transports during the Norman conquest of England to Norman interactions with Byzantines (who had mastered horse transportation in amphibious operations) in Southern Italy in the 11th century.

The small size of many transport vessels available and the need to carry fodder and water on all but the shortest journeys restricted the number of horses that could be carried. Records from the 13th century show a range from 8 to 20 horses. In 1303 ships transporting horses between Scotland and Ireland carried between 10 and 32 animals.

Adapting a ship for horse transportation required the installation of stalls of wood or hurdles. Detailed records of the fitting of an English fleet of 1340 show the creation of 418 hurdles, 413 iron rings and staples, canvas mangers and the creation of four gangways for loading 30 feet long by 5 wide. Similar records from 1338 show 47 ships were equipped with 134 tuns to carry water for horses. Whether English vessels used canvas slings to support the horses like contemporary Mediterranean practice is uncertain. Military historian Michael Prestwich speculates they did and he is supported by naval historian Ian Friel, who believes that the references to canvas mangers referred to above should actually be translated as canvas slings.

== Shipping horses for trade ==
The development and building of horse transports for use in war meant it remained easy to transfer horses for breeding and purchase during peacetime. After William of Normandy's successful conquest of England, he continued to bring horses across from Normandy for breeding purposes, improving the bloodstock of the English horses. By the time of the Hundred Years' War, the English government banned the export of horses in times of crisis.

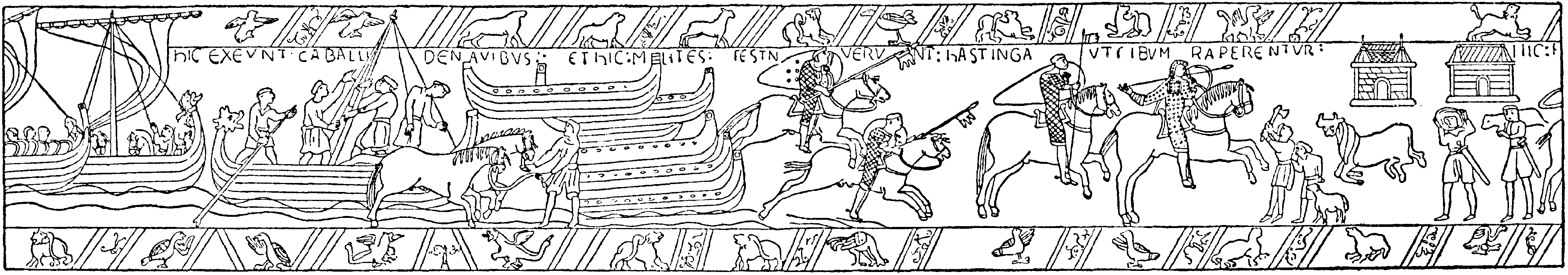
This section from the Bayeux Tapestry shows horses being unloaded during William the Conqueror's invasion of England in 1066. He brought over 2,000 horses with him across the Channel.

== See also ==
- Medieval ships
- Horses in the Middle Ages
