= Destrier =

Type of war horse

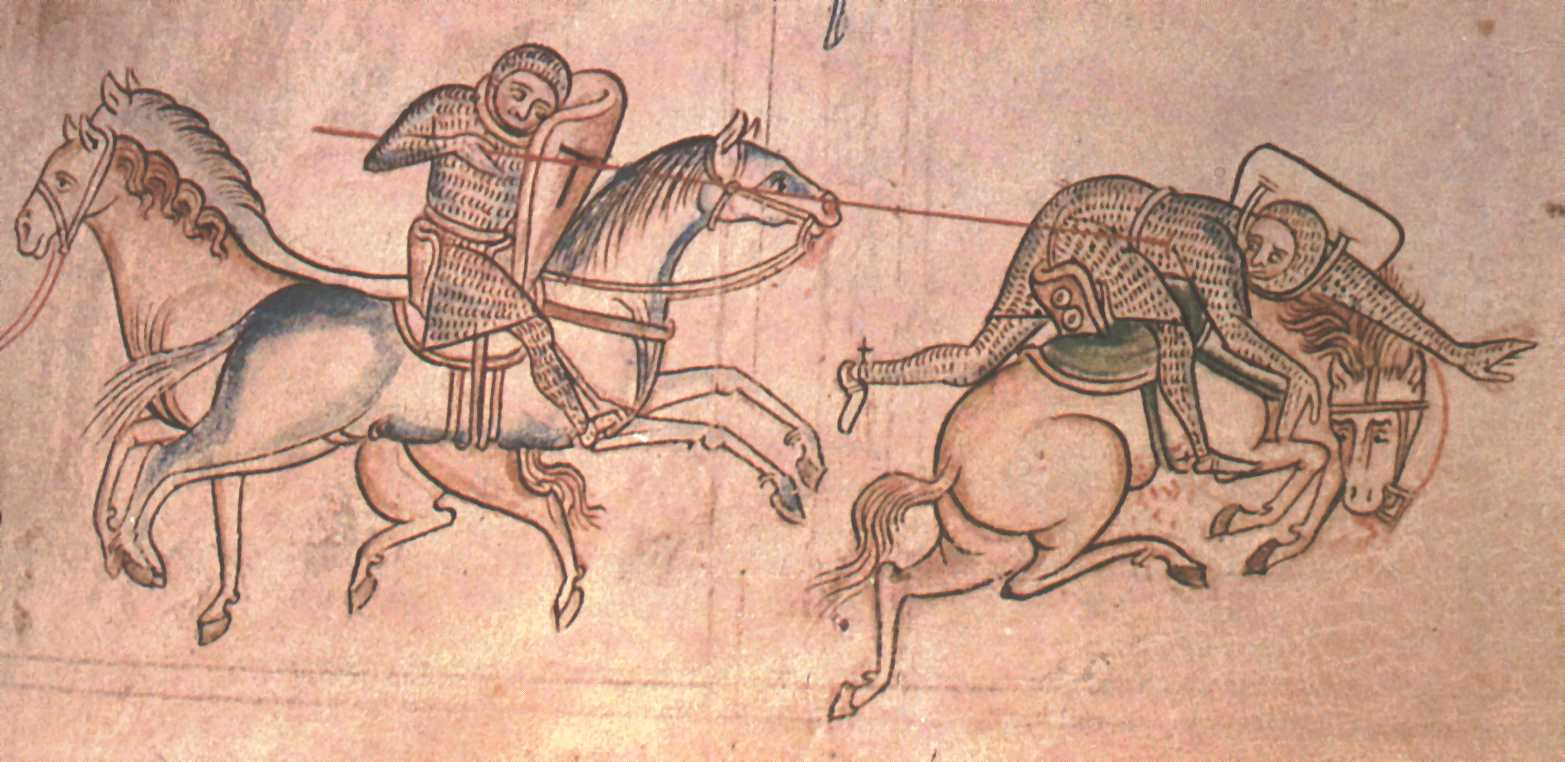
Mounted on a destrier, Richard Marshal unseats an opponent during a skirmish.

The destrier is the best-known war horse of the Middle Ages. It carried knights in battles, tournaments, and jousts. It was described by contemporary sources as the Great Horse, due to its significance.

While highly prized by knights and men-at-arms, the destrier was not very common. Most knights and mounted men-at-arms rode other war horses, such as coursers and rounceys.

== Etymology ==
The word is first attested in Middle English around 1330, as destrer. It was borrowed into Middle English from Anglo-Norman destrer, whose Old French counterpart was destrier (from which the Modern English spelling derives). The word is also found in medieval Provençal (as destrier) and Italian (as destriere, destriero). These forms themselves derived from the Vulgar Latin equus dextrarius, meaning "right-sided horse" (from dextra, "right hand", the same root as dextrous and dexterity). This may refer to it being led by the squire at the knight's right side, as often before battle the destrier ran unburdened to keep it fresh for the fray; the knight rode another horse, mounting his destrier just before engaging the enemy. Alternatively, it could describe the horse's gait (leading with the right).

== Characteristics ==
The word destrier does not refer to a breed of horse, but to a type of horse; the finest and strongest warhorses. These horses were usually stallions, bred and raised from foalhood specifically for the needs of war. The destrier was specifically raised for use in battle or tournament. For everyday riding, a knight would use a palfrey, and his baggage would be carried on a sumpter horse (or packhorse), or possibly in wagons.

They had powerful hindquarters, able to easily coil and spring to a stop, spin, turn or sprint forward quickly. They also had a short back and well-muscled loin, strong bone, and a well-arched neck. From medieval art, the head of the destrier appears to have had a straight or slightly convex profile, a strong, wide jaw, and good width between the eyes.

The destrier was considered the most suited to the joust: coursers seem to have been preferred for other forms of warfare.

== Breeding and size ==
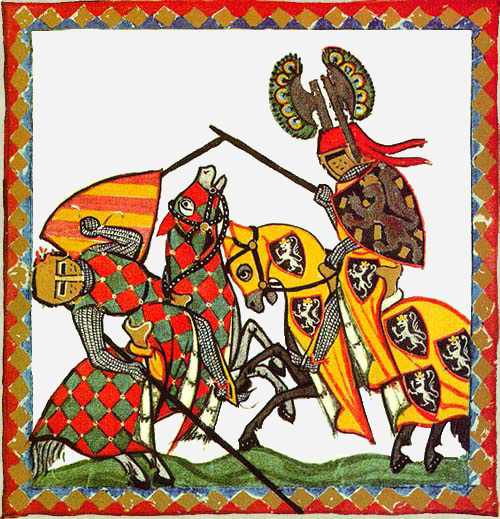
Caparisoned horses competing in a joust from the Codex Manesse

Many well-known scholars have speculated about the nature of destriers and about the size they attained. They apparently were not enormous draft types. Recent research undertaken at the Museum of London, using literary, pictorial and archeological sources, suggests war horses (including destriers) averaged from 14 to 15 hands (56 to 60 inches, 142 to 152 cm), and differed from a riding horse in their strength, musculature and training, rather than in their size. An analysis of medieval horse armour located in the Royal Armouries indicates the equipment was originally worn by horses of 15 to 16 hands (60 to 64 inches, 152 to 163 cm), about the size and build of a modern field hunter or ordinary riding horse.

Modern estimates put the height of a destrier at no more than 16 hands (64 inches, 163 cm), but with a strong and heavy physique. Though the term "Great Horse" was used to describe the destrier, leading some historians to speculate that such animals were the forerunners of modern draught horse breeds, the historical record does not support the image of the destrier as a draft horse.

== Descendants and reproductions ==
The modern Percheron draft breed may in part descend from destriers, though it is probably taller and heavier than the average destrier. Other draft breeds such as the Shire claim destrier ancestry, though proof is less certain.

Modern attempts to reproduce the destrier type usually involve crossing an athletic riding horse with a light draft type. Outcomes of such attempts include crossbreds such as the "Spanish-Norman", a cross between the Percheron and the Andalusian; and the Warlander, a cross between the Andalusian and the Friesian horse.

== Value ==
A good destrier was very costly: at the times of the Crusades, a fine destrier was valued at seven or eight times the cost of an ordinary horse. In England, the specific sum of eighty pounds (in this context a pound was 240 silver pennies, which amounted to one pound of silver by weight) was noted at the end of the thirteenth century. During the important military campaigns of King Edward III in the middle of the fourteenth century, the increased demand for warhorses brought about considerable price inflation: in 1339 William de Bohun, 1st Earl of Northampton lost a destrier valued at one hundred pounds while on campaign in Flanders. Army muster rolls included detailed inventories of the warriors' horses: fewer than 5% of the warhorses were classified as destriers, owned only by a small elite of the wealthiest knights. However, because of destriers' relative scarcity and consequent infrequent sale and purchase, reliable price information for the period has not often survived.

== See also ==
- Žemaitukas
