= Medieval ships =

European vessels from the Middle Ages

Medieval ships were the vessels used in Europe during the Middle Ages. Like ships from antiquity, they were moved by sails, oars, or a combination of the two. There was a large variety, mostly based on much older, conservative designs. Although wider and more frequent communications within Europe meant exposure to a variety of improvements, experimental failures were costly and rarely attempted. Ships in the north were influenced by Viking vessels, while those in the south by classical or Roman vessels. However, there was technological change. The different traditions used different construction methods; clinker in the north, carvel in the south. By the end of the period, carvel construction would come to dominate the building of large ships. The period would also see a shift from the steering oar or side rudder to the stern rudder and the development from single-masted to multi-masted ships. As the area is connected by water, people in the Mediterranean built different kinds of ships to accommodate different sea levels and climates. Within the Mediterranean area during the Medieval times ships were used for a multitude of reasons, such as war, trade, and exploration.

== Sailing ships ==
=== Early Middle Ages ===
==== Knarr ====
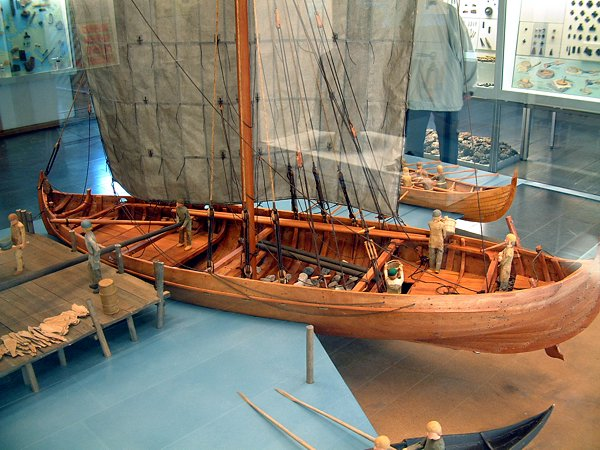
Model of a knarr

The knarr, a relative of the longship, was a type of cargo vessel used by the Vikings. It differed from the longship in that it was larger and relied almost entirely on its square-rigged sail for propulsion.

=== High Middle Ages ===
==== Cog ====
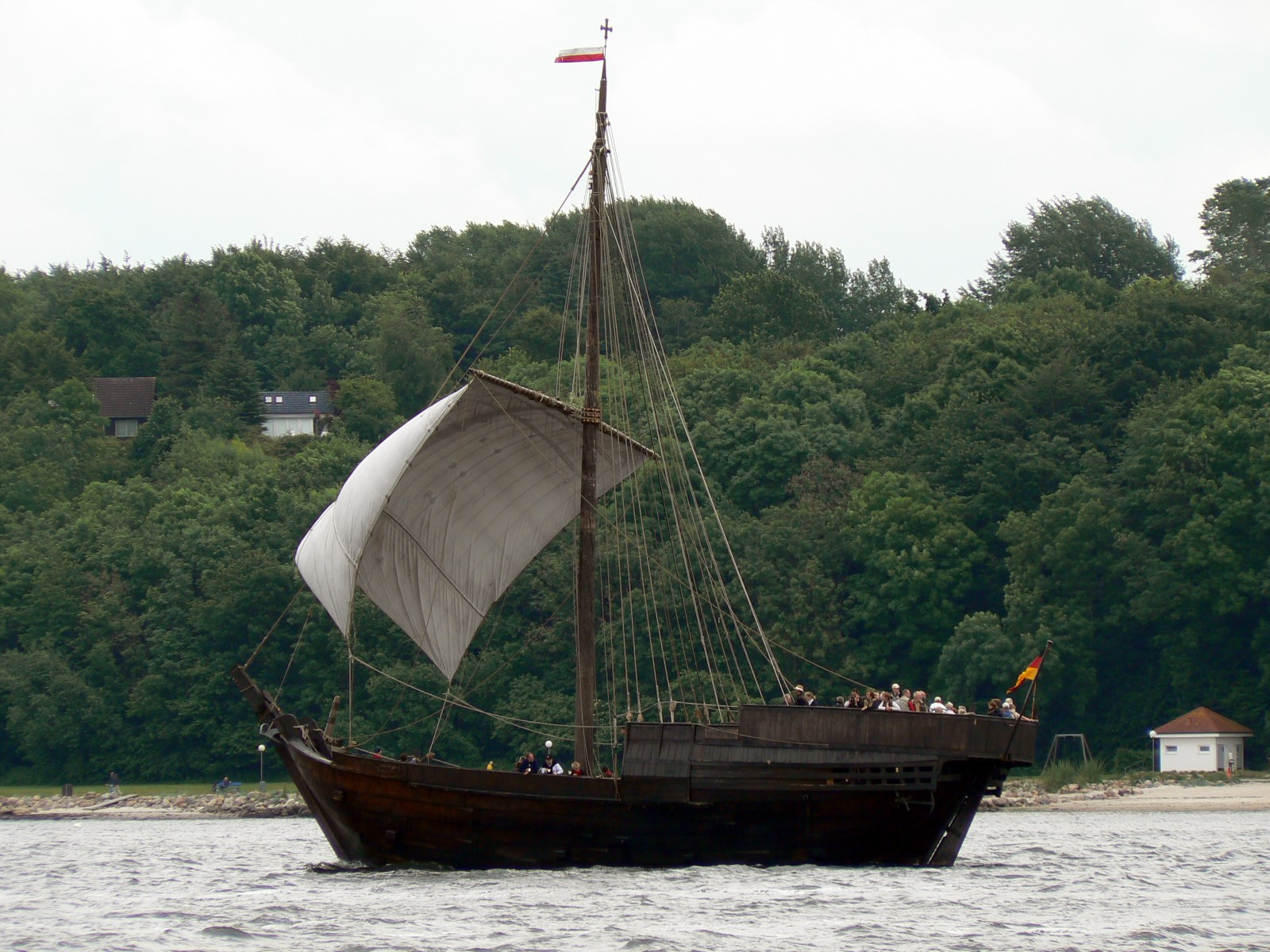
A cog

Cogs were single-masted vessels, with clinker-built sides and a flush-planked, flat bottom

Although the name "cog" is recorded as early as the 9th century, the seagoing vessel of that name seems to have evolved on the Frisian coast during the 14th century. Cogs progressively replaced Viking-type ships in Northern waters during the 13th century. Why this was the case is uncertain but cogs could carry more cargo than knarr of a similar size. Their flat bottoms allowed them to settle flat in the harbor, making them easier to load and unload. Their high sides made them more difficult to board in a sea-fight, which may have made them safer from pirates.

Cogs were also used as military transports and warships, fitted with towers fore and aft.

The cog traditionally reached the Mediterranean in 1304. This led to a Mediterranean variant, the coach.

==== Hulk ====
The hulk (OE: hulc) is first recorded in the 10th century, when it is distinguished from a keel (OE: ceol), a ship in the Nordic tradition such as the knarr. Very little is known about the hulc, with no archaeological remains or usefully descriptive contemporary records. Early images of hulks show them strongly curved upwards at stem and stern.

Hulks continued to be mentioned in use throughout the Middle Ages and into the 16th century when it is particularly associated with the Baltic and the Hanseatic League. These late hulks could be as large as contemporary great ships. Jesus of Lübeck of 1544 was a ship of 700 long tons (780 short tons; 710 t), the same as the Mary Rose. However, how similar later medieval hulks were to their ancestors is unknown. There is some evidence of hybridization with the cog form, showing both hulk and post-construction. Others have suggested that late hulks were partially carvel-built.

=== Late Middle Ages ===
==== Caravel ====
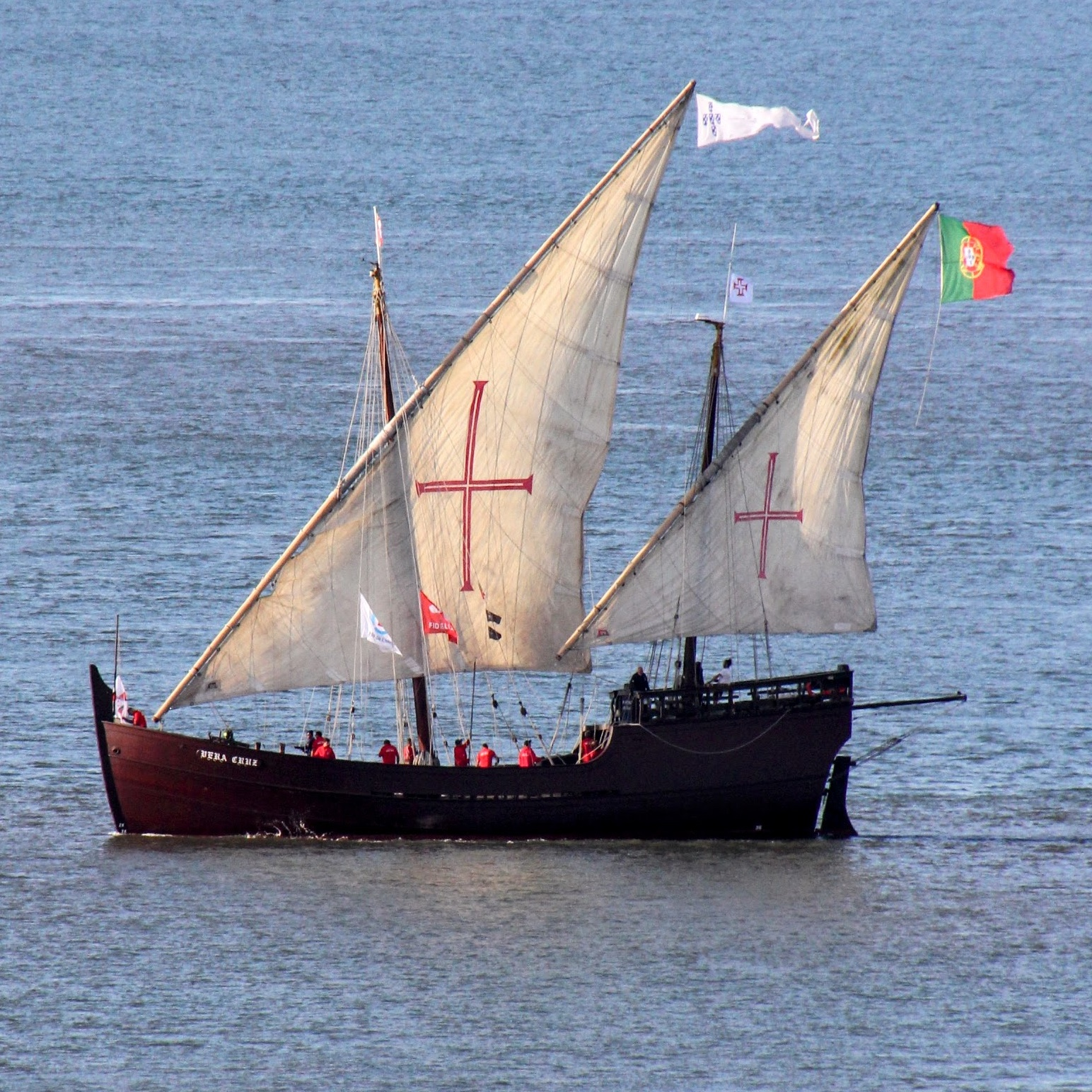
Caravela Latina / Lateen-rigged caravel

The caravel was a ship developed by the Portuguese in the 13th century, being used for fishing and cargo work. It was well suited to some of the exploration activity in the Age of Discovery and was used from about 1440 in this activity. Unlike the longship and cog, it used a carvel method of construction. In contrast to some contemporary Mediterranean ship types, caravels had a rudder mounted on the sternpost, as opposed to using a side-mounted steering oar. It could be either square rigged and lateen rigged (Caravela Redonda) or only lateen rigged (Caravela Latina), as is found in earlier examples. The most famous examples of caravels were the Niña and the Pinta. The caravel became increasingly common in Northern European waters from the 1430s and the spread of this one type of vessel meant that carvel construction had to be learnt in the shipyards outside the Iberia.

==== Carrack ====
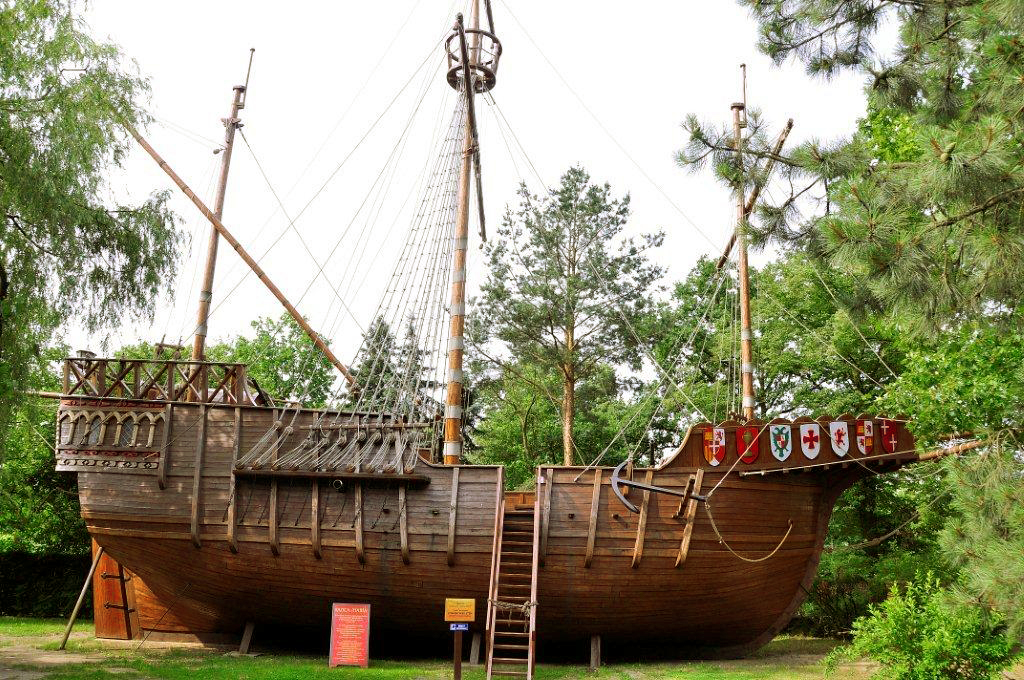
A replica of the Santa María, the famous carrack of Christopher Columbus.

The carrack was a ship type invented in southern Europe in the 15th century and particularly developed in Portugal in the same century. It was a larger vessel than the caravel. Columbus's flagship, the Santa María, was a famous example of a carrack. The ships commanded by Vasco da Gama as the São Gabriel, with six sails, a bowsprit, foresail, mizzen, spritsail and two topsails, already had the complete features and the design of the typical carrack.

An example of a Northern European late medieval vessel with many characteristics of a carrack is the Danish-Norwegian flagship of King Hans, Gribshunden, which sank off modern-day Sweden in June 1495. It was probably built in the Low Countries near modern-day Rotterdam in 1485, from timber cut in the River Meuse watershed of the Ardennes forest. Archaeological excavation shows its carvel-built hull carried three masts, and featured a forecastle and lapstrake stern castle. With a keel length of about 25.5 meters and an overall length in excess of 30 meters, it was a large ship for the time, especially in the Baltic Sea. It served not only as a warship armed with as many as 68 artillery pieces, but as a mobile castle to serve all of the king's needs as he traveled throughout his realm.

==== Small vessels ====
A number of smaller vessels are named in English sources of the Late Middle Ages, some of which continued into the 16th century and beyond.

===== Crayer =====
A vessel of 20-50 tons, used largely on cross-channel trade.

===== Hoy =====
The hoy originated in Flanders in the 15th century. A single-masted vessel usually of 25–80 long tons (28–90 short tons; 25–81 t) used a coaster or on short sea routes, as well as a lighter. The type would evolve in the 16th and 17th, only finally disappearing in the early 19th century.

===== Picard =====
First recorded in the 1320s, the picard was a single-masted vessel of 10–40 tons used mainly as support vessel for fishing fleets, bringing home their catches and ferrying supplies, or as a lighter, loading from vessels at anchor and discharging onto beaches or shallow creeks. A widespread type, in use from Scotland, all round the English coast and across in Ireland.

== Oared ships ==
=== Galley ===
Galleys had been in use for trade and warfare since at least the 8th century BC and remained in use throughout the Middle Ages. Rowing was the primary method of propulsion, which was well-suited for often-fickle winds of the Mediterranean where they were primarily used. The galley was also used in the waters of Northern Europe, but to a lesser extent since its low freeboard and lack of stability in rough seas made it vulnerable. During the years 1150-1350, after the Second Crusade, the Mediterranean witnessed an economic boom known as the Commercial Revolution. To keep up with trade, ship building increased as well. Italian city-states like Venice constructed ships like the galley. By the thirteenth century there were galleys that could carry up to 500 metric tons (490 long tons; 550 short tons) of cargo and was about 40 metres (130 ft) long.

=== Longship ===
The longship was a type of ship that was developed over a period of centuries and perfected by its most famous user, the Vikings, in approximately the 9th century. The ships were clinker-built, utilizing overlapping wooden strakes.

=== Balinger ===
The balinger was a clinker-built oared vessel, initially with a single mast, but in the 15th century larger vessels had a second mast. They were usually small vessels of 40–60 long tons (45–67 short tons; 41–61 t) but larger vessels of up to 120 long tons (130 short tons; 120 t) are recorded. Balingers were popular in the Bay of Biscay and English Channel and were used both for trade and warfare. Fast and with the flexibility of oars and sails for propulsion, they were commonly used by pirates.

=== Birlinn ===
In the waters off the west of Scotland between 1263 and 1500, the Lords of the Isles used galleys both for warfare and for transport around their maritime domain, which included the west coast of the Scottish Highlands, the Hebrides, and Antrim in Ireland. They employed these ships for sea-battles and for attacking castles or forts built close to the sea. As a feudal superior, the Lord of the Isles required the service of a specified number and size of galleys from each holding of land. For examples the Isle of Man had to provide six galleys of 26 oars, and Sleat in Skye had to provide one 18-oar galley.

Carvings of galleys on tombstones from 1350 onward show the construction of these ships. From the 14th century they abandoned a steering-oar in favour of a stern rudder, with a straight stern to suit. From a document of 1624, a galley proper would have 18 to 24 oars, a birlinn 12 to 18 oars and a lymphad fewer still.

== See also ==
- Horse transports in the Middle Ages
- Byzantine navy

== General references ==
- Bass, George F. 1972. A History of Seafaring: Based on Underwater Archaeology . Thames and Hudson Ltd, ISBN 0-500-01077-3
- Crumlin-Pedersen, O. (2000). "To be or not to be a cog: the Bremen Cog in Perspective". International Journal of Nautical Archaeology 29.2: pp. 230–246
- Davies, Jonathan (2005). The King's Ships. Leigh-on-Sea, Essex: Partizan Press. ISBN 1-85818-547-5.
- Friel, Ian (1995). The Good Ship. London: British Museum Press. ISBN 0-7141-0574-0.
- McGowan, Alan (1981). Tiller and Whipstaff:The development of the Sailing Ship 1400-1700. London: National maritime Museum. ISBN 0-11-290313-4.
- McGrail, Sean (1981). Rafts, Boats and Ships. London: National Maritime Museum. ISBN 0-11-290312-6.
- Rose, Susan (2013). England's Medieval Navy 1066-1509. Montreal & Kingston: McGill-Queen's University Press. ISBN 978-0-7735-4322-5.
- O'Connell, Monique; Dursteler, Eric R. (2016). The Mediterranean world: from the fall of Rome to the rise of Napoleon. Johns Hopkins University Press. p. 133. ISBN 978-1-4214-1901-5. OCLC 1047614281.
