= Medieval warfare =

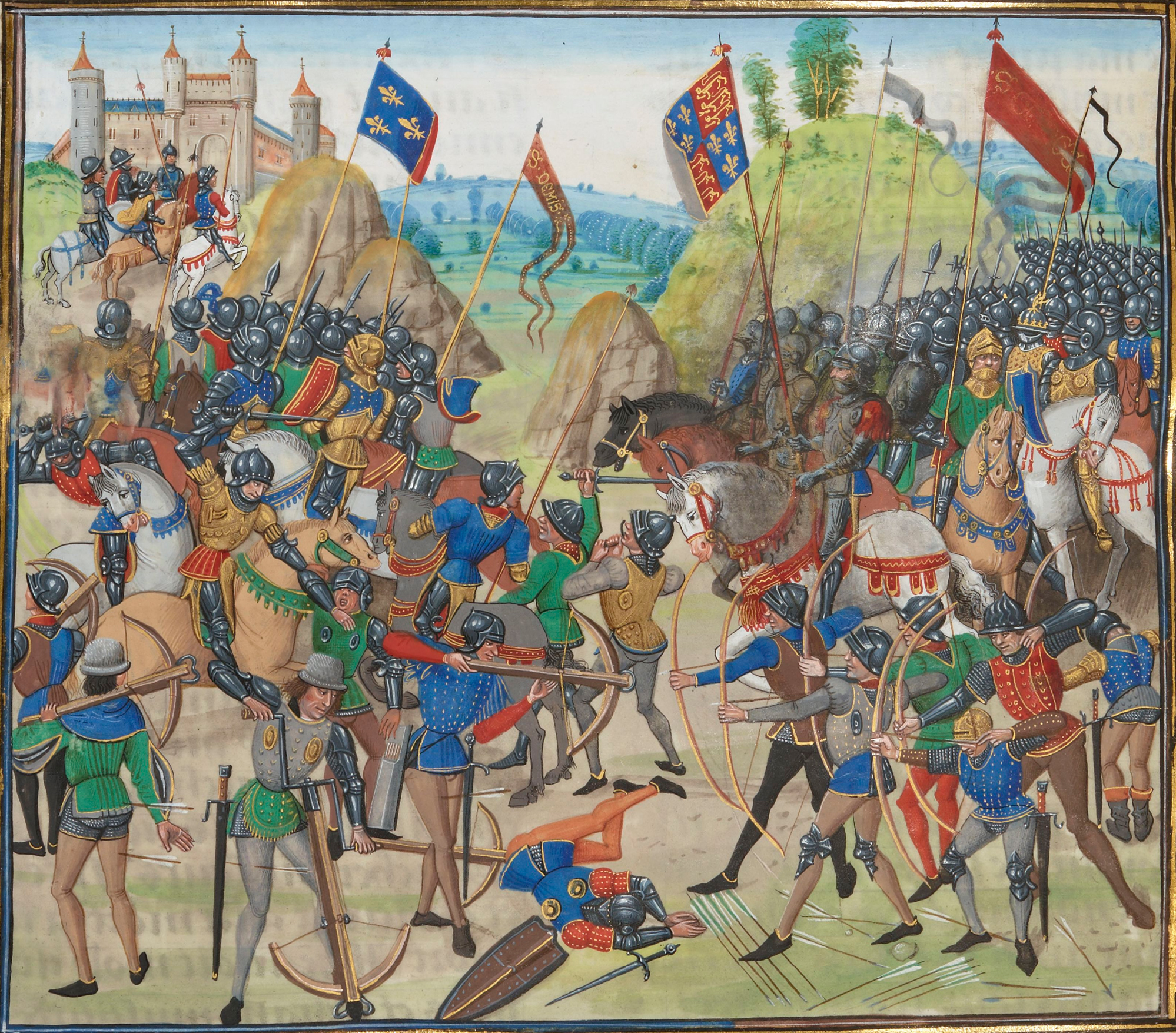
The Battle of Crécy (1346) between the English and the French in the Hundred Years' War.

Medieval warfare is the warfare of the Post-classical period and Middle Ages. Technological, cultural, and social advancements had forced a severe transformation in the character of warfare from antiquity, changing military tactics and the role of cavalry and artillery (see military history). In terms of fortification, the Middle Ages saw the emergence of the castle in Europe, which then spread to the Holy Land (modern day Israel and Palestine).

== Organization ==
The medieval knight was usually a mounted and armoured soldier, often connected with nobility or royalty, although (especially in north-eastern Europe) knights could also come from the lower classes, and could even be enslaved persons. The cost of their armour, horses, and weapons was great; this, among other things, helped gradually transform the knight, at least in western Europe, into a distinct social class separate from other warriors. During the crusades, holy orders of Knights fought in the Holy Land (see Knights Templar, the Hospitallers, etc.).

The light cavalry consisted usually of lighter armed and armoured men, who could have lances, javelins or missile weapons, such as bows or crossbows. In much of the Middle Ages, light cavalry usually consisted of wealthy commoners. Later in the Middle Ages, light cavalry would also include sergeants who were men who had trained as knights but could not afford the costs associated with the title. Light cavalry was used as scouts, skirmishers or outflankers. Many countries developed their styles of light cavalries, such as Hungarian mounted archers, Spanish jinetes, Italian and German mounted crossbowmen and English currours.

The infantry was recruited and trained in a wide variety of manners in different regions of Europe all through the Middle Ages, and probably always formed the most numerous part of a medieval field army. Many infantrymen in prolonged wars would be mercenaries. Most armies contained significant numbers of spearmen, archers and other unmounted soldiers.

=== Recruiting ===
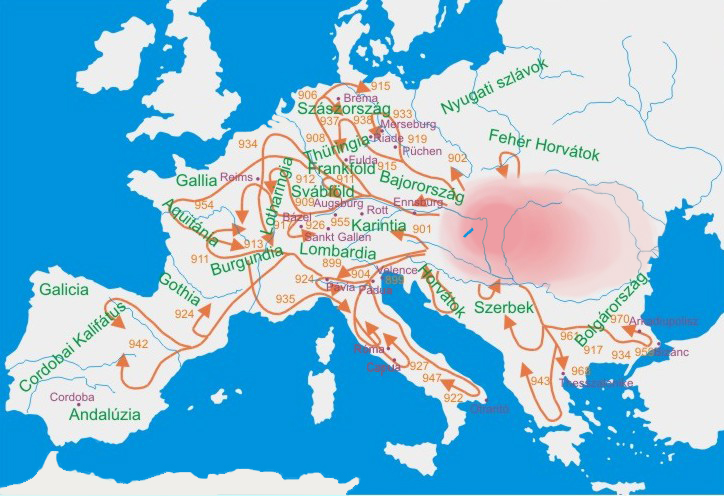
Hungarian raids in the 10th century. Before the battle of Lechfeld in 955 Medieval Europeans were vulnerable from the Nomadic style of war that came from the Hungarians.

In the earliest Middle Ages, it was the obligation of every noble to respond to the call to battle with his equipment, archers, and infantry. This decentralized system was necessary due to the social order of the time but could lead to motley forces with variable training, equipment and abilities. The more resources the noble had access to, the better his troops would typically be.

Typically the feudal armies consisted of a core of highly skilled knights and their household troops, mercenaries hired for the time of the campaign and feudal levies fulfilling their feudal obligations, who usually were little more than rabble. They could, however, be efficient in disadvantageous terrain. Towns and cities could also field militias.

As central governments grew in power, a return to the citizen and mercenary armies of the classical period also began, as central levies of the peasantry began to be the central recruiting tool. It was estimated that the best infantrymen came from the younger sons of free land-owning yeomen, such as the English archers and Swiss pikemen. England was one of the most centralized states in the Late Middle Ages, and the armies that fought the Hundred Years' War were mostly paid professionals.

In theory, every Englishman had an obligation to serve for forty days. Forty days was not long enough for a campaign, especially one on the continent. Thus the scutage was introduced, whereby most Englishmen paid to escape their service and this money was used to create a permanent army. However, almost all high medieval armies in Europe were composed of a great deal of paid core troops, and there was a large mercenary market in Europe from at least the early 12th century.

As the Middle Ages progressed in Italy, Italian cities began to rely mostly on mercenaries to do their fighting rather than the militias that had dominated the early and high medieval period in this region. These would be groups of career soldiers who would be paid a set rate. Mercenaries tended to be effective soldiers, especially in combination with standing forces, but in Italy, they came to dominate the armies of the city-states. This made them problematic; while at war they were considerably more reliable than a standing army, at peacetime they proved a risk to the state itself like the Praetorian Guard had once been.

Mercenary-on-mercenary warfare in Italy led to relatively bloodless campaigns which relied as much on manoeuvre as on battles, since the condottieri recognized it was more efficient to attack the enemy's ability to wage war rather than his battle forces, discovering the concept of indirect warfare 500 years before Sir Basil Liddell Hart, and attempting to attack the enemy supply lines, his economy and his ability to wage war rather than risking an open battle, and manoeuvre him into a position where risking a battle would have been suicidal. Machiavelli understood this indirect approach as cowardice.

== Fortifications ==
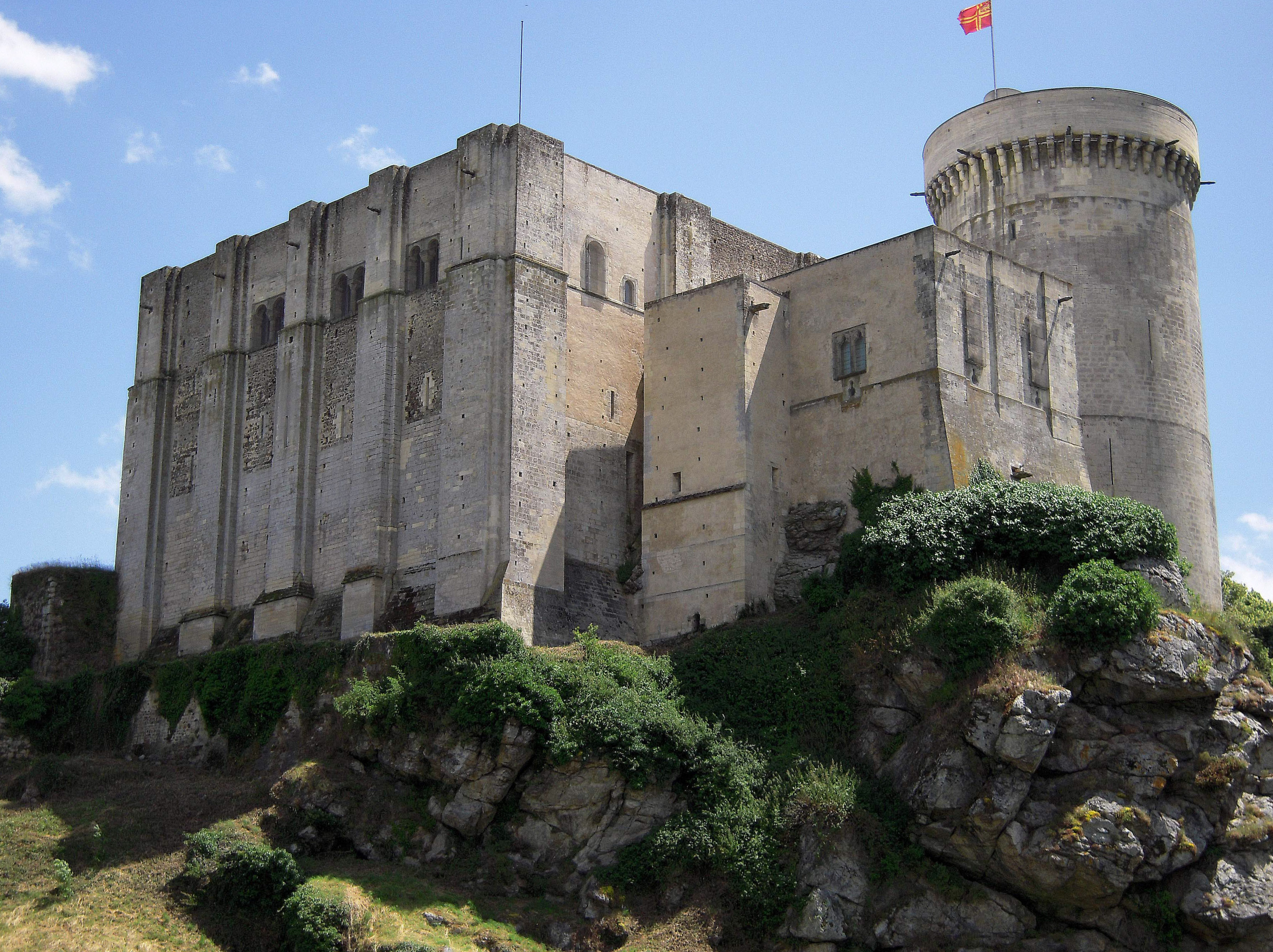
The Château de Falaise in France.

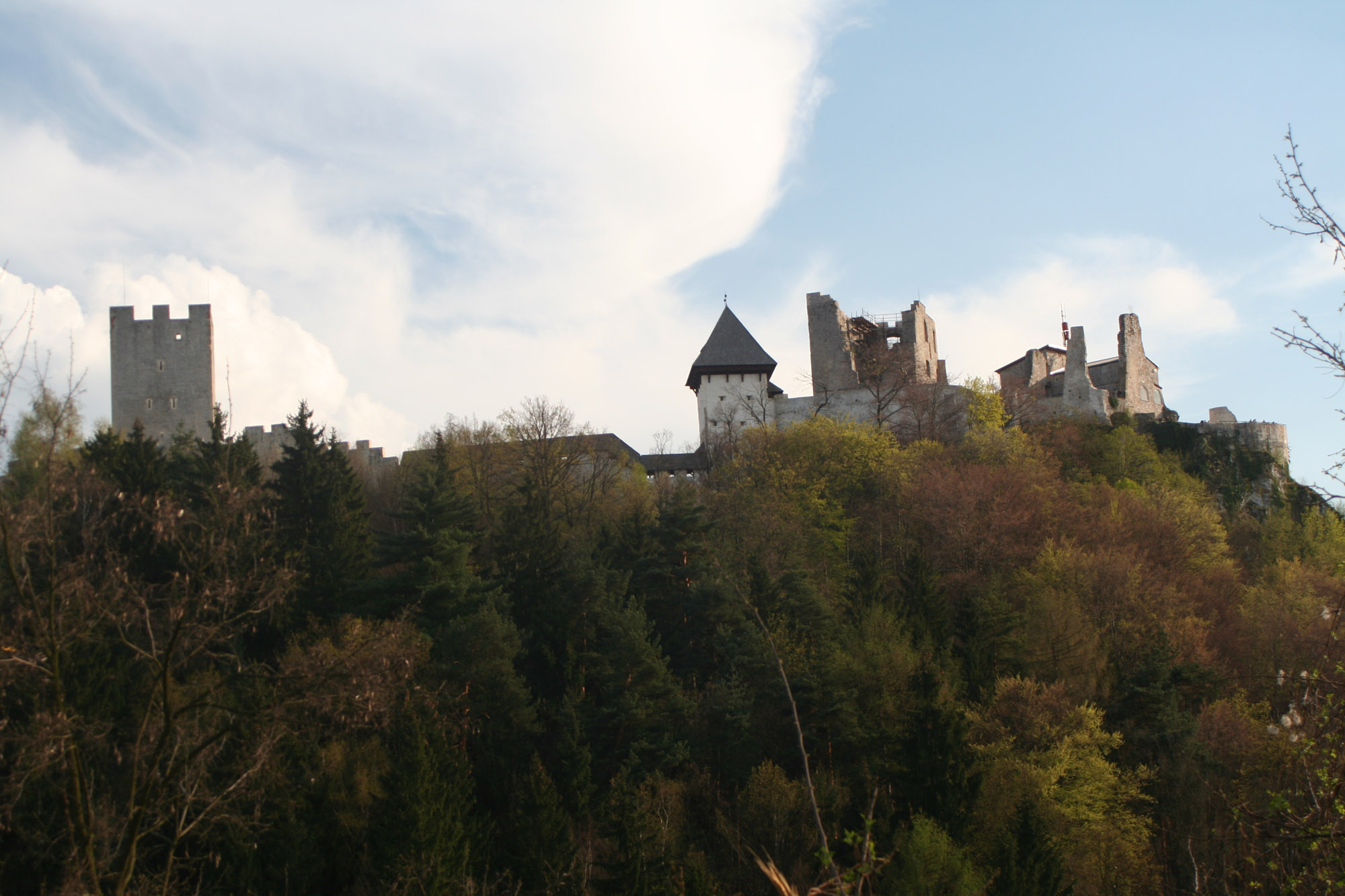
Celje Castle in Slovenia.

In Europe, breakdowns in centralized power led to the rise of several groups that turned to large-scale pillage as a source of income. Most notably the Vikings, Arabs, Mongols, Huns, Cumans, Tartars, and Magyars raided significantly. As these groups were generally small and needed to move quickly, building fortifications was a good way to provide refuge and protection for the people and the wealth in the region.

These fortifications evolved throughout the Middle Ages, the most important form being the castle, a structure which has become almost synonymous with the medieval era in the popular eye. The castle served as a protected place for the local elites. Inside a castle they were protected from bands of raiders and could send mounted warriors to drive the enemy from the area, or to disrupt the efforts of larger armies to supply themselves in the region by gaining local superiority over foraging parties that would be impossible against the whole enemy host.

Fortifications were a very important part of warfare because they provided safety to the lord, his family, and his servants. They provided refuge from armies too large to face in open battle. The ability of the heavy cavalry to dominate a battle on an open field was useless against fortifications. Building siege engines was a time-consuming process, and could seldom be effectively done without preparations before the campaign. Many sieges could take months, if not years, to weaken or demoralize the defenders sufficiently. Fortifications were an excellent means of ensuring that the elite could not be easily dislodged from their lands – as Count Baldwin of Hainaut commented in 1184 on seeing enemy troops ravage his lands from the safety of his castle, "they can't take the land with them".

=== Siege warfare ===
In the medieval period besieging armies used a wide variety of siege engines including: scaling ladders; battering rams; siege towers and various types of catapults such as the mangonel, onager, ballista, and trebuchet. Siege techniques also included mining in which tunnels were dug under a section of the wall and then rapidly collapsed to destabilize the wall's foundation. Another technique was to bore into the enemy walls, however, this was not nearly as effective as other methods due to the thickness of castle walls.

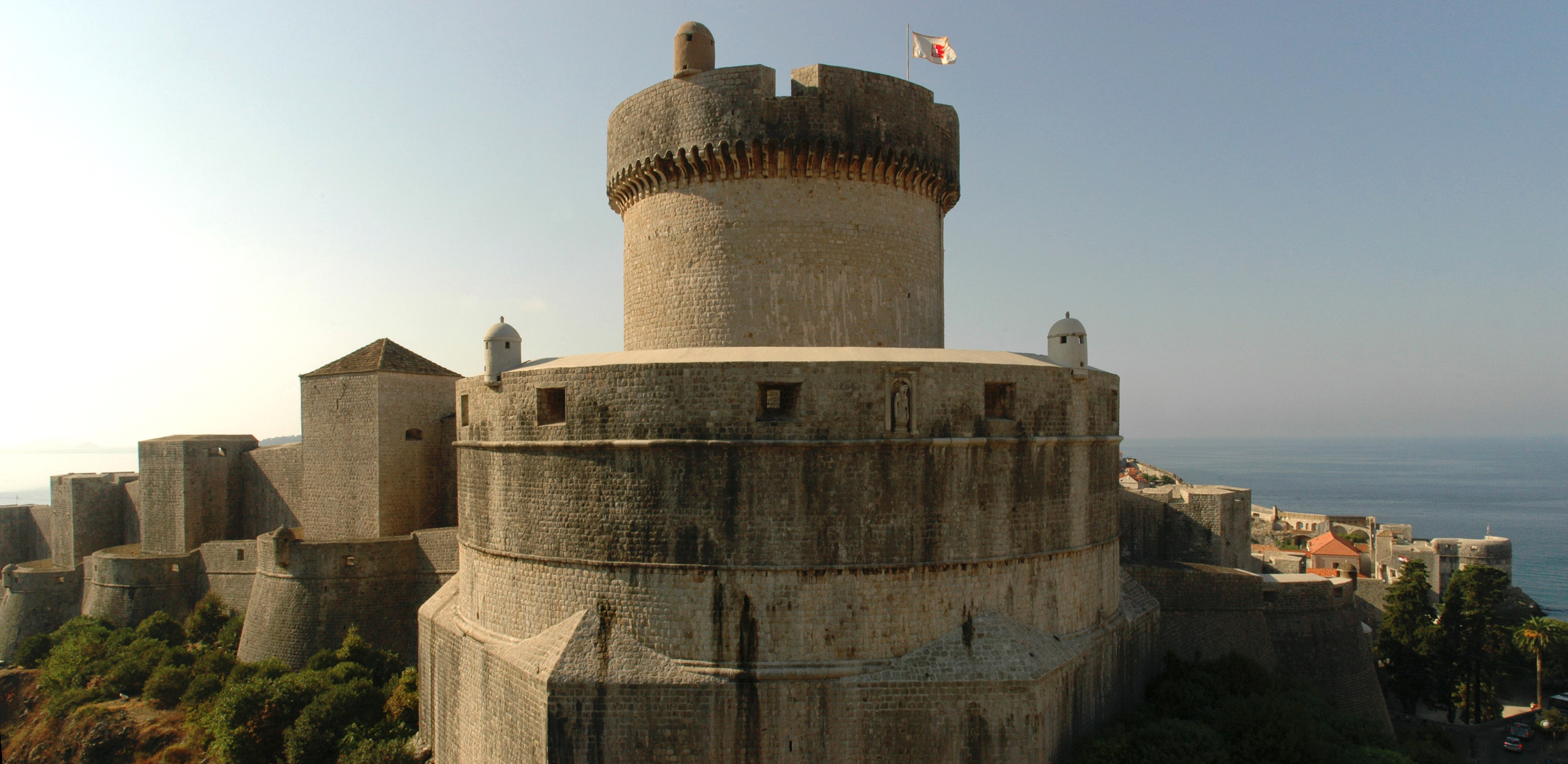
The Walls of Dubrovnik are a series of defensive stone walls, never breached by a hostile army, that have surrounded and protected the maritime city-state of Dubrovnik (Ragusa), situated in southern Croatia.

Advances in the prosecution of sieges encouraged the development of a variety of defensive counter-measures. In particular, Medieval fortifications became progressively stronger – for example, the advent of the concentric castle from the period of the Crusades – and more dangerous to attackers – witness the increasing use of machicolations, as well the preparation of hot or incendiary substances. Arrow slits, concealed doors for sallies, and deep water wells were also integral to resisting siege at this time. Designers of castles paid particular attention to defending entrances, protecting gates with drawbridges, portcullises and barbicans. Wet animal skins were often draped over gates to repel fire. Moats and other water defences, whether natural or augmented, were also vital to defenders.

In the Middle Ages, virtually all large cities had city walls – Dubrovnik in Dalmatia is a well-preserved example – and more important cities had citadels, forts or castles. Great effort was expended to ensure a good water supply inside the city in case of siege. In some cases, long tunnels were constructed to carry water into the city. In other cases, such as the Ottoman siege of Shkodra, Venetian engineers had designed and installed cisterns that were fed by rain water channeled by a system of conduits in the walls and buildings. Complex systems of tunnels were used for storage and communications in medieval cities like Tábor in Bohemia. Against these would be matched the mining skills of teams of trained sappers, who were sometimes employed by besieging armies.

Until the invention of gunpowder-based weapons (and the resulting higher-velocity projectiles), the balance of power and logistics favoured the defender. With the invention of gunpowder, the traditional methods of defence became less and less effective against a determined siege.

== Relics ==
The practice of carrying relics into battle is a feature that distinguishes medieval warfare from its predecessors or early modern warfare and possibly inspired by biblical references. The presence of relics was believed to be an important source of supernatural power that served both as a spiritual weapon and a form of defence; the relics of martyrs were considered by Saint John Chrysostom much more powerful than "walls, trenches, weapons and hosts of soldiers"

In Italy, the carroccio or carro della guerra, the "war wagon", was an elaboration of this practice that developed during the 13th century. The carro della guerra of Milan was described in detail in 1288 by Bonvesin de la Riva in his book on the "Marvels of Milan". Wrapped in scarlet cloth and drawn by three yoke of oxen that were caparisoned in white with the red cross of Saint Ambrose, the city's patron, it carried a crucifix so massive it took four men to step it in place, like a ship's mast.

== Naval warfare ==
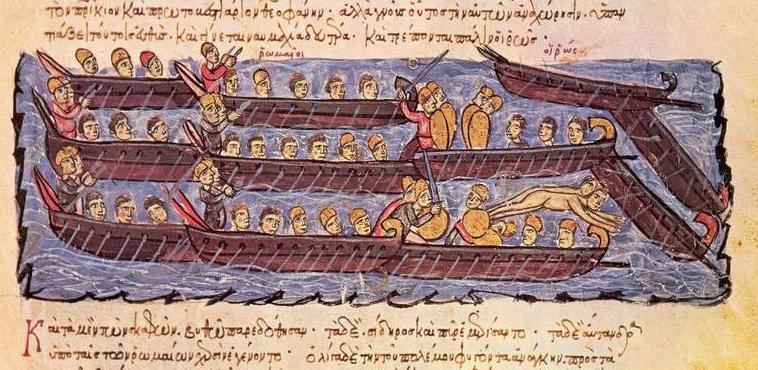
The Byzantine fleet repels the Rus' attack on Constantinople in 941. The Byzantine dromons are rolling over the Rus' vessels and smashing their oars with their spurs.

The waters surrounding Europe can be grouped into two types which affected the design of craft that traveled and therefore the warfare. The Mediterranean and Black Seas were free of large tides, generally calm, and had predictable weather. The seas around the north and west of Europe experienced stronger and less predictable weather. The weather gauge, the advantage of having a following wind, was an important factor in naval battles, particularly to the attackers. Typically westerlies (winds blowing from west to east) dominated Europe, giving naval powers to the west an advantage. Medieval sources on the conduct of medieval naval warfare are less common than those about land-based war. Most medieval chroniclers had no experience of life on the sea and generally were not well informed. Maritime archaeology has helped provide information.

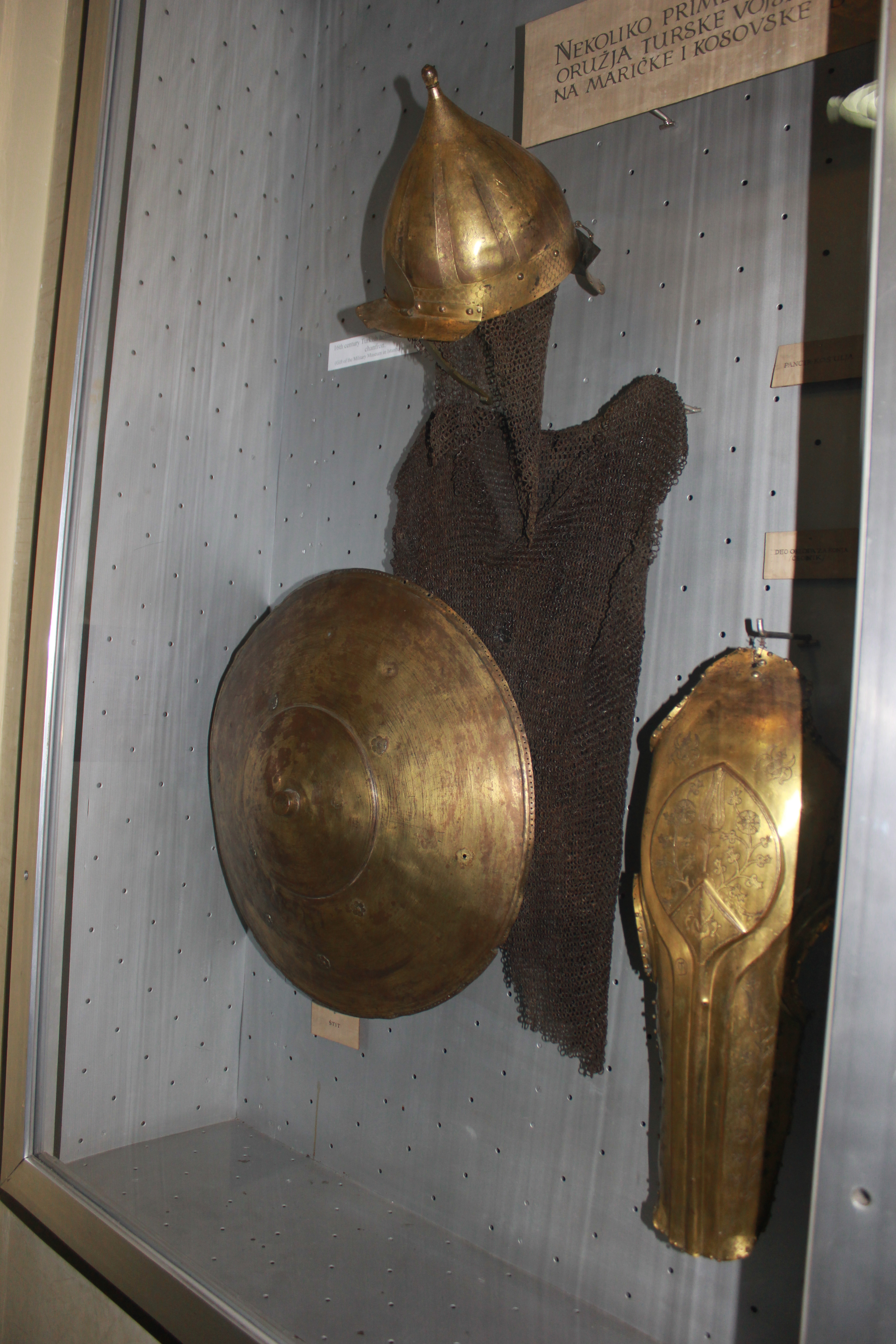
Turkish armor during battles of Marica and Kosovo in 1371 and 1389

Early in the medieval period, ships in the context of warfare were used primarily for transporting troops. In the Mediterranean, naval warfare in the Middle Ages was similar to that under late Roman Empire: fleets of galleys would exchange missile fire and then try to board bow first to allow marines to fight on deck. This mode of naval warfare remained the same into the early modern period, as, for example, at the Battle of Lepanto. Famous admirals included Roger of Lauria, Andrea Doria and Hayreddin Barbarossa.

Late medieval maritime warfare was divided in two distinct regions. In the Mediterranean, galleys were used for raiding along coasts, and in the constant fighting for naval bases. In the Atlantic and Baltic there was greater focus on sailing ships that were used mostly for troop transport, with galleys providing fighting support. Galleys were still widely used in the north and were the most numerous warships used by Mediterranean powers with interests in the north, especially the French and Iberian kingdoms.

Bulkier ships were developed which were primarily sail-driven, although the long lowboard Viking-style rowed longship saw use well into the 15th century. Their main purpose in the north remained the transportation of soldiers to fight on the decks of the opposing ship (as, for example, at the Battle of Svolder or the Battle of Sluys).

Late medieval sailing warships resembled floating fortresses, with towers in the bows and at the stern (respectively, the forecastle and aftcastle). The large superstructure made these warships quite unstable, but the decisive defeats that the more mobile but considerably lower boarded longships suffered at the hands of high-boarded cogs in the 15th century ended the issue of which ship type would dominate northern European warfare.

=== Introduction of guns ===
The introduction of guns was the first step towards major changes in naval warfare, but it only slowly changed the dynamics of ship-to-ship combat. The first guns on ships were introduced in the 14th century and consisted of small wrought-iron pieces placed on the open decks and in the fighting tops, often requiring only one or two men to handle them. They were designed to injure, kill or simply stun, shock and frighten the enemy before boarding.

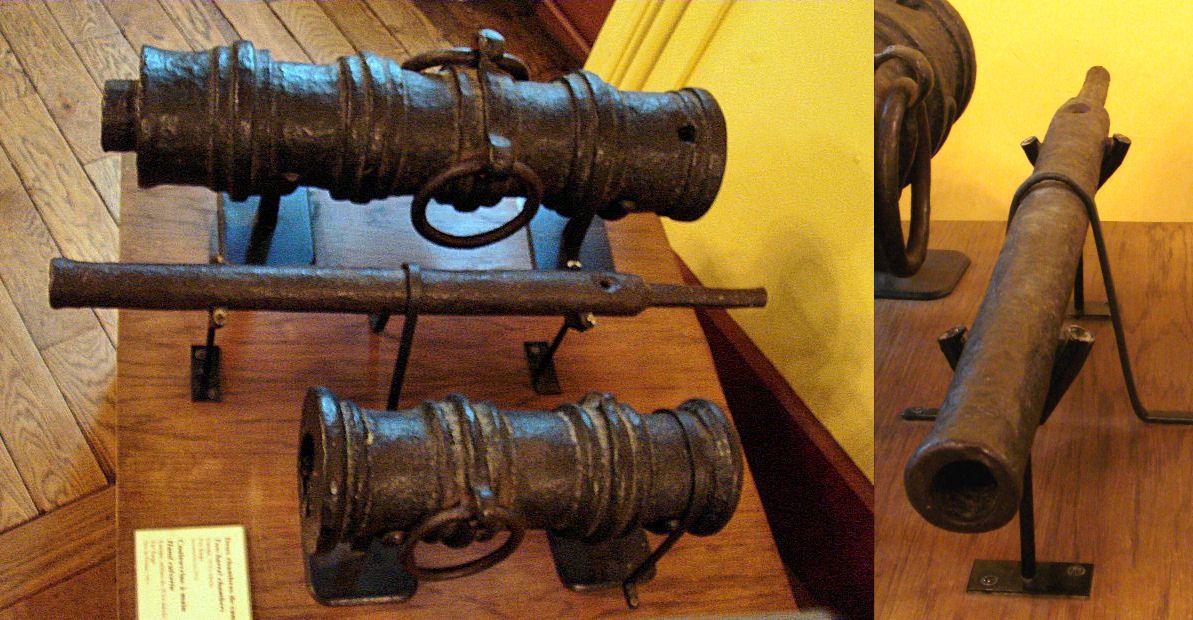
Two views of a hand culverin and two small cannons from the 15th century.

As guns were made more durable to withstand stronger gunpowder charges, they increased their potential to inflict critical damage to the vessel rather than just their crews. Since these guns were much heavier than the earlier anti-personnel weapons, they had to be placed lower in the ships, and fire from gunports, to avoid ships becoming unstable. In Northern Europe the technique of building ships with clinker planking made it difficult to cut ports in the hull; clinker-built (or clench-built) ships had much of their structural strength in the outer hull. The solution was the gradual adoption of carvel-built ships that relied on an internal skeleton structure to bear the weight of the ship.

The first ships to actually mount heavy cannon capable of sinking ships were galleys, with large wrought-iron pieces mounted directly on the timbers in the bow. The first example is known from a woodcut of a Venetian galley from 1486. Heavy artillery on galleys was mounted in the bow which fit conveniently with the long-standing tactical tradition of attacking head-on and bow-first. The ordnance on galleys was quite heavy from its introduction in the 1480s, and capable of quickly demolishing medieval-style stone walls that still prevailed until the 16th century.

This temporarily upended the strength of older seaside fortresses, which had to be rebuilt to cope with gunpowder weapons. The addition of guns also improved the amphibious abilities of galleys as they could assault supported with heavy firepower, and could be even more effectively defended when beached stern-first. Galleys and similar oared vessels remained uncontested as the most effective gun-armed warships in theory until the 1560s, and in practice for a few decades more, and were considered a grave risk to sailing warships.

== Rise of infantry ==
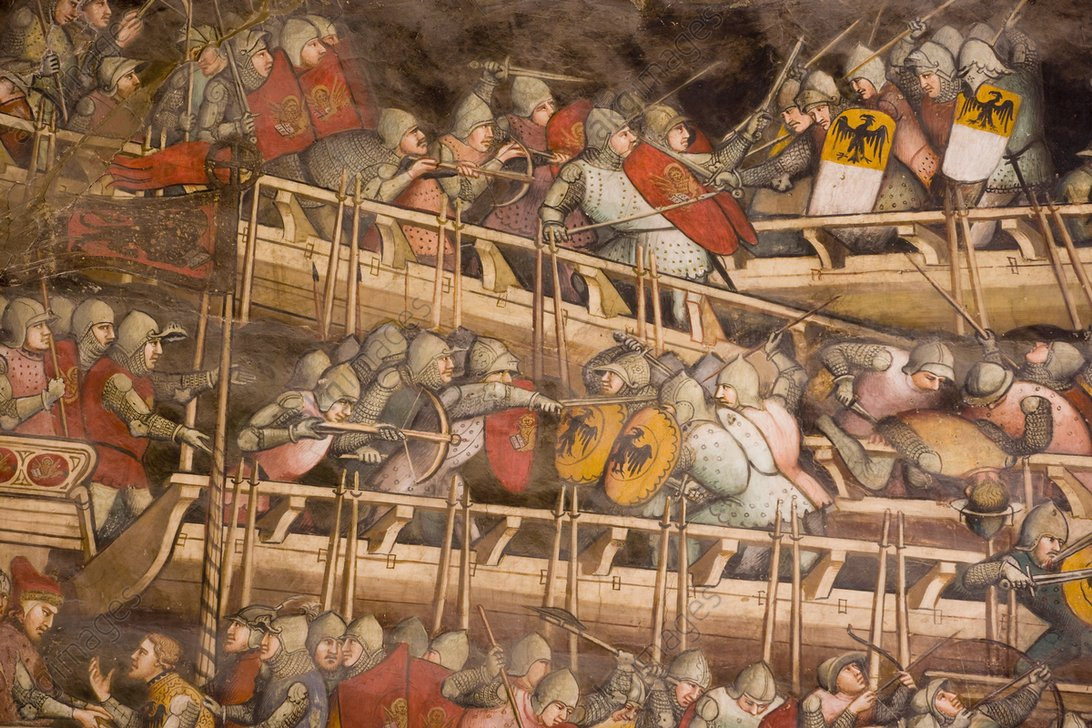
A battle between the Venetian and Holy Roman fleets. Detail of a fresco by Spinello Aretino 1407–1408.

In the medieval period, the mounted cavalry long held sway on the battlefield. Heavily armoured mounted knights represented a formidable foe for reluctant peasant draftees and lightly armoured freemen. To defeat mounted cavalry, infantry used swarms of missiles or a tightly packed phalanx of men, techniques honed in antiquity by the Greeks.

=== Swiss pikemen ===
The use of long pikes and densely packed foot troops was not uncommon in the Middle Ages. The Flemish footmen at the Battle of the Golden Spurs met and overcame French knights in 1302, as the Lombards did in Legnano in 1176 and the Scots held their own against heavily armoured English cavalry. During the St. Louis crusade, dismounted French knights formed a tight lance-and-shield phalanx to repel Egyptian cavalry. The Swiss used pike tactics in the late medieval period. While pikemen usually grouped and awaited a mounted attack, the Swiss developed flexible formations and aggressive manoeuvring, forcing their opponents to respond. The Swiss won at Morgarten, Laupen, Sempach, Grandson and Murten, and between 1450 and 1550 every leading prince in Europe (except the English and Scottish) hired Swiss pikemen, or emulated their tactics and weapons (e.g., the German Landsknechte).

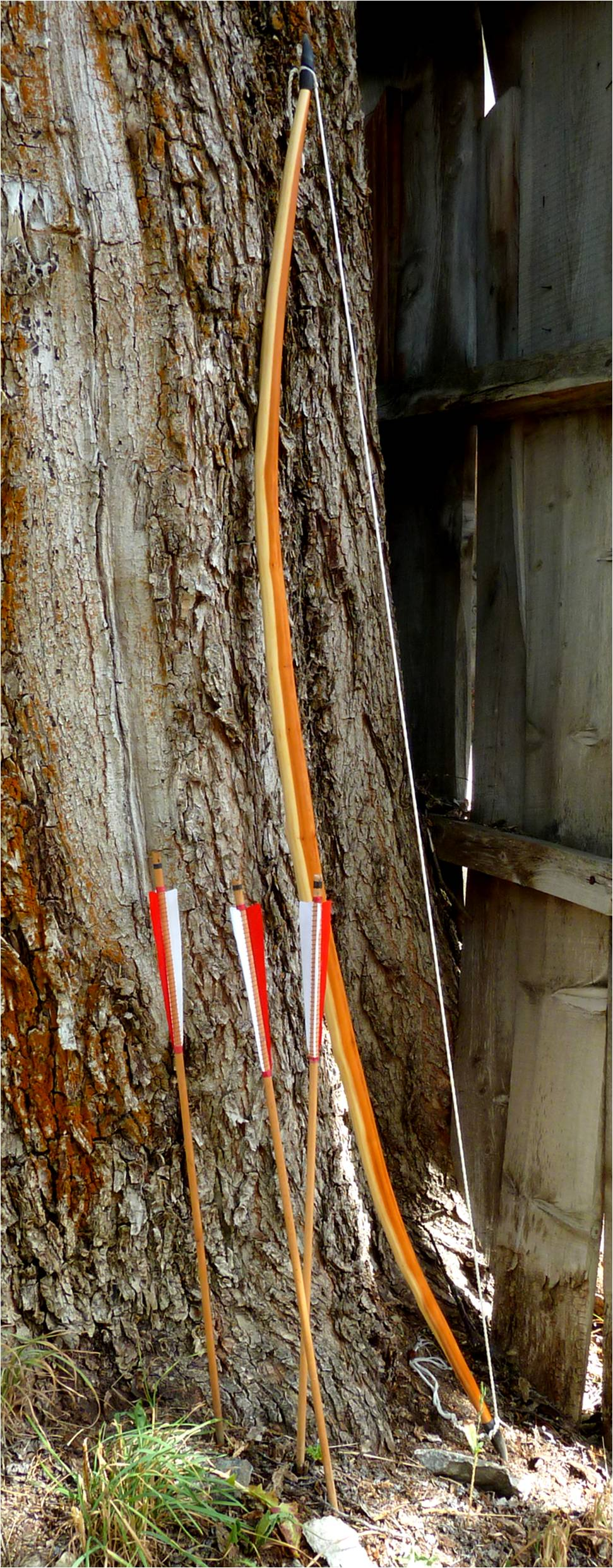
A modern replica of an English longbow.

=== Welsh and English longbowmen ===
The Welsh and English longbowmen used a single-piece longbow (but some bows later developed a composite design) to deliver arrows that could penetrate contemporary mail and damage/dent plate armour. The longbow was a difficult weapon to master, requiring long years of use and constant practice. A skilled longbowman could shoot about 12 shots per minute. This rate of fire was far superior to competing weapons like the crossbow or early gunpowder weapons. The nearest competitor to the longbow was the much more expensive crossbow, used often by urban militias and mercenary forces. The crossbow had greater penetrating power and did not require the extended years of training. However, it lacked the rate of fire of the longbow.

At Crécy and Agincourt bowmen unleashed clouds of arrows into the ranks of knights. At Crécy, even 5,000 Genoese crossbowmen could not dislodge them from their hill. At Agincourt, thousands of French knights were brought down by armour-piercing bodkin point arrows and horse-maiming broadheads. Longbowmen decimated an entire generation of the French nobility.

== Transition to gunpowder warfare ==
In 1326 the earliest known European picture of a gun appeared in a manuscript by Walter de Milemete. In 1350, Petrarch wrote that the presence of cannons on the battlefield was 'as common and familiar as other kinds of arms'.

Early artillery played a limited role in the Hundred Years' War, and it became indispensable in the Italian Wars of 1494–1559, marking the beginning of early modern warfare. Charles VIII, during his invasion of Italy, brought with him the first truly mobile siege train: culverins and bombards mounted on wheeled carriages, which could be deployed against an enemy stronghold immediately after arrival.

== Strategy and tactics ==
Medieval campaigns were planned with strategy in mind, such as maintaining unity in morale, planning troop movements, and mount offensives with numerical advantages. Medieval armies used strategic deception, such as misleading troop movements, to take opposing armies by surprise. They would also spread misinformation regarding army size and provisions.

One common tactic used in medieval warfare was raiding; this benefitted the attacking army by with new supplies and wealth while damaging the target's resources.

=== De re militari ===
si vis pacem, para bellum
If you want peace, prepare for war

— Vegetius, De re militari, preface to book 3.

Publius Flavius Vegetius Renatus wrote De re militari (Concerning Military Matters) possibly in the late 4th century. Described by historian Walter Goffart as "the bible of warfare throughout the Middle Ages", De re militari was widely distributed through the Latin West. While Western Europe relied on a single text for the basis of its military knowledge, the Byzantine Empire in Southeastern Europe had a succession of military writers. Though Vegetius had no military experience and De re militari was derived from the works of Cato and Frontinus, his books were the standard for military discourse in Western Europe from their production until the 16th century.

De re militari was divided into five books: who should be a soldier and the skills they needed to learn, the composition and structure of an army, field tactics, how to conduct and withstand sieges, and the role of the navy. According to Vegetius, infantry was the most important element of an army because it was cheap compared to cavalry and could be deployed on any terrain. One of the tenets he put forward was that a general should only engage in battle when he was sure of victory or had no other choice. As archaeologist Robert Liddiard explains, "Pitched battles, particularly in the eleventh and twelfth centuries, were rare." Although it is likely that many early medieval generals were unable to read Vegetius's work, Charlemagne's educational renaissance in the late 8th century was key to reproduction and dissemination of this document. Knowledge was often transmitted orally; reading aloud was a standard teaching tool by literate clerics in assemblies, courts and military camps. There is direct textual reference in the 9th century by Rabanus Maurus (Abbot of Fulda) who produced an adapted version of De re militari to suit a Christian ruler for "practical use", implying it was made accessible to commanders. De re militari would become the most widely used military text up to the 18th century.

Although his work was widely reproduced, and over 200 copies, translations, and extracts survive today, the extent to which Vegetius affected the actual practice of warfare as opposed to its concept is unclear because of his habit of stating the obvious. Historian Michael Clanchy noted "the medieval axiom that laymen are illiterate and its converse that clergy are literate", so it may be the case that few soldiers read Vegetius' work. While their Roman predecessors were well-educated and had been experienced in warfare, the European nobility of the early medieval period were not renowned for their education, but from the 12th century, it became more common for them to read.

Some soldiers regarded the experience of warfare as more valuable than reading about it; for example, Geoffroi de Charny, a 14th-century knight who wrote about warfare, recommended that his audience should learn by observing and asking advice from their superiors. Vegetius remained prominent in medieval literature on warfare, although it is uncertain to what extent his work was read by the warrior class as opposed to the clergy. In 1489, King Henry VII of England commissioned the translation of De re militari into English, "so every gentleman born to arms and all manner of men of war, captains, soldiers, victuallers and all others would know how they ought to behave in the feats of wars and battles".

== Supplies and logistics ==
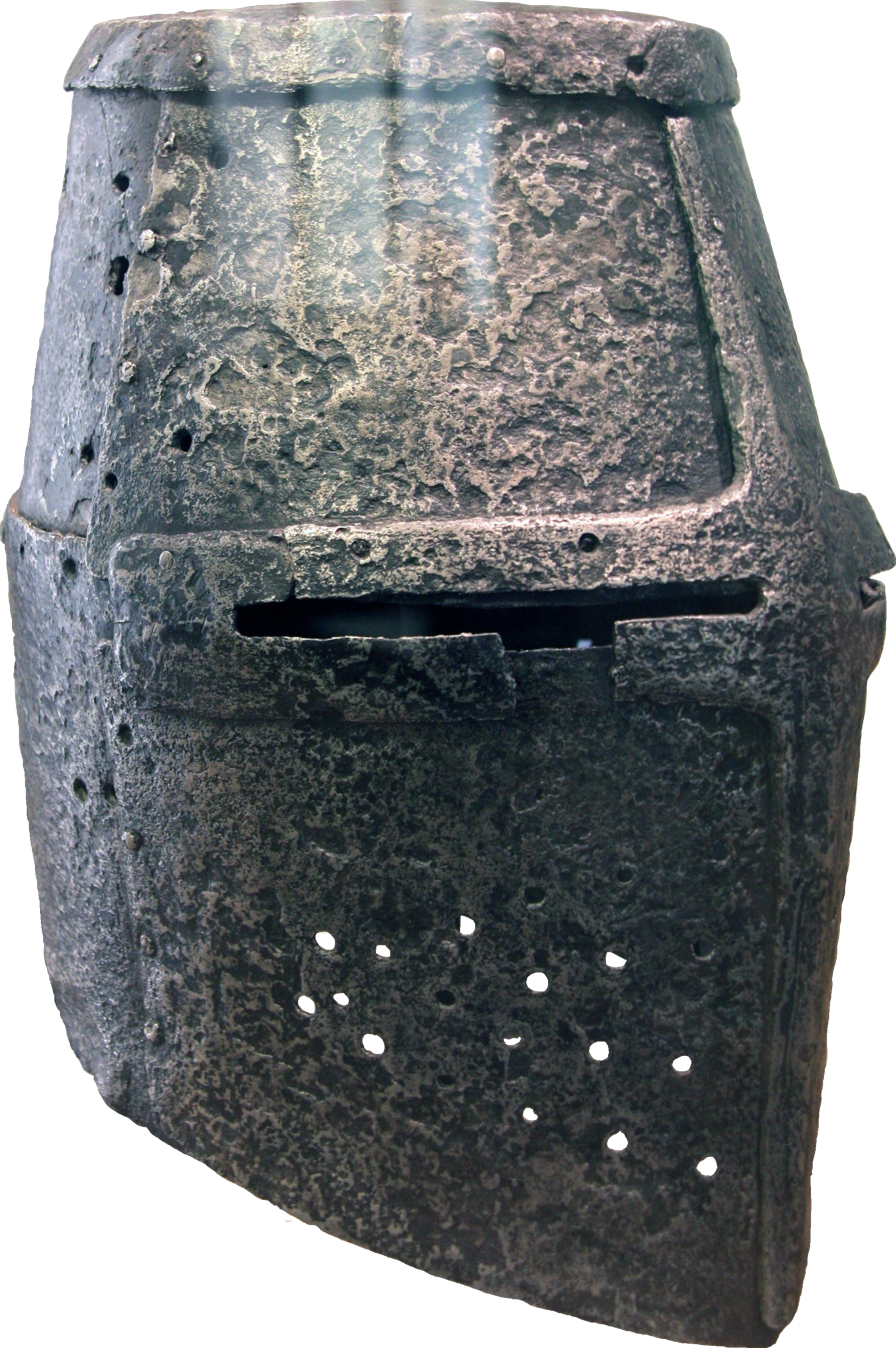
13th century German great helm with a flat top to the skull

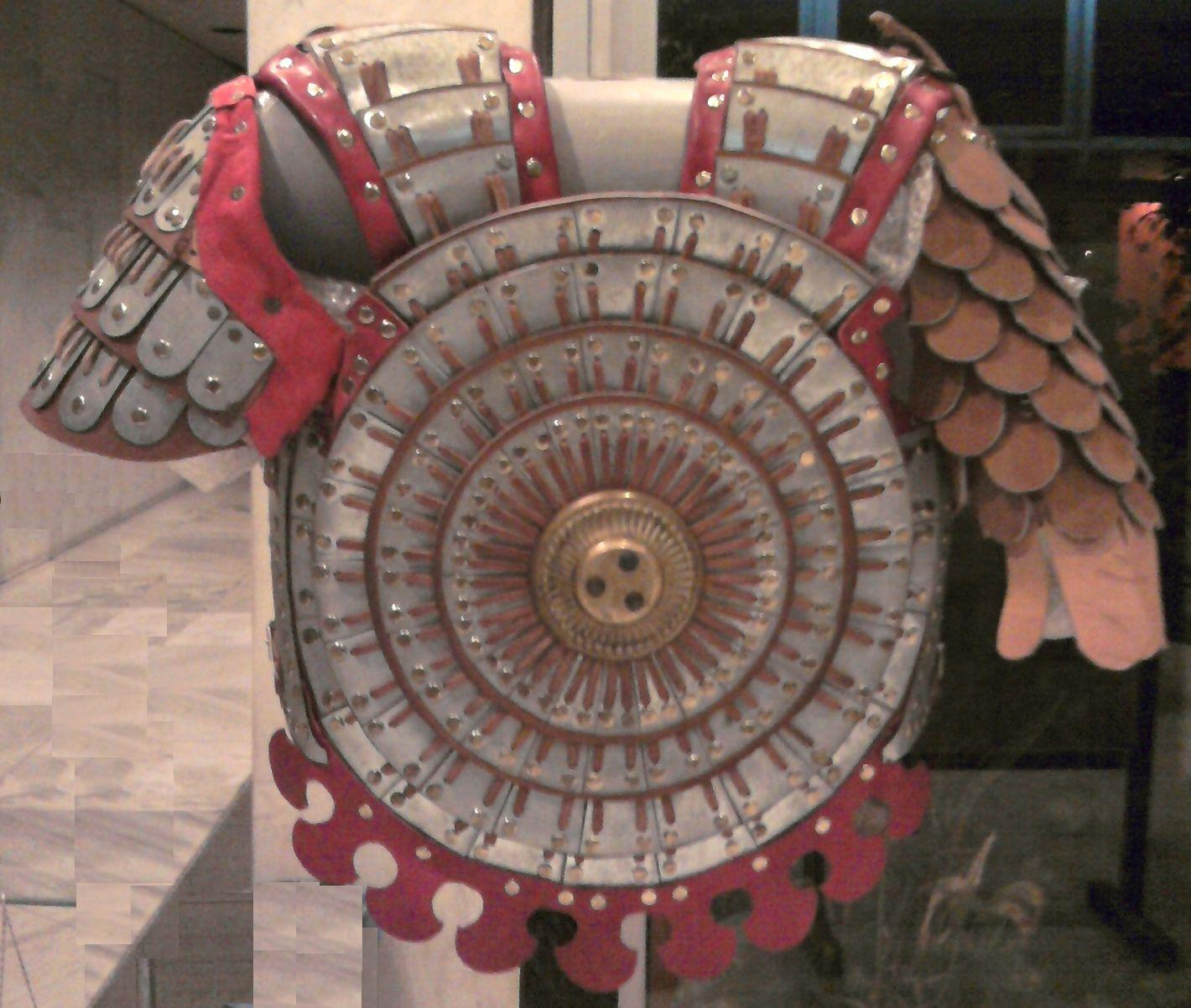
Byzantine klivanion

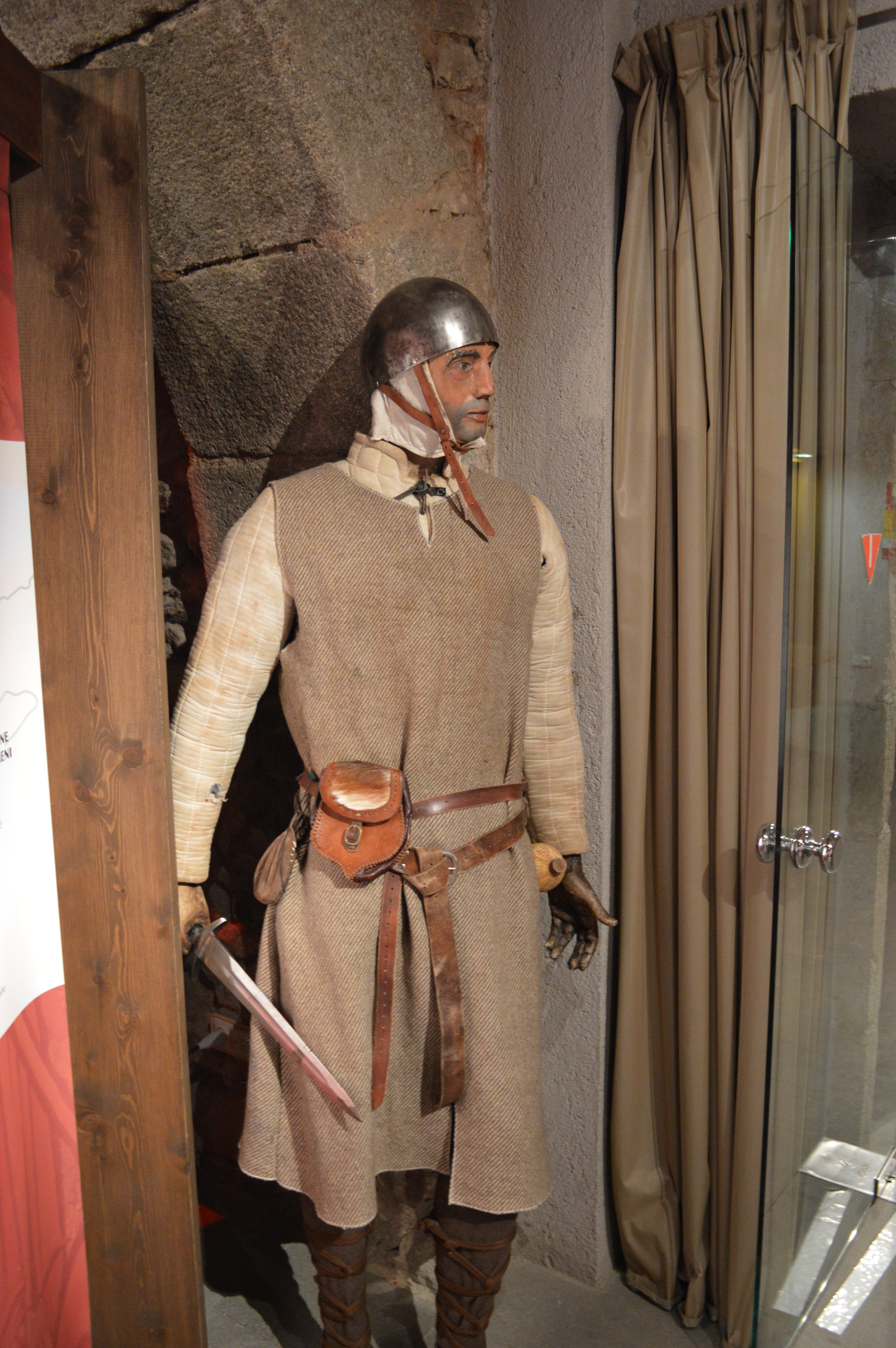
Spanish Almogávar

Medieval warfare largely predated the use of supply trains, which meant that armies had to acquire food supplies from the territory they were passing through. This meant that large-scale looting by soldiers was unavoidable, and was actively encouraged in the 14th century with its emphasis on chevauchée tactics, where mounted troops would burn and pillage enemy territory in order to distract and demoralize the enemy while denying them their supplies.

Through the medieval period, soldiers were responsible for supplying themselves, either through foraging, looting, or purchases. Even so, military commanders often provided their troops with food and supplies, but this would be provided instead of the soldiers' wages, or soldiers would be expected to pay for it from their wages, either at cost or even with a profit.

In 1294, the same year John II de Balliol of Scotland refused to support Edward I of England's planned invasion of France, Edward I implemented a system in Wales and Scotland where sheriffs would acquire foodstuffs, horses and carts from merchants with compulsory sales at prices fixed below typical market prices under the Crown's rights of prise and purveyance. These goods would then be transported to Royal Magazines in southern Scotland and along the Scottish border where English conscripts under his command could purchase them. This continued during the First War of Scottish Independence which began in 1296, though the system was unpopular and was ended with Edward I's death in 1307.

Starting under the rule of Edward II in 1307 and ending under the rule of Edward III in 1337, the English instead used a system where merchants would be asked to meet armies with supplies for the soldiers to purchase. This led to discontent as the merchants saw an opportunity to profiteer, forcing the troops to pay well above normal market prices for food.

As Edward III went to war with France in the Hundred Years' War (starting in 1337), the English returned to a practice of foraging and raiding to meet their logistical needs. This practice lasted throughout the war, extending through the remainder of Edward III's reign into the reign of Henry VI.

== Regional examples ==
=== Arabs ===
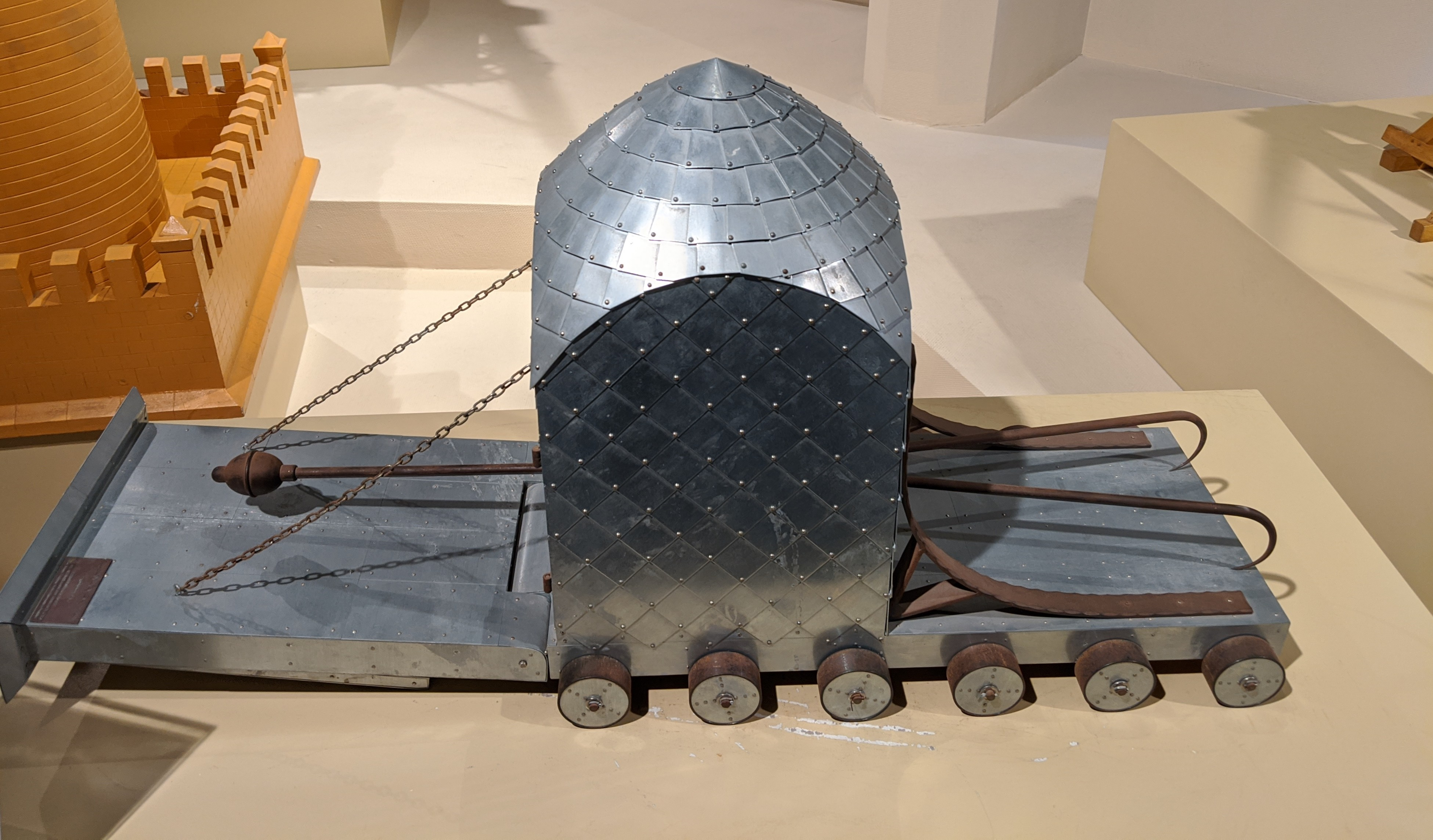
14th century Arab style battering ram

The initial Muslim conquests began in the 7th century after the death of the Islamic prophet Muhammad, and were marked by a century of rapid Arab expansion beyond the Arabian Peninsula under the Rashidun and Umayyad Caliphates. Under the Rashidun, the Arabs conquered the Persian Empire, along with Roman Syria and Roman Egypt during the Byzantine-Arab Wars, all within just seven years from 633 to 640. Under the Umayyads, the Arabs annexed North Africa and southern Italy from the Romans and the Arab Empire soon stretched from parts of the Indian subcontinent, across Central Asia, the Middle East, North Africa, and southern Italy, Italy, to the Iberian Peninsula and the Pyrenees.

The early Arab army mainly consisted of camel-mounted infantry, alongside a few Bedouin cavalry. Constantly outnumbered by their opponent, they did, however, possess the advantage of strategic mobility, their camel-borne nature allowing them to constantly outmaneuver larger Byzantine and Sassanid armies to take prime defensive positions. The Rashidun cavalry, while lacking the number and mounted archery skill of their Roman and Persian counterparts was for the most part skillfully employed, and played a decisive role in many crucial battles such as Battle of Yarmouk. During the 7th century, Arab armies employed weapons such as swords, spears, iron mace and lances. For protection, they used shields and wore helmets and coats of mail, although the latter was extremely rare. The bow and arrow was also utilized. Also, after the naval siege of Constantinople in the 670s, they started to employ greek fire.

In contrast to the Roman and Persian army at the time both had large numbers of heavy infantry and heavy cavalry (cataphracts and clibanarii) that were better equipped, heavily protected, and were more experienced and disciplined. The Arab invasions came at a time when both ancient powers were exhausted from the protracted Byzantine–Sassanid Wars, particularly the bitterly fought Byzantine–Sassanid War of 602–628 which had brought both empires close to collapse. Also, the typically multi-ethnic Byzantine force was always wracked by dissension and lacked a unity of command, a similar situation also being encountered among the Sassanids who had been embroiled in a bitter civil war for a decade before the coming of the Arabs. In contrast, the Ridda Wars which preceded the Arab conflicts with both the Sasanids and the Byzantines, had forged the Caliphate's army into a united and loyal fighting force.

=== Vikings ===
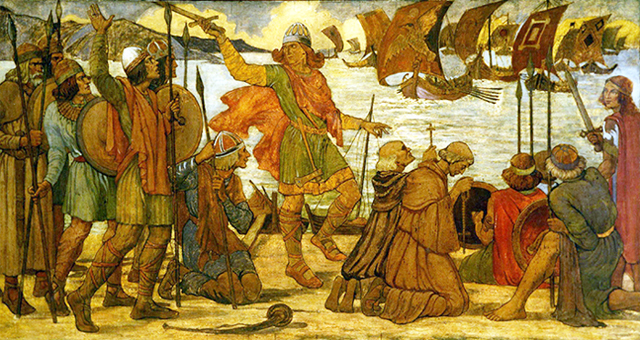
Viking fleet landing at Dublin, 841

The Vikings were a feared force in Europe because of their savagery and speed of their attacks. Whilst seaborne raids were nothing new at the time, the Vikings refined the practice to a science through their shipbuilding, tactics and training. Unlike other raiders, the Vikings made a lasting impact on the face of Europe. During the Viking age, their expeditions, frequently combining raiding and trading, penetrated most of the old Frankish Empire, the British Isles, the Baltic region, Russia, and both Muslim and Christian Iberia. Many served as mercenaries, and the famed Varangian Guard, serving the Emperor of Constantinople, was drawn principally of Scandinavian warriors.

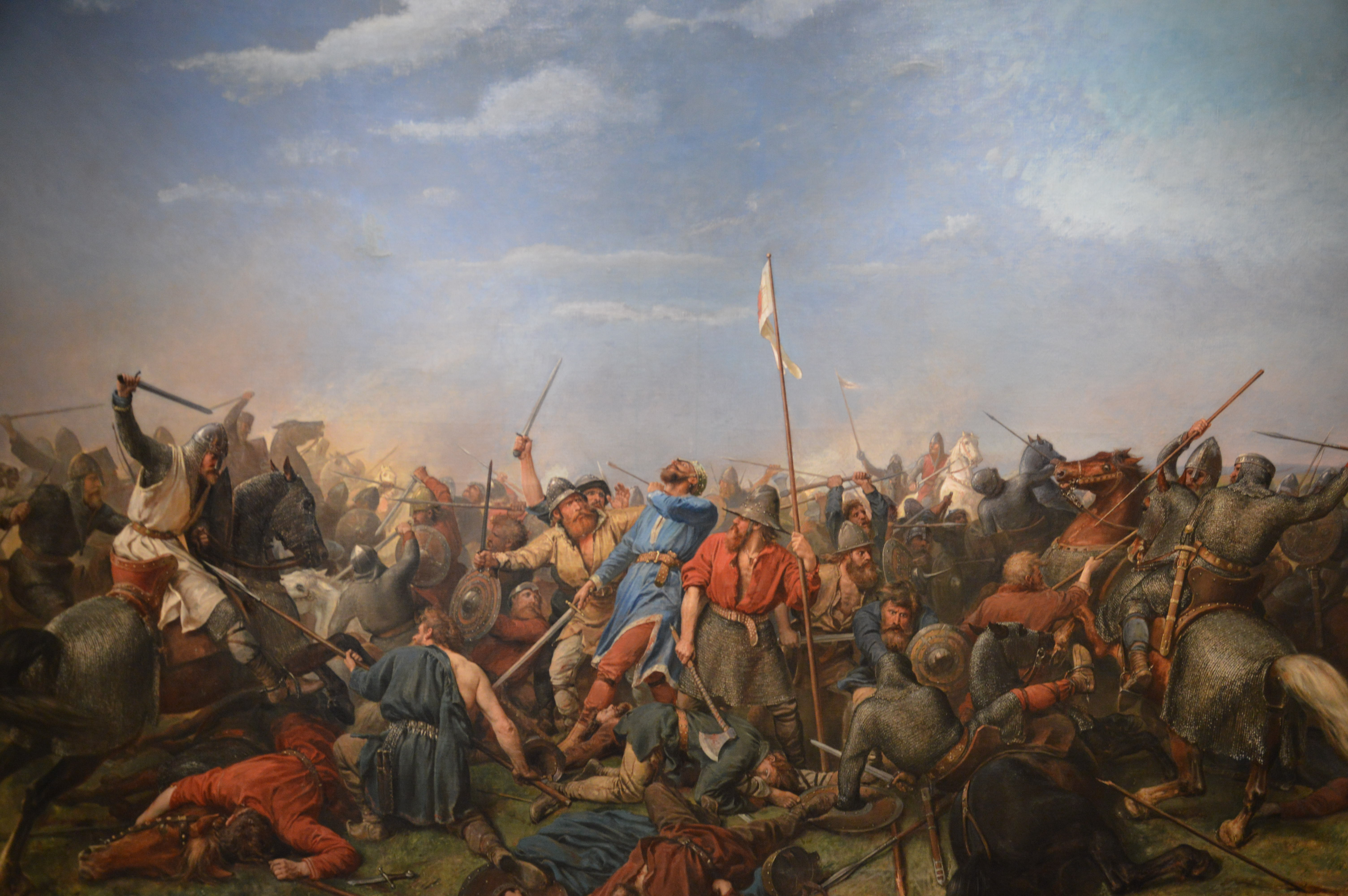
Norwegian Vikings' defeat at the Battle of Stamford Bridge, 1066

Viking longships were swift and easily manoeuvered; they could navigate deep seas or shallow rivers, and could carry warriors that could be rapidly deployed directly onto land due to the longships being able to land directly on beaches. The longship was the enabler of the Viking style of warfare that was fast and mobile, relying heavily on the element of surprise. The usual method was to approach a target with the element of surprise and then retire swiftly using guerrilla-style fighting. The fully armoured Viking raider would wear an iron helmet and a mail hauberk, and fight with a combination of axe, sword, shield, spear or great "Danish" two-handed axe, although the typical raider would be unarmoured, carrying only a bow and arrows, a seax, a shield and spear. European countries with a weak system of government would be unable to organize a suitable response and would naturally suffer the most to Viking raiders. Viking raiders always had the option to fall back in the face of a superior force or stubborn defence and then reappear to attack other locations or retreat to their bases. As time went on, Viking raids became more sophisticated, with coordinated strikes involving multiple forces and large armies, as the "Great Heathen Army" that ravaged Anglo-Saxon England in the 9th century. In time, the Vikings began to hold on to the areas they raided, first wintering and then consolidating footholds for further expansion later.

After the Vikings consolidated their kingdoms of Denmark, Norway, and Sweden, this period marks the end of significant raider activity both for plunder or conquest; adapting a more continental European tradition of warfare, whilst retaining an emphasis on naval power – the "Viking" clinker-built warship was used in the war until the 14th century. However, developments in shipbuilding elsewhere removed the advantage they previously enjoyed at sea, whilst castle building throughout frustrated and eventually ended Viking raids.

The Scandinavian armies of the High Middle Ages followed the usual pattern of the Northern European armies, but with a stronger emphasis on infantry. The terrain of Scandinavia favoured heavy infantry, and whilst the nobles fought mounted in the continental fashion, the Scandinavian peasants formed a well-armed and well-armoured infantry, of which approximately 30% to 50% would be archers or crossbowmen. The crossbow, the flatbow and the longbow were especially popular in Sweden and Finland. The chainmail, the lamellar armour and the coat of plates were the usual Scandinavian infantry armour before the era of plate armour.

=== Mongols ===
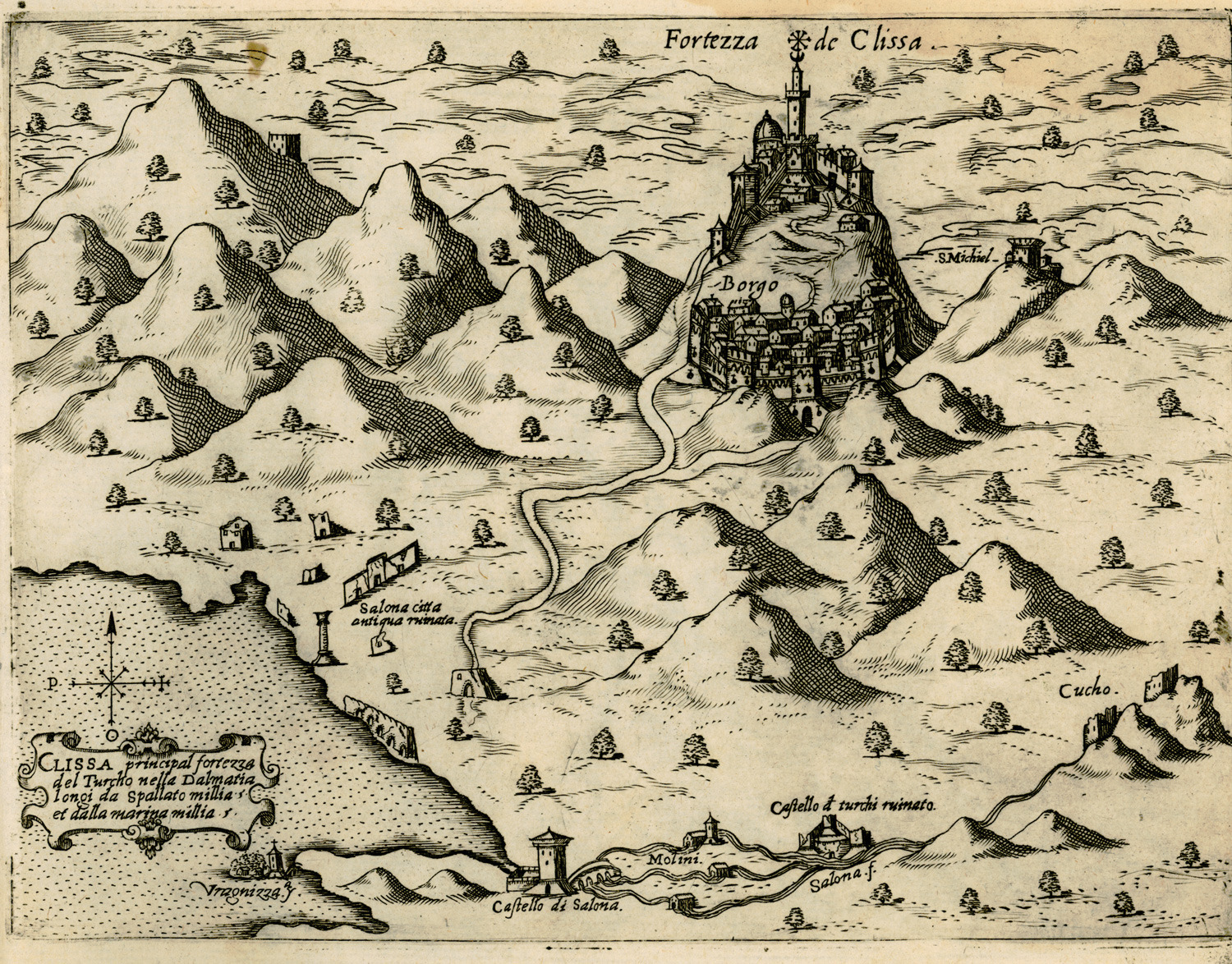
During The Mongol invasion of Europe, Tatars, under the leadership of Kadan, experienced a major failure in March 1242 at Klis Fortress in southern Croatia.

By 1241, having conquered large parts of Russia, the Mongols continued the invasion of Europe with a massive three-pronged advance, following the fleeing Cumans, who had established an uncertain alliance with King Bela IV of Hungary. They first invaded Poland, and finally, Hungary, culminating in the crushing defeat of the Hungarians in the Battle of Mohi. The Mongol aim seems to have consistently been to defeat the Hungarian-Cuman alliance. The Mongols raided across the borders to Austria and Bohemia in the summer when the Great Khan died, and the Mongol princes returned home to elect a new Great Khan.

The Golden Horde would frequently clash with Hungarians, Lithuanians and Poles in the thirteenth century, with two large raids in the 1260s and 1280s respectively. In 1284 the Hungarians repelled the last major raid into Hungary, and in 1287 the Poles repelled a raid against them. The instability in the Golden Horde seems to have quieted the western front of the Horde. Also, the large scale invasions and raiding that had previously characterized the expansion of the Mongols was cut short probably in some part due to the death of the last great Mongol leader, Tamerlane.

The Hungarians and Poles had responded to the mobile threat by extensive fortification-building, army reform in the form of better-armoured cavalry, and refusing battle unless they could control the site of the battlefield to deny the Mongols local superiority. The Lithuanians relied on their forested homelands for defence and used their cavalry for raiding into Mongol-dominated Russia. When attacking fortresses they would launch dead or diseased animals into fortresses to help spread disease.

=== Turks and Central Asia ===
An early Turkic group, the Seljuks, were known for their cavalry archers. These fierce nomads were often raiding empires, such as the Byzantine Empire, and they scored several victories using mobility and timing to defeat the heavy cataphracts of the Byzantines.

One notable victory was at Manzikert, where conflict among the generals of the Byzantines gave the Turks the perfect opportunity to strike. They hit the cataphracts with arrows, and outmanoeuvred them, then rode down their less mobile infantry with light cavalry that used scimitars (in use since the 9th century). When gunpowder was introduced, the Ottoman Turks of the Ottoman Empire hired the mercenaries that used the gunpowder weapons and obtained their instruction for the Janissaries. Out of these Ottoman soldiers rose the Janissaries (yeni ceri; "new soldier"), from which they also recruited many of their heavy infantry. Along with the use of cavalry and early grenades, the Ottomans mounted an offensive in the early Renaissance period and attacked Europe, taking Constantinople by massed infantry assaults.

Like many other nomadic peoples, the Turks featured a core of heavy cavalry from the upper classes. These evolved into the Sipahis (feudal landholders similar to western knights and Byzantine pronoiai) and Qapukulu (door slaves, taken from youth like Janissaries and trained to be royal servants and elite soldiers, mainly cataphracts).

Already by the late 13th century, the Khilji dynasty utilized several siege technologies such as trebuchets, ballistas and wooden parapets by their war engineers. In order to breach a fortification's curtain walls, long earthen-ramps were used to fill up moats. In ranged military techniques, they used the powerful war-horses from Central Asia with mounted archers.

== Equipment ==
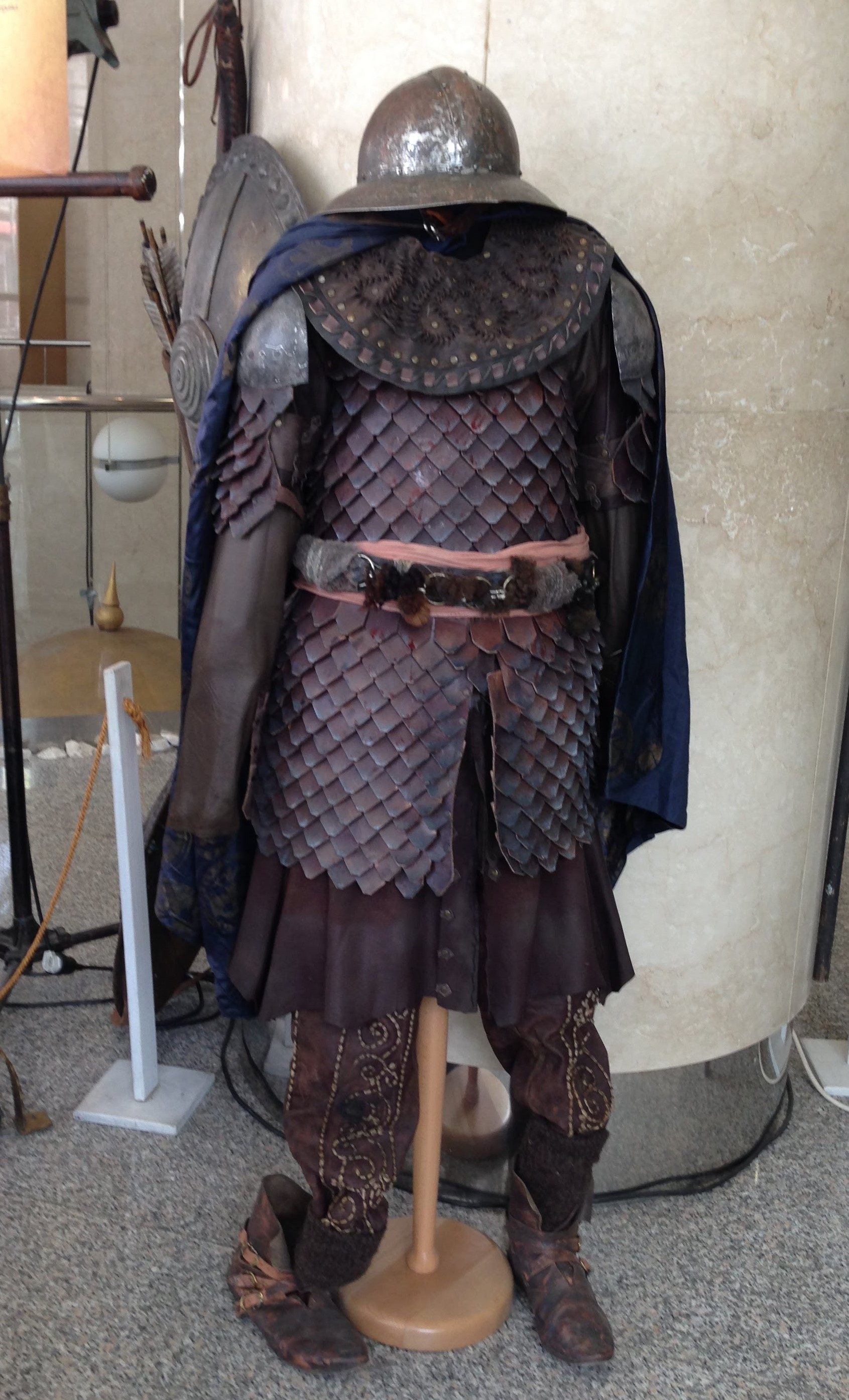
Replica of 12th century Serbian medieval armor

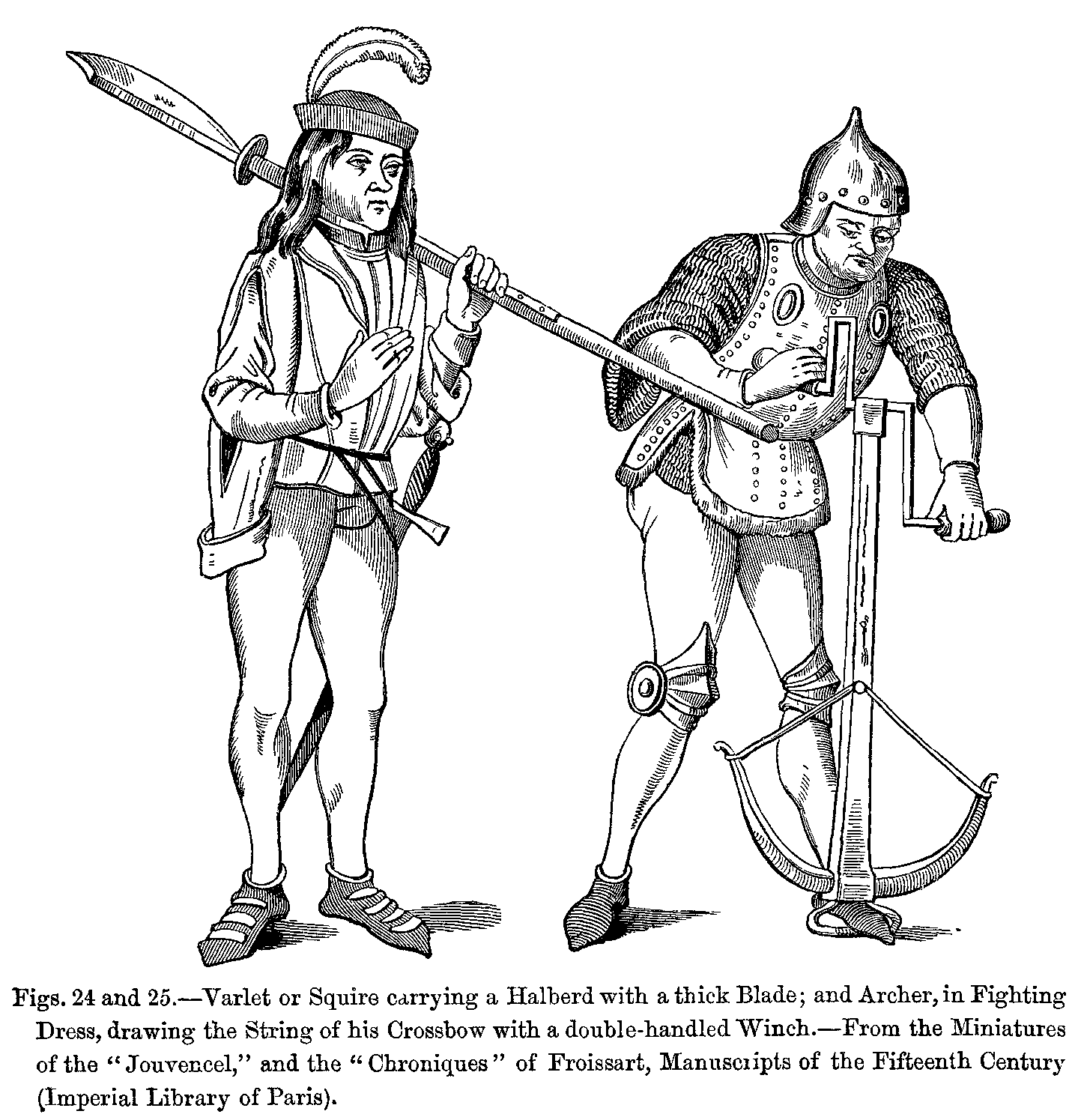
A varlet or squire carrying a halberd with a thick blade; and archer, in fighting dress, drawing the string of his crossbow with a double-handled winch. From the miniatures of the "Jouvencel", and Froissart's Chronicles. Imperial Library of Paris.

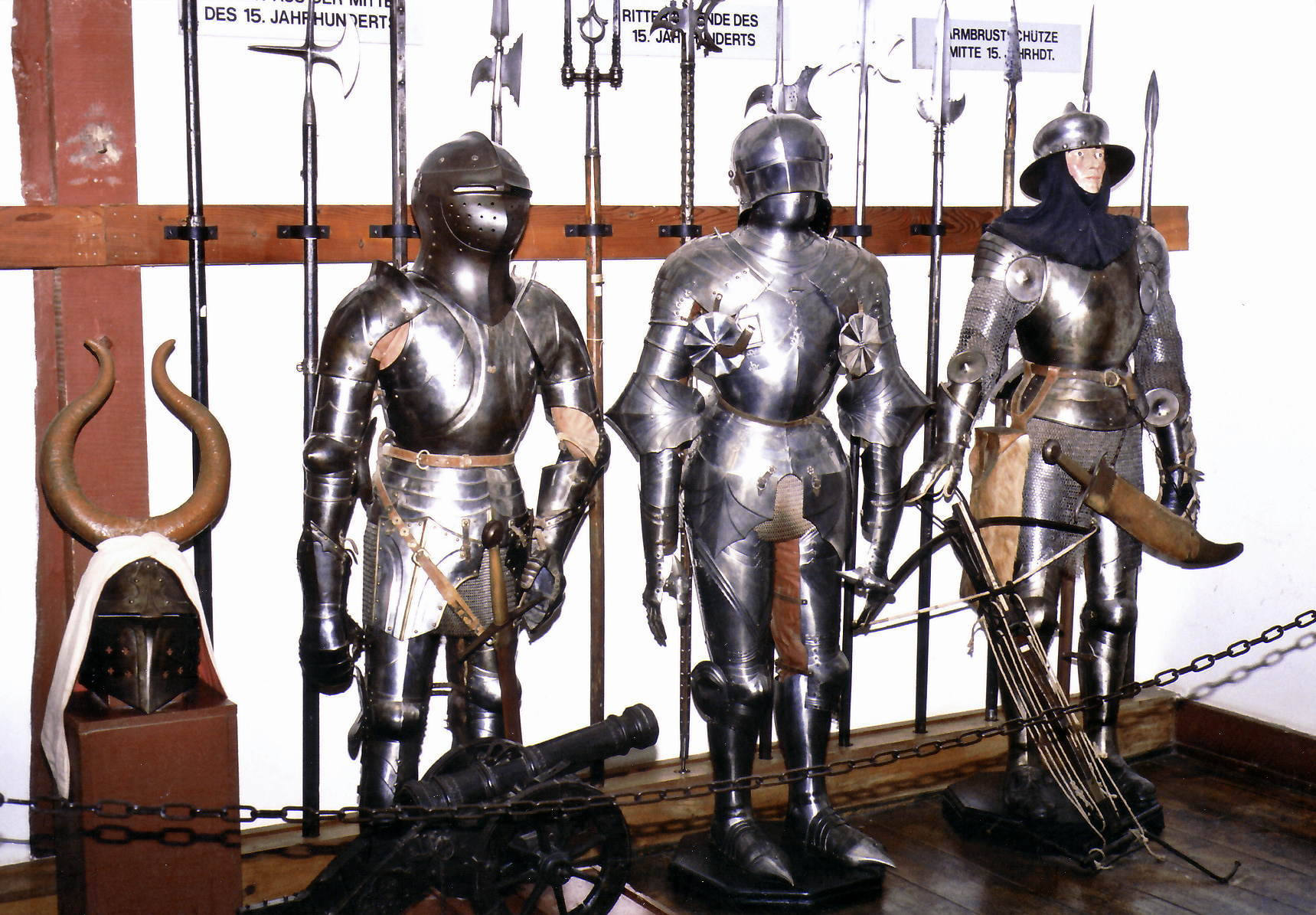
15th century armor from Germany

Weapons

Medieval weapons consisted of many different types of ranged and hand-held objects:

- Melee
  - Battleaxe
    - Horseman's pick
  - Blades
    - Arming sword
    - Dagger
    - Knife
    - Longsword
    - Messer
  - Blunt weapons
    - Club
    - Mace
    - War hammer
  - Polearm
    - Halberd
    - Lance
    - Military fork, the weaponized Pitchfork
    - Pollaxe
    - Spear
- Ranged
  - Bow
  - Longbow
  - Crossbow
  - Throwing axe
  - Throwing spear and Javelin
  - Sling

Armour

- Body armour
  - Leather
  - Fabric
  - Chain mail
  - Brigandine
  - Plate
- Shield
- Helmet

Artillery and Siege engine

- Battering ram
- Catapult
- Trebuchet
- Ballista
- Siege tower

Animals

- Camels in warfare
- Dogs in warfare
- Horses in warfare and Horses in the Middle Ages
- War elephant
- War pigs

== See also ==
- Endemic warfare
- Great Stirrup Controversy
- Horses in warfare
- Slighting
- Timeline of women in Medieval warfare
- Armored combat (sport)
