= Strategy (Liddell Hart book) =

1941 book by Basil Henry Liddell Hart

Strategy, also known as The Strategy of Indirect Approach, (1941) is a book by British military historian and military theorist Sir Basil Henry Liddell Hart.

== Description ==
In 1929, Liddell Hart published a study of the strategy of indirect approach titled The Decisive Wars of History. In 1941, he published a revised version under the title The Strategy of Indirect Approach. This edition significantly expanded its content, reiterating the original argument that the indirect approach is the most effective method of upsetting the opponent's physical and psychological balance, at the lowest cost and the minimum injury to the post-war period. Liddel Hart compares the views of Clausewitz and Lundendorff, who advocate totalitarian warfare aimed at the total annihilation of the enemy, with the view of Hitler, that the correct aim of a war leader should be to produce the capitulation of the enemy's armies with the least cost, if possible even without a battle. He considers Hitler as having an "acute grasp" of military strategy.

In 1954, Liddell Hart published a new edition titled simply Strategy, republished in 1967, and followed by many subsequent editions, well into the 21st century, as also his overall work continues to be reprinted and read, mainly by military officers.

== Reviews ==
Liddell Hart's biographer Alex Danchev remarked that Strategy is the closest the author ever came to writing a treatise on war, but it was "started too soon, distended too much and finished—or unfinished—too late to produce a truly satisfying whole." Other reviewers contented that "imperfect though it may be, Liddell Hart’s Strategy offers important takes on modern warfare still worth considering today."

== See also ==
- Indirect approach
