= Peter Farrer =

English actor, 1926-2017

- Peter Farrer

Personal details
- Born: 20 May 1926
- Died: 10 February 2017 (aged 90)

Peter Farrer (20 May 1926 – 10 February 2017) was an English actor. Shortly following Farrer's death in 2017, his archive papers and collections of research materials were donated to LJMU Special Collections & Archives as a bequest. In 2016 Peter Farrer also donated his borrowed copies of The Family Doctor, lent to him by the military historian Sir Basil Liddell Hart for use in Farrer's research due to their frequent mention of both male and female roles and discussions of the intersections between fashion and health, often in relation to corsetry and tight lacing. Many items from Farrer's garment collection are now owned by National Museums Liverpool, where they were displayed in 2015 and 2017-2018.

== Selected publications ==
- The Life of Maurice Pollack, 1885-1918: A Birmingham Actor
- Cross Dressing Between the Wars: Selections from London Life 1923-1933
- In Female Disguise
- My First Party Frock and Other Contributions to the Glad Rag 1985 to 1991
- The Regime of the Stay-lace: Further Selection of Letters from Victorian Newspapers
- Men in Petticoats: A Selection of Letters from Victorian Newspapers
- Borrowed Plumes: Letters from Edwardian Newspapers on Male Cross Dressing
- Tight Lacing: 1828-1880 Pt. 1: A Bibliography of Articles and Letters Concerning Stays and Corsets for Men and Women
- Confidential Correspondence on Cross Dressing: 1911-15 Pt. 1
- Cross Dressing Since the War: Selections from Justice Weekly 1955-1972
- Confidential Correspondence on Cross Dressing: 1916-20 Pt. 2
- Happenings: The Story of Bessie
