= Osinga =

Osinga is a surname. Notable people with the surname include:

- Frans Osinga (born 1963), professor active in the Netherlands
- Hinke Osinga (born 1969), Dutch mathematician, professor and artist
