= Strategy (disambiguation) =

A strategy is a long term plan of action designed to achieve a particular overarching goal.

Strategy may also refer to:

== Game theory ==
- Strategy (game theory), the complete plan of action in a game or a business situation
  - Mixed strategy, game-theory strategy which chooses randomly between possible moves
  - Evolutionarily stable strategy, term from evolutionary game theory

== Business ==
- Corporate strategy, a series of top-level management decisions which help navigate the direction of the corporation in terms of products, markets, promotion and price levels
- Business strategy, the art and science of enabling an organization to achieve its objective
  - Marketing strategy, a process that allows an organization to increase sales and achieve a competitive advantage
  - Technology strategy, how information technology should be used as part of a business strategy
- Trading strategy, predefined set of rules to apply in finance
- Strategy&, formerly consulting firm Booz & Company, now the strategy consulting business unit of PricewaterhouseCoopers
- Strategy, a DBA name for MicroStrategy
- Strategy (magazine), Canadian business magazine
- Blue Ocean Strategy, a marketing theory book

== Gaming ==
- American football strategy
- Chess strategy, evaluation of positions, setting goals and long-term plans for future play
- Poker strategy
- Strategy game, a game in which the players' decision-making skills determine the outcome, rather than chance
  - Strategy video game, in which the players' long-term planning skills, rather than reflexes, determine the outcome

== Geopolitics and military planning ==
- Geostrategy, a foreign policy guided principally by geographical factors pertaining to political and military planning
- Grand strategy, military strategy at the level of an entire nation state or empire's resources
- Military strategy
  - Fabian strategy, military strategy that favors a war of attrition and indirection
- Naval strategy
- Nuclear strategy
- Strategy (Svechin book) (1923)
- Strategy (Liddell Hart book) (1954)

== Music ==
- Strategy (Level 42 album) (1982)
- Strategy (Pier Gonella album) (2020)
- Strategy (EP), by Twice (2024)
- "Strategy" (song), by Twice featuring Megan Thee Stallion

== Other uses ==
- Strategy pattern, design pattern in computer science
- Strategy (TV series), Canadian television game show (1969)
- Coping strategies in psychology, aimed at solving problems and minimizing or tolerating stress & conflict
