= B. H. Liddell Hart =

British historian and military theorist (1895–1970)

Sir Basil Liddell Hart
- Born: 31 October 1895; Paris, France
- Died: 29 January 1970 (aged 74); Marlow, Buckinghamshire, England
- Resting place: St Peter and St Paul Churchyard, Medmenham, Buckinghamshire, England
- Education: Corpus Christi College, Cambridge
- Occupations: Soldier, military historian
- Spouse: Jessie Stone (m. 1918) Kathleen Sullivan (m. 1942)
- Children: Adrian Liddell Hart
- Military career
- Branch: British Army
- Service years: 1914–1927
- Rank: Captain
- Conflicts: First World War: Battle of the Somme

Sir Basil Henry Liddell Hart (31 October 1895 – 29 January 1970), commonly known as Captain B. H. Liddell Hart, was a British soldier, military historian and military theorist. He wrote a series of military histories that proved influential among strategists. Arguing that frontal assault was bound to fail at great cost in lives, as proven in the First World War, he recommended the "indirect approach" and reliance on fast-moving armoured formations.

His pre-war publications are known to have influenced German strategy in the Second World War, though he was accused of prompting captured generals to exaggerate his part in the development of blitzkrieg tactics. He also helped promote the Rommel myth and the "clean Wehrmacht" argument for political purposes, when the Cold War necessitated the recruitment of a new West German army.

== Life ==
Liddell Hart was born in Paris, the son of a Methodist minister. His name at birth was Basil Henry Hart; he added "Liddell" to his surname in 1921. His mother's side of the family, the Liddells, came from Liddesdale, on the Scottish side of the border with England, and were associated with the London and South Western Railway. The Harts were farmers from Gloucestershire and Herefordshire.

As a child, Liddell Hart was fascinated by aviation. He received his formal academic education at Willington School in Putney, St Paul's School in London, and Corpus Christi College, Cambridge, where he was a student of Geoffrey Butler.

=== First World War ===
When the First World War began in August 1914, Liddell Hart volunteered for the British Army, wherein he became an officer in the King's Own Yorkshire Light Infantry in December and served with the regiment on the Western Front. Liddell Hart's front line experience was relatively brief, confined to two short spells in the autumn and winter of 1915, being sent home from the front after suffering concussive injuries from a shell burst. He was promoted to the rank of captain.

He returned to the front for a third time in 1916, in time to participate in the Battle of the Somme. He was hit three times without serious injury before being badly gassed and sent out of the line on 19 July 1916. His battalion was nearly wiped out on the first day of the offensive on 1 July, a part of the 60,000 casualties suffered in the heaviest single day's loss in British history. The experiences he suffered on the Western Front profoundly affected him for the rest of his life.

Transferred to be adjutant of Volunteer units in Stroud and Cambridge which trained new recruits, he wrote several booklets on infantry drill and training, which came to the attention of General Sir Ivor Maxse, commander of the 18th (Eastern) Division. After the war, he transferred to the Royal Army Educational Corps, where he prepared a new edition of the Infantry Training Manual. In it, Liddell Hart strove to instil the lessons of 1918, and carried on a correspondence with Maxse, a commanding officer during the battles of Hamel and Amiens.

=== Journalist and military historian ===
Liddell Hart was placed on half-pay from June 1924. He retired from the army as a captain on 4 July 1927. Two mild heart attacks in 1921 and 1922, probably the long-term effects of his gassing, precluded his further advancement in the small post-war army. He spent the rest of his career as a theorist and writer. In 1924, he became a lawn tennis correspondent and assistant military correspondent for The Morning Post, covering Wimbledon; and in 1926, published a collection of his tennis writings as The Lawn Tennis Masters Unveiled. He worked as the military correspondent of The Daily Telegraph from 1925 to 1935 and of The Times from 1935 to 1939.

In the mid-to-late 1920s Liddell Hart wrote a series of histories of major military figures through which he advanced his ideas that the frontal assault was a strategy bound to fail at great cost in lives. He argued that the tremendous losses Britain suffered in the Great War were caused by its commanding officers not appreciating that fact of history. He believed the British decision in 1914 of directly intervening on the Continent with a great army was a mistake. He claimed that historically, "the British way in warfare" was to leave Continental land battles to her allies, intervening only through naval power, with the army fighting the enemy away from its principal front in a "limited liability" commitment.

In his early writings on mechanised warfare, Liddell Hart proposed that infantry be carried along with the fast-moving armoured formations. He described them as "tank marines" like the soldiers the Royal Navy carried with their ships. He proposed they be carried along in their own tracked vehicles and dismount to help take better-defended positions that otherwise would hold up the armoured units. That doctrine, similar to the mechanized infantry of later decades, contrasted with J.F.C. Fuller's ideas of a tank army, which put heavy emphasis on massed armoured formations. Liddell Hart foresaw the need for a combined arms force with mobile infantry and artillery, which was similar but not identical to the make-up of the panzer divisions that Guderian developed in Nazi Germany.

According to Liddell Hart's memoirs, in a series of articles for The Times from November 1935 to November 1936, he had argued that Britain's role in the next European war should be entrusted to the Royal Air Force (RAF). He theorised that the RAF could defeat her enemies while avoiding the high casualties and the limited influence that would come from Britain placing a large conscript army on the Continent. The ideas influenced Neville Chamberlain (then Chancellor of the Exchequer and from May 1937 to May 1940 Prime Minister), who argued in discussions of the 'Defence Policy and Requirements Committee' for a strong air force, rather than a large army that would fight on the Continent.

Becoming prime minister, Chamberlain placed Liddell Hart in a position of influence behind British grand strategy in the late 1930s. In May, Liddell Hart prepared schemes for the reorganisation of the British Army for the defence of the British Empire and delivered them to Sir Thomas Inskip, Minister for the Coordination of Defence. In June, Liddell Hart gained an introduction to the Secretary of State for War, Leslie Hore-Belisha. Through July 1938 the two had an unofficial, close advisory relationship. Liddell Hart provided Hore-Belisha with ideas, which he would argue for in Cabinet or committees.

On 20 October 1937, Chamberlain wrote to Hore-Belisha, "I have been reading in Europe in Arms by Liddell Hart. If you have not already done so you might find it interesting to glance at this, especially the chapter on the 'Role of the British Army'". Hore-Belisha wrote in reply: "I immediately read the 'Role of the British Army' in Liddell Hart's book. I am impressed by his general theories".

With the German invasion of Poland in September 1939, the Chamberlain war ministry reversed the Chamberlain policy advanced by Liddell Hart. With Europe on the brink of war and Germany threatening an invasion of Poland, the cabinet chose instead to advocate a British and Imperial army of 55 divisions to intervene on the Continent by coming to the aid of Poland, Norway and France.

=== Post-war ===
After the war, Liddell Hart was responsible for extensive interviews and debriefs for several high-ranking German generals, who were held by the western Allies as prisoners-of-war in Trent Park. Liddell Hart provided commentary on their outlook. The work was published as The Other Side of the Hill (UK edition, 1948) and The German Generals Talk (condensed US edition, 1948).

A few years later, Liddell Hart had the opportunity to review the notes that Erwin Rommel had kept during the war. Rommel (forced to suicide 14 October 1944) had kept the notes with the intention of writing of his experiences after the war. The Rommel family had previously published the notes in German, as War without Hate in 1950. Some of the notes had been destroyed by Rommel, and the other notes, including Rommel's letters to his wife, had been confiscated by American authorities. With Liddell Hart's help, they were later returned to Rommel's widow.

Liddell Hart then edited and condensed the book and helped integrate the new material. The writings, along with notes and commentary by former General Fritz Bayerlein and Liddell Hart, were published in 1953 as The Rommel Papers. (See below) In 1954, Liddell Hart published his most influential work, Strategy. (Note: This history of this work is involved, as it has multiple titles and editions. Later versions are known as Strategy: The Indirect Approach as well. Danchev notes the first version was developed in 1929 and was rewritten and updated in 1941, 1946, 1954, and 1967.) It was followed by a second expanded edition in 1967. The book was largely devoted to a historical study of the indirect approach and in what ways various battles and campaigns could be analyzed using that concept. Still relevant at the turn of the century, it was a factor in the development of the British manoeuvre warfare doctrine.

In 1966, Queen Elizabeth II made Liddell Hart a Knight Bachelor in the New Year Honours. As of 1977, Liddell Hart's personalised 19th and early 20th Century fashion collection was donated to the Liverpool Polytechnic, and is now maintained by Liverpool John Moores University Special Collections & Archives (LJMU SCA). Additional deposits were made to this collection when LJMU SCA was able to later purchase Liddell Hart's entire fashion book collection from Adrian Liddell Hart, and in 2016 when Peter Farrer donated volumes of The Family Doctor and other publications he had previously borrowed from Liddell Hart for his research on crossdressing history. As of 2009, Liddell Hart's personal papers and library form the central collection in the Liddell Hart Centre for Military Archives at King's College London.

== Key ideas and observations ==
[N]ot of one period but of its whole course, points to the fact that, in all decisive campaigns, the dislocation of the enemy's psychological and physical balance has been the vital prelude to his overthrow.

— B. H. Liddell Hart

Liddell Hart was an advocate of the notion that it is easier to succeed in war by an indirect approach. To attack where the opponent expects, as Liddell Hart explained, makes the task of winning harder: "To move along the line of natural expectation consolidates the opponent's balance and thus increases his resisting power". That is in contrast to an indirect approach, in which physical or psychological surprise is a component: "The indirectness is usually physical and always psychological. In strategy, the longest way round is often the shortest way home".

Liddell Hart would illustrate the notion with historical examples. For example, Liddell Hart considered the Battle of Leuctra, won by Epaminondas, an example of an indirect approach. Rather than weighting his army on the right wing, as was standard at the time, Epaminondas weighted his left wing, held back his right wing and routed the Spartan army. A more modern example would be the landings of the Allies at Normandy on 6 June 1944, as the Germans were expecting a landing in the vicinity of Pas-de-Calais. By contrast, an example of a direct attack, in Liddell Hart's eyes, was the attack by Union forces at the Battle of Fredericksburg in 1862.

Even more impressive in Liddell Hart's eyes was the further campaign by Epaminondas, his invasion of the Peloponnese, in which in winter and in separate columns, he invaded Spartan controlled territory. He was unable to draw the Spartans into combat and so settled on freeing helots. He then built two city states as a break against Spartan power and so the campaign was successful. By breaking the Spartan economic base, he won a campaign without ever fighting a battle.

When analyzing the campaigns of Napoleon, Liddell Hart noted that his approaches were less subtle and more brute force as his forces became larger and that when his forces were lesser, he was more apt to be creative in his battles. Constant victory seemed to have dulled Napoleon's skills as a soldier.

According to Reid, Liddell Hart's indirect approach has seven key themes.:

- The dislocation of the enemy's balance should be the prelude to defeat, not to utter destruction.
- Negotiate an end to unprofitable wars.
- The methods of the indirect approach are better suited to democracy.
- Military power relies on economic endurance. Defeating an enemy by beating him economically incurs no risk.
- Implicitly, war is an activity between states.
- Liddell Hart's notion of "rational pacifism".
- Victory often emerges as the result of an enemy defeating itself.

== Influence ==
During the 1960s Liddell Hart's reputation reached extraordinary heights. When he visited Israel in 1960 his trip stimulated more public interest than that of any other foreign visitor except Marilyn Monroe.

— Brian Holden Reid

Liddell Hart's reputation as a military thinker stood very high at his death in 1970. Post-mortem assessments, however, have been more ambivalent.

— Christopher Bassford

At the height of his popularity, John F. Kennedy called Liddell Hart "the Captain who teaches Generals" and was using his writings to attack the Eisenhower administration, which he said was too dependent on nuclear arms. Liddell Hart influence extended to armies outside the UK and the US as well. Baumgarten stated of Liddell Hart's influence in the Australian Army: "The indirect approach was also one of the key influences on the development of manoeuvre theory, a dominant element in Army thinking throughout the 1990s". Retired Pakistani General Shaafat Shah called Liddell Hart's book Strategy: the Indirect Approach "A seminal work of military history and theory".

In the book Science, Strategy and War published 2006, Frans Osinga wrote while he mentioned John Boyd, "In his recently published study of modern strategic theory, Colin Gray ranked Boyd among the outstanding general theorists of the strategy of the 20th century, along with the likes of Bernard Brodie, Edward Luttwak, Basil Liddell Hart and John Wylie". In 1998, his biographer Alex Danchev noted that Liddell Hart's books were still being translated all around the world, some of them 70 years after they had been written.

== Controversies ==
=== Influence on Panzerwaffe ===
Following the Second World War Liddell Hart pointed out that the German Wehrmacht adopted theories developed from those of J. F. C. Fuller and from his own, and that it used them against the Allies in Blitzkrieg warfare. Some scholars, such as the political scientist John Mearsheimer, have questioned the extent of the influence which the British officers, and in particular Liddell Hart, had in the development of the method of war practised by the Panzerwaffe in 1939–1941. During the post-war debriefs of the former Wehrmacht generals, Liddell Hart attempted to tease out his influence on their war practices. Following these interviews, many of the generals said that Liddell Hart had been an influence on their strategies, something that had not been claimed previously nor has any contemporary, pre-war, documentation been found to support their assertions. Liddell Hart thus put "words in the mouths of German Generals" with the aim, according to Mearsheimer, to "resurrect a lost reputation".

Shimon Naveh, the founder and former head of the Israel Defense Forces' Operational Theory Research Institute, stated that after World War II Liddell Hart "created" the idea of Blitzkrieg as a military doctrine: "It was the opposite of a doctrine. Blitzkrieg consisted of an avalanche of actions that were sorted out less by design and more by success." Naveh stated that,

by manipulation and contrivance, Liddell Hart distorted the actual circumstances of the Blitzkrieg formation and obscured its origins. Through his indoctrinated idealization of an ostentatious concept, he reinforced the myth of Blitzkrieg. By imposing, retrospectively, his own perceptions of mobile warfare upon the shallow concept of Blitzkrieg, he created a theoretical imbroglio that has taken 40 years to unravel.

In 1997, Naveh stated that in his letters to German generals Erich von Manstein and Guderian, as well as to relatives and associates of Rommel, Liddell Hart "imposed his own fabricated version of Blitzkrieg on the latter and compelled him to proclaim it as original formula".

Naveh pointed out that the edition of Guderian's memoirs published in Germany differed from the one published in the United Kingdom. Guderian neglected to mention the influence of the English theorists such as Fuller and Liddell Hart in the German-language versions. One example of the influence of these men on Guderian was the report on the Battle of Cambrai published by Fuller in 1920, who at the time served as a staff officer at the Royal Tank Corps. Liddell Hart alleged that his findings and theories on armoured warfare were read and later taken in by Guderian, which thus helped to formulate the basis of operations that would become known as Blitzkrieg warfare. These tactics involved deep penetration of the armoured formations supported behind enemy lines by bomb-carrying aircraft. Dive bombers were the principal agents of delivery of high explosives in support of the forward units.

Though the German version of the Guderian memoirs mentions Liddell Hart, it did not ascribe to him his role in developing the theories behind armoured warfare. An explanation for the difference between the two translations can be found in the correspondence between the two men. In one letter to Guderian, Liddell Hart reminded the German general that he should provide him the credit he was due, offering "You might care to insert a remark that I emphasise the use of armoured forces for long-range operations against the opposing Army's communications, and also the proposed type of armoured division combining Panzer and Panzer-infantry units – and that these points particularly impressed you."

Richard M. Swain comments that while some arguments against Liddell Hart's thinking are deserved, Liddell Hart the man himself was not a knave and Mearsheimer's attempt of character assassination is unwarranted.

Historian Jay Luvaas commented in 1990 that Liddell Hart and Fuller did actually anticipate the role of the armoured forces in a blitzkrieg. Luvaas opined that Liddell Hart overestimated, in a sincere way, his influence on German generals, but the fact that many military leaders in Germany and other countries, including generals like Yigal Allon and Andre Beaufre, knew about his theories and considered his opinions worth thinking about is true. According to Luvaas, von Mellenthin recounted that Rommel mentioned Liddell Hart many times and had a good opinion about him – although, in Luvaas's opinion, this would not make him a pupil. Luvass saw Liddell Hart as a scholar who needed public recognition and influence, but also a naturally generous person whose efforts in building a connection to other people should not be assigned motives without evidence.

Joseph Forbes dismissed the claim that Liddell Hart, Guderian and Rommel's friends and relatives were in a conspiracy to misrepresent Liddell Hart's influence as baseless insinuations, considering that: Liddell Hart's chapter on Guderian quotes Guderian as having faith in the theories of Hobart and not of Liddell Hart; the fact that Desmond Young once recommended Liddell Hart to Manfred Rommel as a person who might help to publish his father's memoirs should not be used as proof that there was a conspiracy to give undue recognition to Liddell Hart; and the whole book The German Generals Talk contains one statement about Liddell Hart's influence. According to Forbes, Mearsheimer relies less on the actual text than on Frank Mahin's review, to make the claim that Hart fills the book with fabricated comments by Germans to exaggerate his role.

=== Role in Rommel myth ===
Liddell Hart was instrumental in the creation of the "Rommel myth", a view that the German field marshal Erwin Rommel was an apolitical, brilliant commander and a victim of the Third Reich due to his participation in the 20 July plot against Adolf Hitler.

The myth was initially fueled by Nazi propagandists, with Rommel's participation, as a means of praising the Wehrmacht and instilling optimism in the German public. Starting in 1941, it was picked up by the British press and disseminated in the West as an element of explaining Britain's continued inability to defeat the Axis forces in the North Africa campaign.

Following the war, the Western Allies, and particularly the British, depicted Rommel as the "good German" and "our friend Rommel". His reputation for conducting a clean war was used to support West German rearmament and reconciliation between the former enemies – Britain and the United States on one side and the new Federal Republic on the other.

After the outbreak of the Korean War in 1950, it became clear to the Americans and the British that a German army would have to be revived to help face off against the Soviet Union. Many former German officers were convinced that no future German army would be possible without the rehabilitation of the Wehrmacht. Thus, in the atmosphere of the Cold War, Rommel's former enemies, especially the British, played a key role in the manufacture and propagation of the myth.

German rearmament was highly dependent upon an image boost that the Wehrmacht needed. Liddell Hart, an early proponent of these two interconnected initiatives, provided the first widely available source on Rommel in his 1948 book on Hitler's generals. He devoted a chapter to Rommel, portraying him as an outsider to the Nazi regime. Additions to the chapter published in 1951 concluded with laudatory comments about Rommel's "gifts and performance" that "qualified him for a place in the role of the 'Great Captains' of history".

1953 saw the publication of Rommel's war writings in The Rommel Papers, edited by Liddell Hart, the former Wehrmacht officer Fritz Bayerlein, and Rommel's widow and son, with an introduction by Liddell Hart. The historian Mark Connelly argues that The Rommel Papers was one of the two foundational works that led to a "Rommel renaissance", the other being Desmond Young's biography Rommel: The Desert Fox. (Note: Connelly also uses the term "Anglophone rehabilitation".) The book contributed to the perception of Rommel as a brilliant commander. In an introduction, Liddell Hart drew comparisons between Rommel and Lawrence of Arabia, "two masters of desert warfare", according to Liddell Hart.

Liddell Hart's work on the book was also self-serving: he had coaxed Rommel's widow into adding material that suggested that Rommel was influenced by Liddell Hart's theories on mechanised warfare, making Rommel his "pupil" and giving Liddell Hart credit for Rommel's dramatic successes in 1940. The controversy was described by the political scientist John Mearsheimer in his work The Weight of History. A review of Mearsheimer's work, published by the Strategic Studies Institute, pointed out that Mearsheimer "correctly takes 'The Captain' [Liddell Hart] to task for ... manipulating history".

According to Connelly, Young and Liddell Hart laid the foundation for the Anglo-American myth, which consisted of three themes: Rommel's ambivalence towards Nazism; his military genius; and the emphasis of the chivalrous nature of the fighting in North Africa. Their works lent support to the image of the "clean Wehrmacht" and were generally not questioned, since they came from British authors, rather than German revisionists. (Note: Kitchen: "The North African campaign has usually been seen, as in the title of Rommel's account, as 'War without Hate', and thus as further proof that the German army was not involved in any sordid butchering, which was left to Himmler's SS. While it was perfectly true that the German troops in North Africa fought with great distinction and gallantry, ... it was fortunate for their subsequent reputation that the SS murderers that followed in their wake did not have an opportunity to get to work." Kitchen further explains that the sparsely populated desert areas did not lend themselves to ethnic cleansing; that the German forces never reached Egypt and Palestine that had large Jewish populations; and that, in the urban areas of Tunisia and Tripolitania, the Italian government constrained the German efforts to discriminate against or eliminate Jews who were Italian citizens.)

=== MI5 controversy ===
On 4 September 2006, MI5 files were released which showed that in early 1944 MI5 had suspicions that plans for the D-Day invasion had been leaked. Liddell Hart had prepared a treatise titled Some Reflections on the Problems of Invading the Continent which he circulated amongst political and military figures. It is possible that in his treatise Liddell Hart had correctly deduced a number of aspects of the upcoming Allied invasion, including the location of the landings. MI5 suspected that Liddell Hart had received plans of the invasion from General Sir Alfred "Tim" Pile who was in command of Britain's anti-aircraft defences.

MI5 placed him under surveillance, intercepting his telephone calls and letters. The investigation showed no suggestion that Liddell Hart was involved in any subversive activity. No case was ever brought against Pile. Liddell Hart stated his work was merely speculative. It would appear that Liddell Hart had simply perceived the same problems and arrived at similar conclusions as the Allied general staff.

== Personal life ==
In April 1918, Liddell Hart married Jessie Stone, the daughter of J. J. Stone, who had been his assistant adjutant at Stroud. Their son Adrian was born in 1922. In 1942, he married Kathleen Sullivan, who remained his wife until his death.

He died on 29 January 1970 at the age of 74 at his home in Marlow, Buckinghamshire.

== Biographies ==
- Alex Danchev wrote the biography of Liddell Hart, Alchemist of War: The Life of Basil Liddell Hart, with the cooperation of Liddell Hart's widow.
- Brian Bond wrote Liddell Hart: A Study of His Military Thought (Cassell, 1977; Rutgers University Press, 1977).
- John J. Mearsheimer's Liddell Hart and the Weight of History (New York, 1988), published by the Cornell University Press and part of the Cornell Studies in Security Affairs, uses primary evidence to look at Liddell Hart's claims to have predicted the fall of France by Blitzkrieg tactics and that he was influential with German generals and thinkers (notably Guderian and Rommel) in the 1930s, offering a revisionist view.

== Works ==
- Paris or the Future of War (1925)
- Scipio Africanus: Greater Than Napoleon (originally: A Greater than Napoleon: Scipio Africanus (William Blackwood and Sons, London, 1926; Biblio and Tannen, New York, 1976)
- Lawn Tennis Masters Unveiled (Arrowsmith, London, 1926)
- The Remaking of Modern Armies (John Murray, London, 1927)
- Great Captains Unveiled (William Blackwood and Sons, London, 1927; Greenhill, London, 1989)
- Reputations 10 Years After (Little, Brown, Boston, 1928)
- Sherman: Soldier, Realist, American (Dodd, Mead and Co, New York, 1929; Frederick A. Praeger, New York, 1960). Issued in the UK as Sherman, The Genius of the Civil War (Ernest Benn, London, 1930)
- The Decisive Wars of History (1929) (This is the first part of the later: Strategy: The Indirect Approach)
- The Real War 1914–1918 (1930), reprinted as A History of the World War 1914–1918 (1934); later republished as History of the First World War (1970).
- Foch: The Man of Orleans (Eyre & Spottiswoode, London, 1931)
- The British Way in Warfare (Faber & Faber, London, 1932), Enlarged second edition issued as When Britain Goes to War (1936)
- The Ghost of Napoleon (Yale University, New Haven, 1934)
- T. E. Lawrence in Arabia and After (Jonathan Cape, London, 1934 – online)
- World War I in Outline (1936)
- The Defence of Britain (Faber and Faber, London, Fall 1939 (after the German war against Poland); Greenwood, Westport, 1980). German edition:

Die Verteidigung Gross-Britanniens. Zürich 1939.

- The Current of War, London: Hutchinson, 1941
- The Strategy of Indirect Approach (1941, reprinted in 1942 under the title: The Way to Win Wars)
- The Way to Win Wars (1942)
- Why Don't We Learn From History?, London: George Allen and Unwin, 1944
- The Revolution in Warfare, London: Faber and Faber, 1946
- The Other Side of the Hill: Germany's Generals. Their Rise and Fall, with their own Account of Military Events 1939–1945, London: Cassel, 1948; enlarged and revised edition, Delhi: Army Publishers, 1965; pub. in the United States as The German Generals Talk: Startling Revelations from Hitler's High Command (1971 ed.). William Morrow. 1948. ISBN 978-0-688-06012-1.
- The Letters of Private Wheeler 1809–1828 (editor), London: Michael Joseph, 1951
- "Foreword" to Heinz Guderian's Panzer Leader (New York: Da Capo, 1952)
- Strategy, second revised edition, London: Faber and Faber, 1954, 1967.
- The Rommel Papers, (editor), 1953
- The Tanks – A History of the Royal Tank Regiment and its Predecessors: Volumes I and II (Praeger, New York, 1959)
- "Foreword" to Samuel B. Griffith's Sun Tzu: the Art of War (Oxford University Press, London, 1963)
- The Memoirs of Captain Liddell Hart: Volumes I and II (Cassell, London, 1965)
- History of the Second World War (London, Weidenfeld Nicolson, 1970)
