= Adrian Liddell Hart =

British Royal Navy officer and politician

Adrian John Liddell Hart (1922–1991) was a British soldier, Royal Navy officer, Liberal Party politician, author and adventurer. He served briefly in the French Foreign Legion and portrayed it in the 1953 book Strange Company.

== Early life and career ==
The son of Sir Basil Liddell Hart (1895–1970), by his first wife Jessie Stone, Liddell Hart was the godson of Major-General J. F. C. Fuller, and was educated at St Andrew's School, Pangbourne, before Eton and King's College, Cambridge. With the outbreak of the Second World War in 1939 he joined the British Army and in 1940 became adjutant of the Local Defence Volunteers at Dartington, Devon. In 1941, he joined the trained Royal Naval Volunteer Reserve and after training at HMS Collingwood, Fareham, he was selected as an officer candidate.

After obligatory sea time as a junior rank on the Flower-class corvette Carnation during which he saw service in the Battle of the Atlantic, he was commissioned and attended the RNVR officer training course at HMS King Alfred in Hove, Sussex. He was promoted to sub lieutenant on HMS Jamaica in 1942 and saw active service in the Mediterranean in 1943, before joining the Combined Operations Command of British North African Forces later that year and the Signal Division of the Admiralty in London from 1943 to 1944, then HMS Coldstreamer and HMS Guardsman later in 1944. In 1945, he was appointed flag lieutenant to the admiral commanding Iceland.

== Later career ==
From 1945 to 1946 Liddell Hart was assistant editor to the Preparatory Commission of the United Nations, and, from 1946 to 1947, was a political affairs officer of the United Nations Organisation, based in New York.

He next joined the Control Service for Germany, attached to the British Army of the Rhine, and the administrative staff headquarters of the Allied Control Council (British sector). He worked for the original Outward Bound Sea School in 1949 and as the House of Commons lobby correspondent of The Yorkshire Observer from 1949 to 1950.

Under the name of Peter Brand, Liddell Hart served in the French Foreign Legion as an ordinary legionnaire from 1950 to 1951, then in the Legion's First Foreign Cavalry Regiment in French Indo China. In 1952 he took a job with the Outward Bound Trust at Aberdyfi, Gwynedd, and, from 1953 to 1954, worked in the Canadian oil industry.

From 1955 to 1956, he was with the Canadian Broadcasting Corporation in Toronto, before joining the Federation of British Industry from 1959 to 1960, when he was appointed Assistant Director of the Society of British Aircraft Constructors. In 1962, he became an Analyst in London for Gordon Rayment and Co. Ltd., and in 1963 Assistant General Secretary of the United Nations Association International Service.

He was a public relations executive for Informat from 1965 to 1966, then in 1968 joined St John's House, London, a hostel for homeless young offenders. In 1971 he was briefly Warden of the Elswick Lodge Rehabilitation Centre in Newcastle upon Tyne.

In later life he lived in Stroud, Gloucestershire, where he died in 1991.

== Politics ==
At the 1945 general election, Liddell Hart was the Liberal candidate for Blackpool South, and at the 1950 general election was the party's candidate for Sowerby. On both occasions, he was defeated.

== Works ==
Books

- The Growth of New Germany (1949)
- Strange Company (1953)
- The Sword and the Pen: Selections From the World's Greatest Military Writings (1975)
