= Alex Danchev =

British historian and biographer

- Born: 26 August 1955; Bolton, Lancashire
- Died: 7 August 2016 (aged 60)
- Occupations: Historian, Biographer, Army Officer

Academic background
- Education: University College, Oxford; Trinity Hall, Cambridge; Royal Military Academy Sandhurst; King's College London
- Military career
- Allegiance: United Kingdom
- Branch: British Army
- Service years: 1978–1988
- Rank: Major
- Service number: 500813
- Unit: Royal Army Education Corps

Alexander Danchev (26 August 1955 – 7 August 2016) was a British historian, biographer, and army officer. His work ranged from military history to the lives of artists. His originality stems from a vast erudition put at the service of a cross-understanding of disparate fields such as art and war.

== Early life ==
Danchev was born in Bolton, Lancashire, in 1955 to Alfons Danchev, a Belgian-Bulgarian mining engineer, and his wife Anne (née Gilman). He studied history and economics at University College, Oxford, where he graduated in 1977. He then attended Trinity Hall, Cambridge, where he received a Postgraduate Certificate in Education. In 1978 he began teaching at the Royal Military Academy Sandhurst. In this capacity, he served as an officer in the Royal Army Education Corps for the next ten years.

In addition to his teaching activities, he studied War Studies at King's College London and received his doctorate there in 1984.

== Career ==
In 1988 he left the British Army and held a research fellowship at King's College London. He then became a Lecturer in International Relations at Keele University. He subsequently became a professor and head of department. From 2004 to 2014 he taught at the School of Politics and International Relations at the University of Nottingham. In 2014 he moved to the University of St Andrews, where he taught as Professor of International Relations until his death.

Danchev was a visiting fellow at Queen Mary, University of London and St Antony's College, Oxford.

He wrote regularly for the Times Higher Education and Times Literary Supplement, the London Review of Books and The Guardian.

== Personal life ==
Danchev was married to Dee Cooper since 1998. His wife brought two daughters into the marriage. He died of myocardial infarction in August 2016 at the age of 60.

== Selected works ==
- Oliver Franks: Founding Father, (1993, Oxford University Press, Oxford)
- Alchemist of War: The Life of Basil Liddell Hart (1998)
- War Diaries: Field Marshal Lord Alanbrooke (2001)
- Georges Braque: A Life (2005)
- On Art and War and Terror (2009)
- 100 Artists’ Manifestos (2011)
- Cézanne: A Life (2012)
- The Letters of Paul Cezanne (2013) (editor)
- On Good and Evil and the Grey Zone (2015)
- Magritte: A Life (2021)
