= Indirect approach =

Military strategy

The Indirect approach is a military strategy described and chronicled by B. H. Liddell Hart after World War I. It was an attempt to find a solution to the problem of high casualty rates in conflict zones with high force to space ratios, such as the Western Front on which he served. The strategy calls for armies to advance along the line of least resistance.

The holistic view of the "indirect approach" was first described in The Dicisive Wars of History (1929), which was the first part of the later: Strategy: The Indirect Approach. Further Liddel Hart supplemented it by a compendium flagging the British Way (1932), and added it with new cases based on the experience of the World War II in 1941, 1946, 1954, and 1967.

== Quotations ==
=== From Liddell Hart ===
"Throughout the ages, effective results in war have rarely been attained unless the approach has had such indirectness as to ensure the opponent’s unreadiness to meet it… In strategy, the longest way round is often the shortest way home.” A direct approach to the object exhausts the attacker and hardens the resistance by compression, where as an indirect approach loosens the defender's hold by upsetting his balance".

=== From Sun Tzu ===
"In all fighting, the direct method may be used for joining battle, but indirect methods will be needed in order to secure victory. In battle, there are not more than two methods of attack – the direct and the indirect; yet these two in combination give rise to an endless series of maneuvers. The direct and the indirect lead on to each other in turn. It is like moving in a circle – you never come to an end. Who can exhaust the possibilities of their combination?"

== Principles ==
There were two fundamental principles which governed the indirect approach.

- Direct attacks on firm defensive positions almost never work and should never be attempted.
- To defeat the enemy, one must first disrupt his equilibrium. This cannot be an effect of the main attack; it must take place before the main attack is commenced.

While Liddell Hart originally developed the theory for infantry, contact with J. F. C. Fuller helped change his theory more towards tanks. The indirect approach would become a major factor in the development of blitzkrieg. Often misunderstood, the indirect approach is not a treatise against fighting direct battles; it was still based on the Clausewitzian ideal of direct combat and the destruction of an enemy force by arms. It was in reality an attempt to create a doctrine for the remobilization of warfare after the costly attrition of the strategic stalemate of the First World War.
