= Frans Osinga =

Dutch historian

Frans Osinga (born 1963) is professor in War Studies at the Institute of Security and Global Affairs, Leiden University, Netherlands, since 2019.

Osinga was appointed Chair in War Studies in 2010, as well as Head of the Military Operational Art and Science Section at the Faculty of Military Sciences of the Netherlands Defence Academy. As Chair he directs the multidisciplinary research program of the War Studies Department.

== Selected publications ==
- Osinga, Frans (2007). Science, Strategy and War: The Strategic Theory of John Boyd. Routledge. ISBN 9780415459525.
- Terriff, Terry; Osinga, Frans; Farrell, Theo, eds. (2010). A Transformation Gap?: American Innovations and European Military Change. Stanford University Press. ISBN 9780804781800.
- Ducheine, Paul; Osinga, Frans; Soeters, Joseph, eds. (2012). Cyber warfare: critical perspectives. T. M. C. Asser Press. ISBN 9789067043410.
- Sweijs, Tim; van Genugten, Saskia; Osinga, Frans, eds. (2024). Defence Planning for Small and Middle Powers: Rethinking Force Development in an Age of Disruption. Routledge. ISBN 9781032503561.
