= The Family Doctor =

19th-century magazine

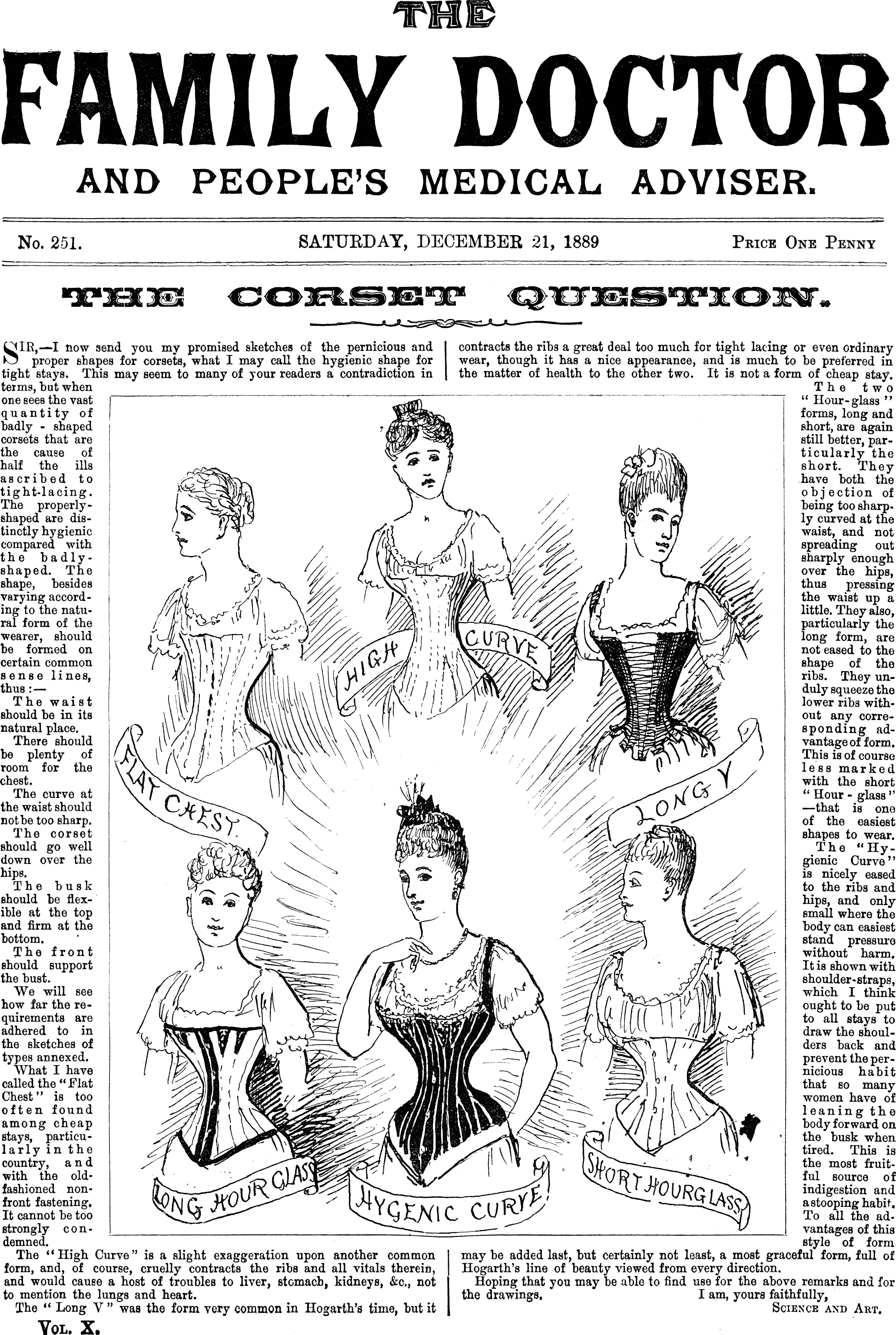
A front page of The Family Doctor from 1889

The Family Doctor and People's Medical Adviser was published on 7 March 1885 by George Purkess of 286, Strand. The magazine was headquartered in London.

The magazine is known for the readers' letters about sexual fetishism.

== Sources ==
- The Regime of the Stay-Lace, pp. 51ff. ISBN 0-9512385-3-1
- The Corset; A Cultural History, pp. 93ff. ISBN 0-300-09953-3
