= Horses in warfare =

Use of equines in combat

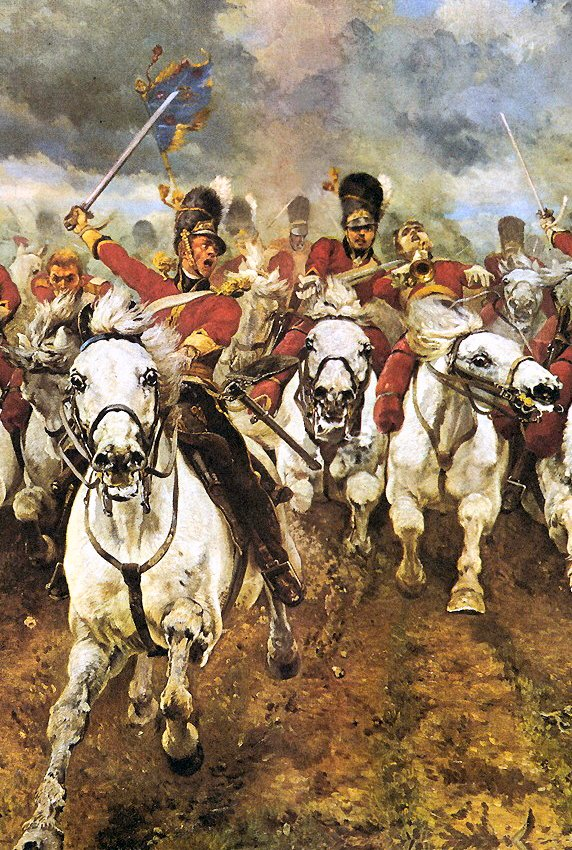
Scotland Forever! [crop] depicting the cavalry charge of the Royal Scots Greys at the Battle of Waterloo.

The first evidence of horses in warfare dates from Eurasia between 4000 and 3000 BC. A Sumerian illustration of warfare from 2500 BC depicts some type of equine pulling wagons. By 1600 BC, improved harness and chariot designs made chariot warfare common throughout the Ancient Near East, and the earliest written training manual for war horses was a guide for training chariot horses written about 1350 BC. As formal cavalry tactics replaced the chariot, so did new training methods, and by 360 BC, the Greek cavalry officer Xenophon had written an extensive treatise on horsemanship. The effectiveness of horses in battle was also revolutionized by improvements in technology, such as the invention of the saddle, the stirrup, and the horse collar.

Many different types and sizes of horses were used in war, depending on the form of warfare. The type used varied with whether the horse was being ridden or driven, and whether they were being used for reconnaissance, cavalry charges, raiding, communication, or supply. Throughout history, mules and donkeys, as well as horses played a crucial role in providing support to armies in the field.

Horses were well suited to the warfare tactics of the nomadic cultures from the steppes of Eastern Europe and Central Asia. Several cultures in East Asia made extensive use of cavalry and chariots. Muslim warriors relied upon light cavalry in their campaigns throughout Northern Africa, Asia, and Europe beginning in the 7th and 8th centuries AD. Europeans used several types of war horses in the Middle Ages, and the best-known heavy cavalry warrior of the period was the armoured knight. With the decline of the knight and rise of gunpowder in warfare, light cavalry again rose to prominence, used in both European warfare and in the conquest of the Americas. Battle cavalry developed to take on a multitude of roles in the late 18th century and early 19th century and was often crucial for victory in the Napoleonic Wars. In the Americas, the use of horses and development of mounted warfare tactics were learned by several tribes of indigenous people and in turn, highly mobile horse regiments were critical in the American Civil War.

Horse cavalry began to be phased out after World War I in favour of tank warfare, though a few horse cavalry units were still used into World War II, especially as scouts. By the end of World War II, horses were seldom seen in battle, but were still used extensively for the transport of troops and supplies. Today, formal battle-ready horse cavalry units have almost disappeared, though the United States Army Special Forces used horses in battle during the 2001 invasion of Afghanistan. Horses are still seen in use by organized armed fighters in the Global South. Many nations still maintain small units of mounted riders for patrol and reconnaissance, and military horse units are also used for ceremonial and educational purposes. Horses are also used for historical reenactment of battles, law enforcement, and in equestrian competitions derived from the riding and training skills once used by the military.

== Types of horse used in warfare ==
A fundamental principle of equine conformation is "form to function". Therefore, the type of horse used for various forms of warfare depended on the work performed, the weight a horse needed to carry or pull, and distance travelled. Weight affects speed and endurance, creating a trade-off: armour added protection, but added weight reduced maximum speed. Therefore, various cultures had different military needs. In some situations, one primary type of horse was favoured over all others. In other places, multiple types were needed; warriors would travel to battle riding a lighter horse of greater speed and endurance, and then switch to a heavier horse, with greater weight-carrying capacity, when wearing heavy armour in actual combat.

The average horse can carry up to approximately 30% of its body weight. While all horses can pull more weight than they can carry, the maximum weight that horses can pull varies widely, depending on the build of the horse, the type of vehicle, road conditions, and other factors. Horses harnessed to a wheeled vehicle on a paved road can pull as much as eight times their weight, but far less if pulling wheelless loads over unpaved terrain. Thus, horses that were driven varied in size and had to make a trade-off between speed and weight, just as did riding animals. Light horses could pull a small war chariot at speed. Heavy supply wagons, artillery, and support vehicles were pulled by heavier horses or a larger number of horses. The method by which a horse was hitched to a vehicle also mattered: horses could pull greater weight with a horse collar than they could with a breast collar, and even less with an ox yoke.

=== Light-weight ===
Light, oriental horses such as the ancestors of the modern Arabian, Barb, and Akhal-Teke were used for warfare that required speed, endurance, and agility. Such horses ranged from about 12 hands (48 inches, 122 cm) to just under 15 hands (60 inches, 152 cm), weighing approximately 360 to 450 kilograms (800 to 1,000 lb). To move quickly, riders had to use lightweight tack and carry relatively light weapons such as bows, light spears, javelins, or later rifles. This was the original horse used for early chariot warfare, raiding, and light cavalry.

Relatively light horses were used by many cultures, including the Ancient Egyptians, the Mongols, the Arabs, and the Native Americans. Throughout the Ancient Near East, small, light animals were used to pull chariots designed to carry no more than two passengers, a driver and a warrior. In the European Middle Ages, a lightweight war horse became known as the rouncey.

=== Medium-weight ===
Medium-weight horses developed as early as the Iron Age with the needs of various civilizations to pull heavier loads, such as chariots capable of holding more than two people, and, as light cavalry evolved into heavy cavalry, to carry heavily armoured riders. The Scythians were among the earliest cultures to produce taller, heavier horses. Larger horses were also needed to pull supply wagons and, later on, artillery pieces. In Europe, horses were also used to a limited extent to maneuver cannons on the battlefield as part of dedicated horse artillery units. Medium-weight horses had the greatest range in size, from about 14.2 hands (58 inches, 147 cm) but stocky, to as much as 16 hands (64 inches, 163 cm), weighing approximately 450 to 540 kilograms (1,000 to 1,200 lb). They generally were quite agile in combat, though they did not have the raw speed or endurance of a lighter horse. By the Middle Ages, larger horses in this class were sometimes called destriers. They may have resembled modern heavy warmblood breeds. (Note: The Royal Armouries used a 15.2 hand Lithuanian Heavy Draught mare as a model for statues displaying various 15th and 16th century horse armour, as her body shape was an excellent fit.) Later, horses similar to the modern warmblood often carried European cavalry.

=== Heavy-weight ===
Large, heavy horses, weighing from 680 to 910 kilograms (1,500 to 2,000 lb), the ancestors of today's draught horses, were used, particularly in Europe, from the Middle Ages onward. They pulled heavy loads like supply wagons and were disposed to remain calm in battle. Some historians believe they may have carried the heaviest-armoured knights of the Late Medieval Period, though others dispute this claim, indicating that the destrier, or knight's battle horse, was a medium-weight animal. It is also disputed whether the destrier class included draught animals or not. Breeds at the smaller end of the heavyweight category may have included the ancestors of the Percheron, agile for their size and physically able to maneuver in battle.

=== Ponies ===
The British Army's 2nd Dragoons in 1813 had 340 ponies of 14.2 hands (58 inches, 147 cm) and 55 ponies of 14 hands (56 inches, 142 cm); the Lovat Scouts, formed in 1899, were mounted on Highland ponies; the British Army recruited 200 Dales ponies in World War II for use as pack and artillery animals; and the British Territorial Army experimented with the use of Dartmoor ponies as pack animals in 1935, finding them to be better than mules for the job.

=== Other equids ===
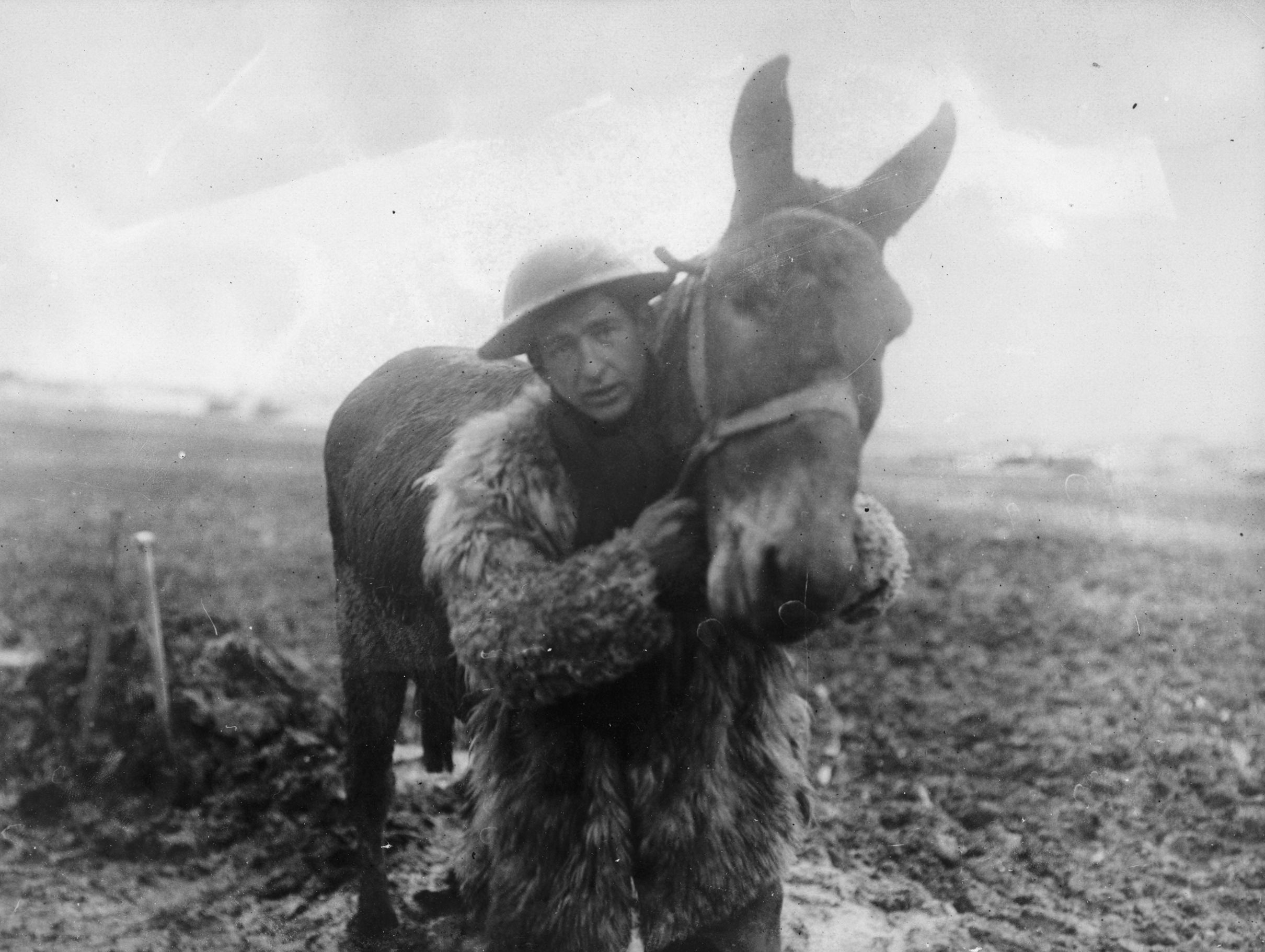
A soldier with a mule in World War I, 1918

Horses were not the only equids used to support human warfare. Donkeys have been used as pack animals from antiquity to the present. Mules were also commonly used, especially as pack animals and to pull wagons, but also occasionally for riding. Because mules are often both calmer and hardier than horses, they were particularly useful for strenuous support tasks, such as hauling supplies over difficult terrain. However, under gunfire, they were less cooperative than horses, so were generally not used to haul artillery on battlefields. The size of a mule and work to which it was put depended largely on the breeding of the mare that produced the mule. Mules could be lightweight, medium weight, or even, when produced from draught horse mares, of moderate heavy weight.

== Training and deployment ==
The oldest known manual on training horses for chariot warfare was written c. 1350 BC by the Hittite horsemaster, Kikkuli. An ancient manual on the subject of training riding horses, particularly for the Ancient Greek cavalry is Hippike (On Horsemanship) written about 360 BC by the Greek cavalry officer Xenophon. and another early text was that of Kautilya, written about 323 BC.

Whether horses were trained to pull chariots, to be ridden as light or heavy cavalry, or to carry the armoured knight, much training was required to overcome the horse's natural instinct to flee from noise, the smell of blood, and the confusion of combat. They also learned to accept any sudden or unusual movements of humans while using a weapon or avoiding one. Horses used in close combat may have been taught, or at least permitted, to kick, strike, and even bite, thus becoming weapons themselves for the warriors they carried. Equine animals also have a high tolerance for pain and will often conceal injuries to continue tasks, making them especially valuable during warfare.

In most cultures, a war horse used as a riding animal was trained to be controlled with limited use of reins, responding primarily to the rider's legs and weight. The horse became accustomed to any necessary tack and protective armour placed upon it, and learned to balance under a rider who would also be laden with weapons and armour. Developing the balance and agility of the horse was crucial. The origins of the discipline of dressage came from the need to train horses to be both obedient and manoeuvrable. The Haute ecole or "High School" movements of classical dressage taught today at the Spanish Riding School have their roots in manoeuvres designed for the battlefield. However, the airs above the ground were unlikely to have been used in actual combat, as most would have exposed the unprotected underbelly of the horse to the weapons of foot soldiers.

Horses used for chariot warfare were not only trained for combat conditions, but because many chariots were pulled by a team of two to four horses, they also had to learn to work together with other animals in close quarters under chaotic conditions.

== Technological innovations ==
Horses were probably ridden in prehistory before they were driven. However, evidence is scant, mostly simple images of human figures on horse-like animals drawn on rock or clay. The earliest tools used to control horses were bridles of various sorts, which were invented nearly as soon as the horse was domesticated. Evidence of bit wear appears on the teeth of horses excavated at the archaeology sites of the Botai culture in northern Kazakhstan, dated 3500–3000 BC.

=== Harness and vehicles ===
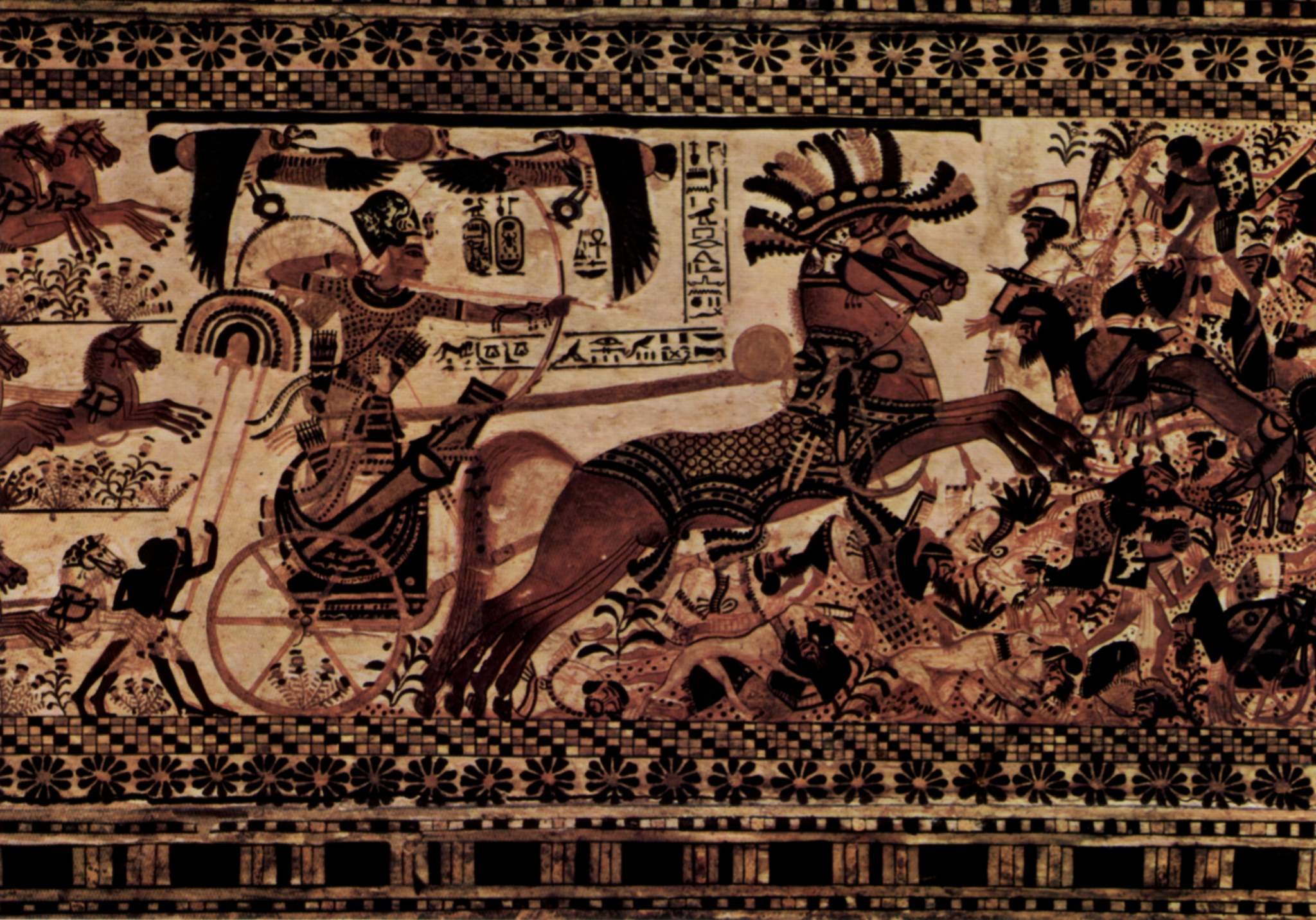
Chariots and archers were weapons of war in Ancient Egypt.

The invention of the wheel was a major technological innovation that gave rise to chariot warfare. At first, equines, both horses and onagers, were hitched to wheeled carts by means of a yoke around their necks in a manner similar to that of oxen. However, such a design is incompatible with equine anatomy, limiting both the strength and mobility of the animal. By the time of the Hyksos invasions of Egypt, c. 1600 BC, horses were pulling chariots with an improved harness design that made use of a breastcollar and breeching, which allowed a horse to move faster and pull more weight.

Even after the chariot had become obsolete as a tool of war, there still was a need for technological innovations in pulling technologies; horses were needed to pull heavy loads of supplies and weapons. The invention of the horse collar in China during the 5th century AD (Northern and Southern dynasties) allowed horses to pull greater weight than they could when hitched to a vehicle with the ox yokes or breast collars used in earlier times. The horse collar arrived in Europe during the 9th century, and became widespread by the 12th century.

=== Riding equipment ===
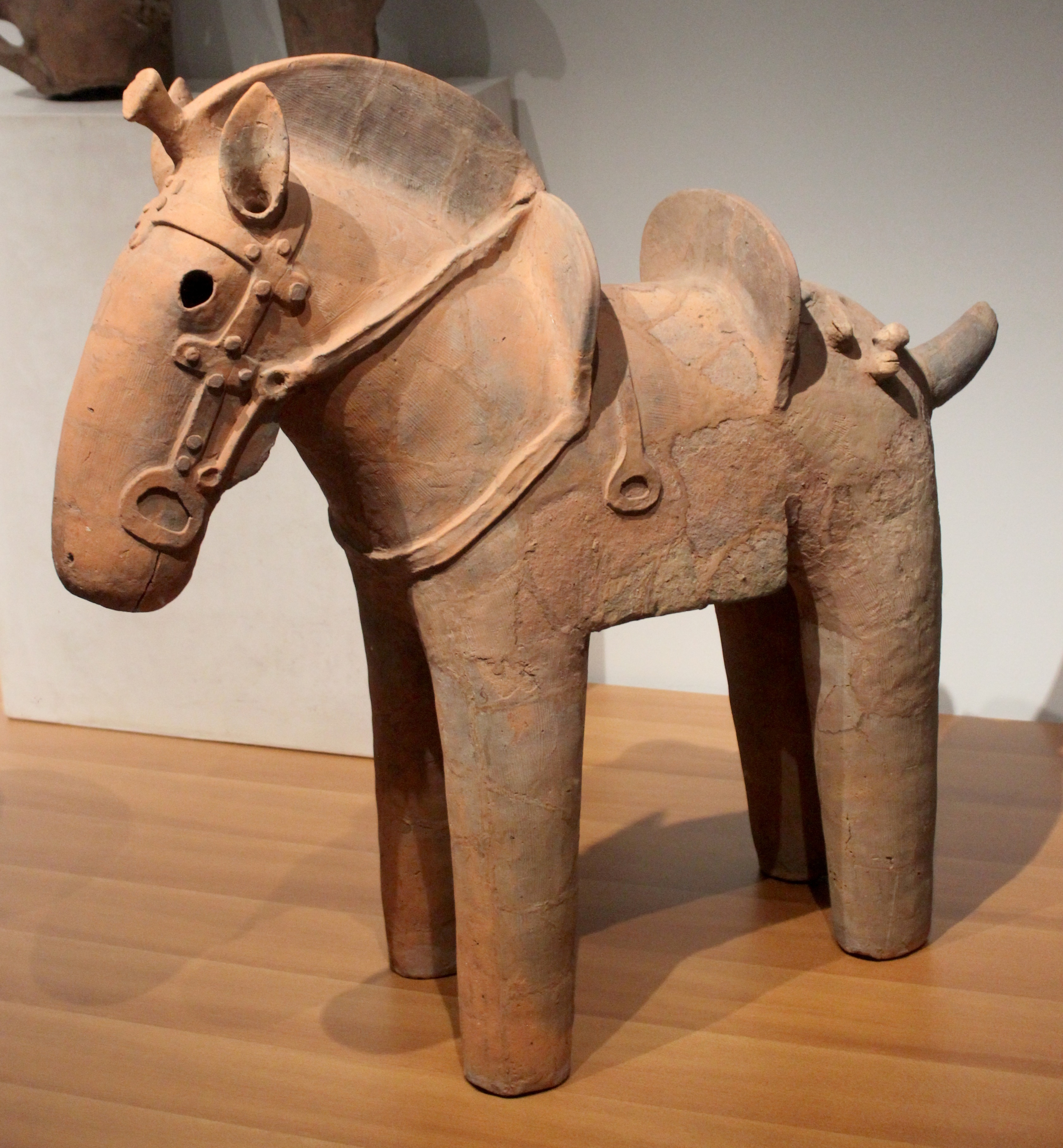
Haniwa horse statuette, complete with saddle and stirrups, 6th century, Kofun period

Two major innovations that revolutionised the effectiveness of mounted warriors in battle were the saddle and the stirrup. Riders quickly learned to pad their horse's backs to protect themselves from the horse's spine and withers, and fought on horseback for centuries with little more than a blanket or pad on the horse's back and a rudimentary bridle. To help distribute the rider's weight and protect the horse's back, some cultures created stuffed padding that resembles the panels of today's English saddle. Both the Scythians and Assyrians used pads with added felt attached with a surcingle or girth around the horse's barrel for increased security and comfort. Xenophon mentioned the use of a padded cloth on cavalry mounts as early as the 4th century BC.

The saddle with a solid framework, or "tree", provided a bearing surface to protect the horse from the weight of the rider, but was not widespread until the 2nd century AD. However, it made a critical difference, as horses could carry more weight when distributed across a solid saddle tree. A solid tree, the predecessor of today's Western saddle, also allowed a more built-up seat to give the rider greater security in the saddle. The Romans are credited with the invention of the solid-treed saddle.

An invention that made cavalry particularly effective was the stirrup. A toe loop that held the big toe was used in India possibly as early as 500 BC, and later a single stirrup was used as a mounting aid. The first set of paired stirrups appeared in China about 322 AD during the Jin dynasty. Following the invention of paired stirrups, which allowed a rider greater leverage with weapons, as well as both increased stability and mobility while mounted, nomadic groups such as the Mongols adopted this technology and developed a decisive military advantage. By the 7th century, due primarily to invaders from Central Asia, stirrup technology spread from Asia to Europe. The Avar invaders are viewed as primarily responsible for spreading the use of the stirrup into central Europe. However, while stirrups were known in Europe in the 8th century, pictorial and literary references to their use date only from the 9th century. Widespread use in Northern Europe, including England, is credited to the Vikings, who spread the stirrup in the 9th and 10th centuries to those areas.

== Tactics ==
The "War Panel" of the Standard of Ur

The first archaeological evidence of horses used in warfare dates from between 4000 and 3000 BC in the steppes of Eurasia, in what today is Ukraine, Hungary, and Romania. Not long after domestication of the horse, people in these locations began to live together in large fortified towns for protection from the threat of horseback-riding raiders, who could attack and escape faster than people of more sedentary cultures could follow. Horse-mounted nomads of the steppe and current day Eastern Europe spread Indo-European Languages as they conquered other tribes and groups.

The use of horses in organised warfare was documented early in recorded history. One of the first depictions is the "war panel" of the Standard of Ur, in Sumer, dated c. 2500 BC, showing horses (or possibly onagers or mules) pulling a four-wheeled wagon.

=== Chariot warfare ===
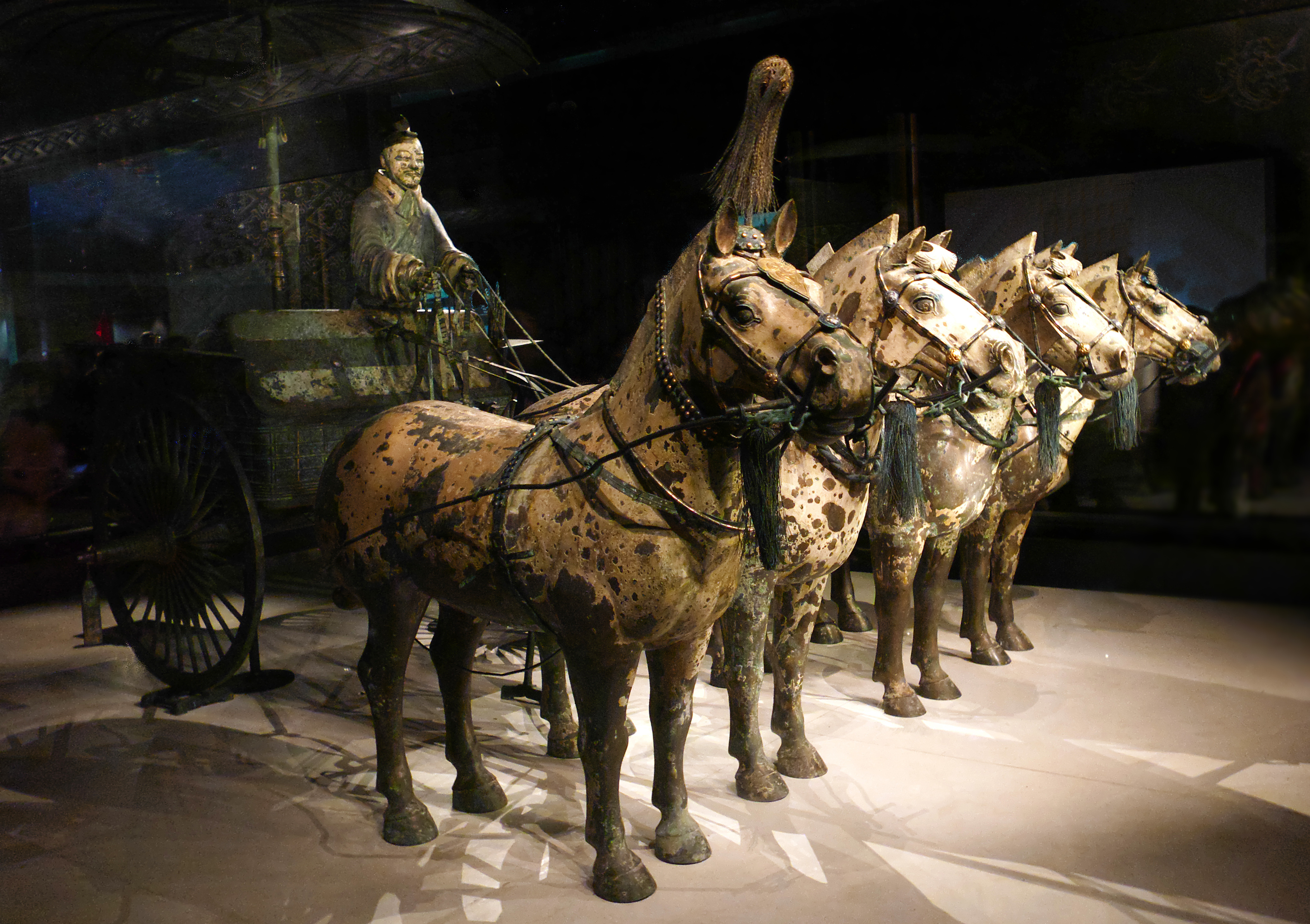
A Qin dynasty sculpture of a chariot with horses and rider from the Terracotta Army unearthed near the tomb of China's first emperor Qin Shihuangdi, Xi'an, China, 3rd century BC

Among the earliest evidence of chariot use are the burials of horse and chariot remains by the Andronovo (Sintashta-Petrovka) culture in modern Russia and Kazakhstan, dated to approximately 2000 BC. The oldest documentary evidence of what was probably chariot warfare in the Ancient Near East is the Old Hittite Anitta text, of the 18th century BC, which mentioned 40 teams of horses at the siege of Salatiwara. The Hittites became well known throughout the ancient world for their prowess with the chariot. Widespread use of the chariot in warfare across most of Eurasia coincides approximately with the development of the composite bow, known from c. 1600 BC. Further improvements in wheels and axles, as well as innovations in weaponry, soon resulted in chariots being driven in battle by Bronze Age societies from China to Egypt.

The Hyksos invaders brought the chariot to Ancient Egypt in the 16th century BC and the Egyptians adopted its use from that time forward. The oldest preserved text related to the handling of war horses in the ancient world is the Hittite manual of Kikkuli, which dates to about 1350 BC, and describes the conditioning of chariot horses.

Chariots existed in the Minoan civilization, as they were inventoried on storage lists from Knossos in Crete, dating to around 1450 BC. Chariots were also used in China as far back as the Shang dynasty (c. 1600–1050 BC), where they appear in burials. The high point of chariot use in China was in the Spring and Autumn period (770–476 BC), although they continued in use up until the 2nd century BC.

Descriptions of the tactical role of chariots in Ancient Greece and Rome are rare. The Iliad, possibly referring to Mycenaen practices used c. 1250 BC, describes the use of chariots for transporting warriors to and from battle, rather than for actual fighting. Later, Julius Caesar, invading Britain in 55 and 54 BC, noted British charioteers throwing javelins, then leaving their chariots to fight on foot.

=== Cavalry ===
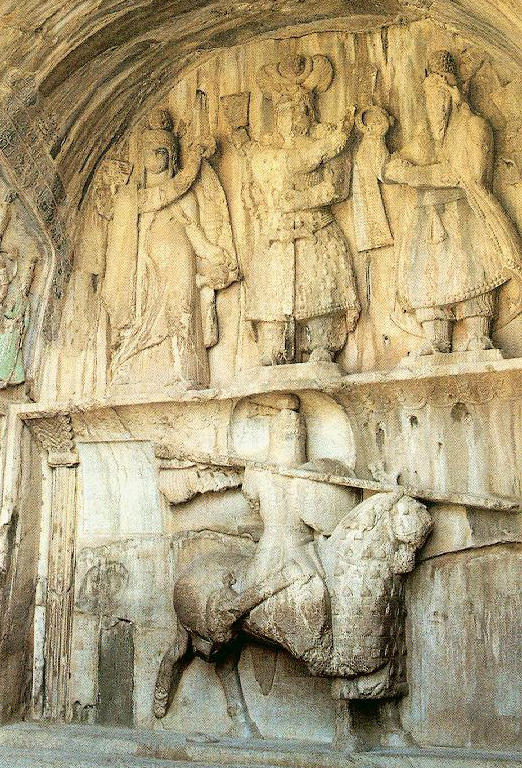
Depiction of a Sasanian Persian Cataphract from Taq-e Bostan

Some of the earliest examples of horses being ridden in warfare were horse-mounted archers or javelin-throwers, dating to the reigns of the Assyrian rulers Ashurnasirpal II and Shalmaneser III. However, these riders sat far back on their horses, a precarious position for moving quickly, and the horses were held by a handler on the ground, keeping the archer free to use the bow. Thus, these archers were more a type of mounted infantry than true cavalry. The Assyrians developed cavalry in response to invasions by nomadic people from the north, such as the Cimmerians, who entered Asia Minor in the 8th century BC and took over parts of Urartu during the reign of Sargon II, approximately 721 BC. Mounted warriors such as the Scythians also had an influence on the region in the 7th century BC. By the reign of Ashurbanipal in 669 BC, the Assyrians had learned to sit forward on their horses in the classic riding position still seen today and could be said to be true light cavalry. The ancient Greeks used both light horse scouts and heavy cavalry, although not extensively, possibly due to the cost of keeping horses.

Heavy cavalry was believed to have been developed by the Ancient Persians, although others argue for the Sarmatians. By the time of Darius (558–486 BC), Persian military tactics required horses and riders that were completely armoured, and selectively bred a heavier, more muscled horse to carry the additional weight. The cataphract was a type of heavily armoured cavalry with distinct tactics, armour, and weaponry used from the time of the Persians up until the Middle Ages. The most prized horse breed at the time were the Nisean horses.

In Ancient Greece, Phillip of Macedon is credited with developing tactics allowing massed cavalry charges. The most famous Greek heavy cavalry units were the companion cavalry of Alexander the Great. The Chinese of the 4th century BC during the Warring States period (403–221 BC) began to use cavalry against rival states. To fight nomadic raiders from the north and west, the Chinese of the Han dynasty (202 BC – 220 AD) developed effective mounted units. Cavalry was not used extensively by the Romans during the Roman Republic period, but by the time of the Roman Empire, they made use of heavy cavalry. However, the backbone of the Roman army was the infantry.

=== Horse artillery ===
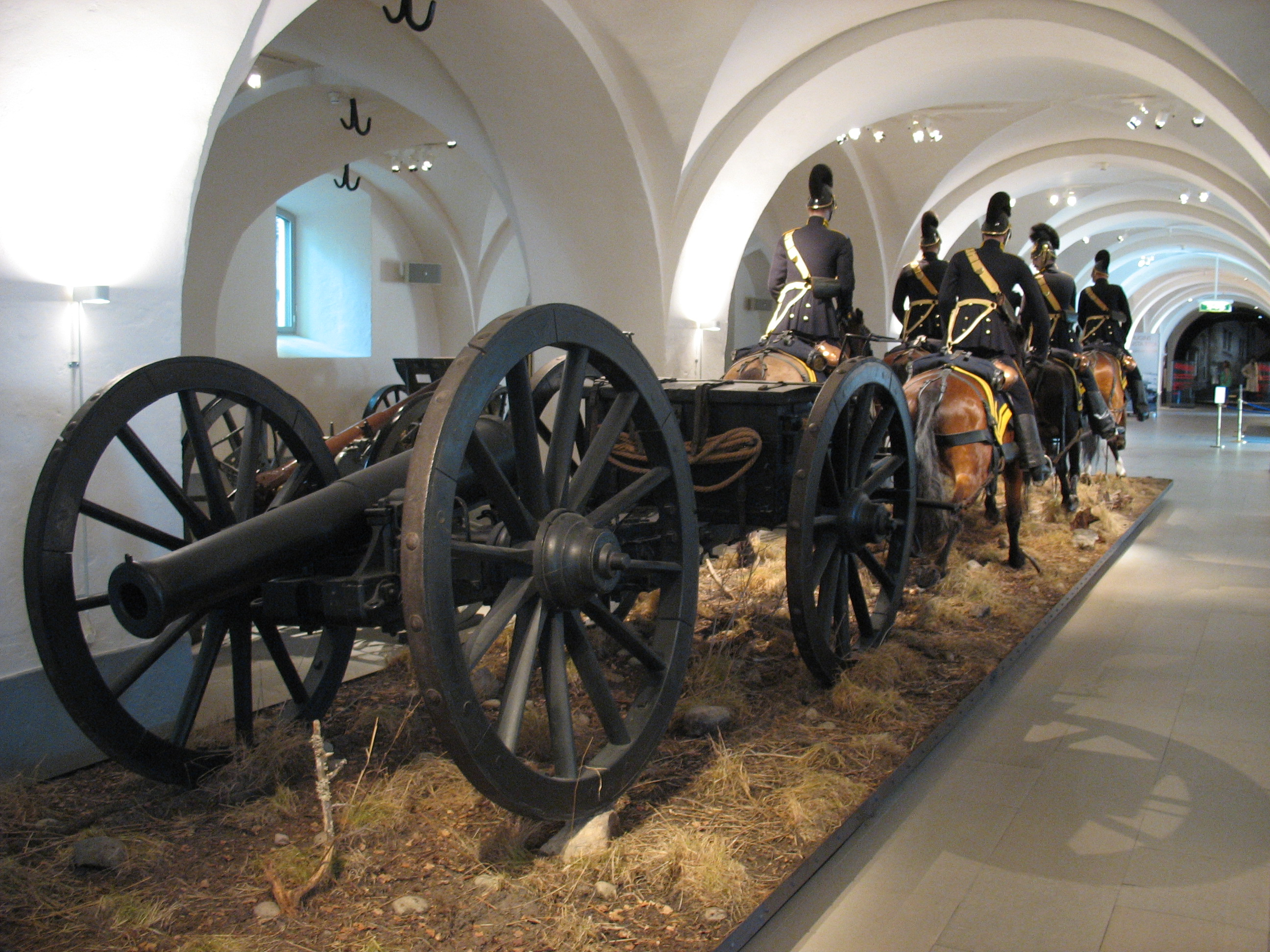
Life-size model depicting c. 1850 horse artillery team with a light artillery piece in the Swedish Army Museum in Stockholm

Once gunpowder was invented, another major use of horses was as draught animals for heavy artillery, or cannon. In addition to field artillery, where horse-drawn guns were attended by gunners on foot, many armies had artillery batteries where each gunner was provided with a mount. Horse artillery units generally used lighter pieces, pulled by six horses. "9-pounders" were pulled by eight horses, and heavier artillery pieces needed a team of twelve. With the individual riding horses required for officers, surgeons and other support staff, as well as those pulling the artillery guns and supply wagons, an artillery battery of six guns could require 160 to 200 horses. Horse artillery usually came under the command of cavalry divisions, but in some battles, such as Waterloo, the horse artillery were used as a rapid response force, repulsing attacks and assisting the infantry. Agility was important; the ideal artillery horse was 1.5 to 1.6 metres (15 to 16 hands) high, strongly built, but able to move quickly.

== Asia ==
=== Central Asia ===
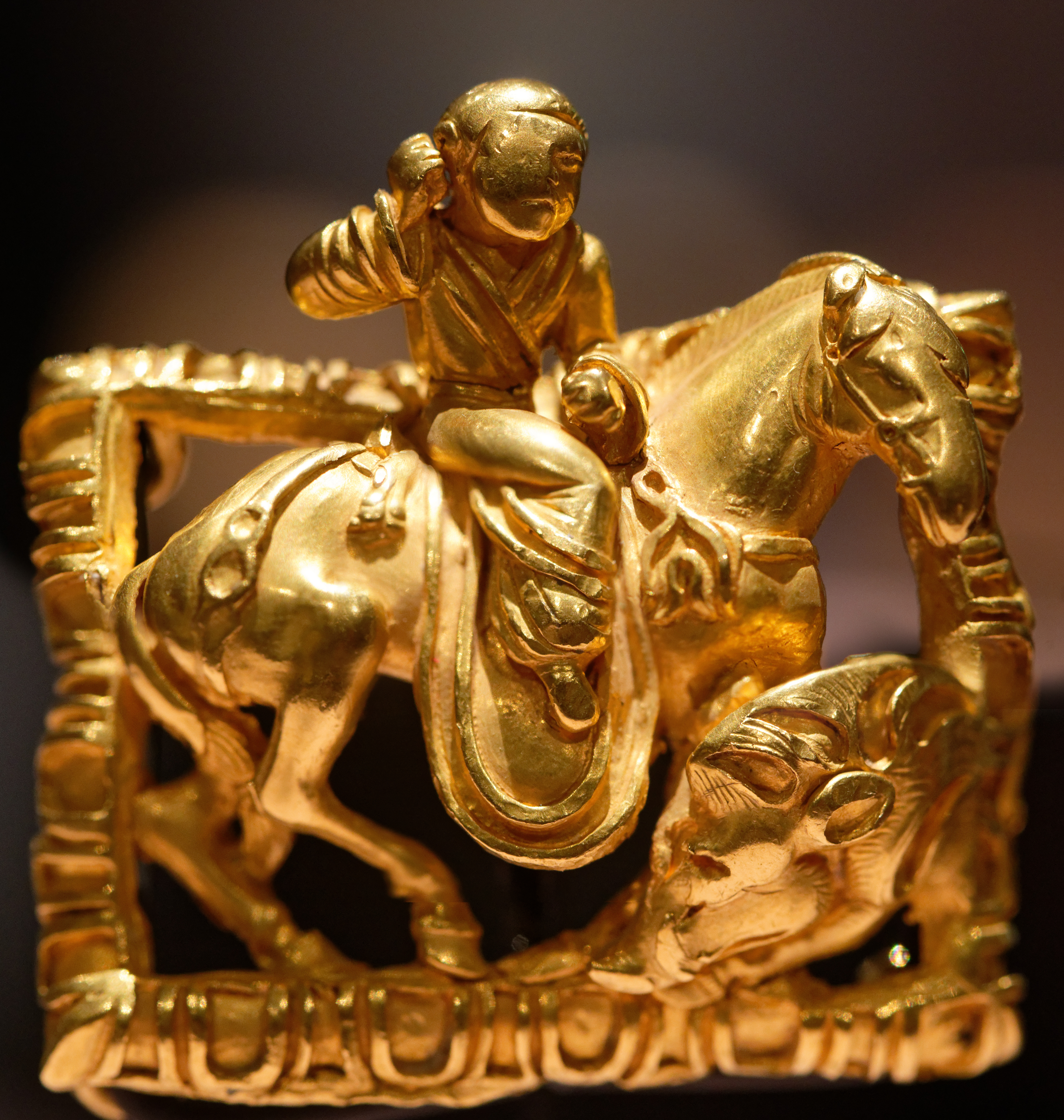
A horserider of probable Xiongnu origin: the rider wears a hairbun characteristic of the oriental steppes, and his horse has characteristically Xiongnu horse trappings. 2nd–1st century BC. Excavated in Saksanokhur (near Farkhor), Tajikistan. National Museum of Antiquities of Tajikistan.

Relations between steppe nomads and the settled people in and around Central Asia were often marked by conflict. The nomadic lifestyle was well suited to warfare, and steppe cavalry became some of the most militarily potent forces in the world, only limited by nomads' frequent lack of internal unity. Periodically, strong leaders would organise several tribes into one force, creating an almost unstoppable power. These unified groups included the Huns, who invaded Europe, and under Attila, conducted campaigns in both eastern France and northern Italy, over 500 miles apart, within two successive campaign seasons. Other unified nomadic forces included the Wu Hu rebellions in China, and the Mongol conquest of much of Eurasia.

=== South Asia ===
The literature of ancient India describes numerous horse nomads. Some of the earliest references to the use of horses in South Asian warfare are Puranic texts, which refer to an attempted invasion of India by the joint cavalry forces of the Sakas, Kambojas, Yavanas, Pahlavas, and Paradas, called the "five hordes" (pañca.ganah) or "Kśatriya" hordes (Kśatriya ganah). About 1600 BC, they captured the throne of Ayodhya by dethroning the Vedic king, Bahu. Later texts, such as the Mahābhārata, c. 950 BC, appear to recognise efforts taken to breed war horses and develop trained mounted warriors, stating that the horses of the Sindhu and Kamboja regions were of the finest quality, and the Kambojas, Gandharas, and Yavanas were expert in fighting from horses.

In technological innovation, the early toe loop stirrup is credited to the cultures of India, and may have been in use as early as 500 BC. Not long after, the cultures of Mesopotamia and Ancient Greece clashed with those of central Asia and India. Herodotus (484–425 BC) wrote that Gandarian mercenaries of the Achaemenid Empire were recruited into the army of emperor Xerxes I of Persia (486–465 BC), which he led against the Greeks. A century later, the "Men of the Mountain Land," from north of Kabul River, (Note: Possibly the Kamboja cavalry, from south of the Hindu Kush near medieval Kohistan) served in the army of Darius III of Persia when he fought against Alexander the Great at Arbela in 331 BC. In battle against Alexander at Massaga in 326 BC, the Assakenoi forces included 20,000 cavalry. The Mudra-Rakshasa recounted how cavalry of the Shakas, Yavanas, Kambojas, Kiratas, Parasikas, and Bahlikas helped Chandragupta Maurya (c. 320–298 BC) defeat the ruler of Magadha and take the throne, thus laying the foundations of Mauryan dynasty in Northern India.

Mughal cavalry used gunpowder weapons, but were slow to replace the traditional composite bow. Under the impact of European military successes in India, some Indian rulers adopted the European system of massed cavalry charges, although others did not. By the 18th century, Indian armies continued to field cavalry, but mainly of the heavy variety.

=== East Asia ===
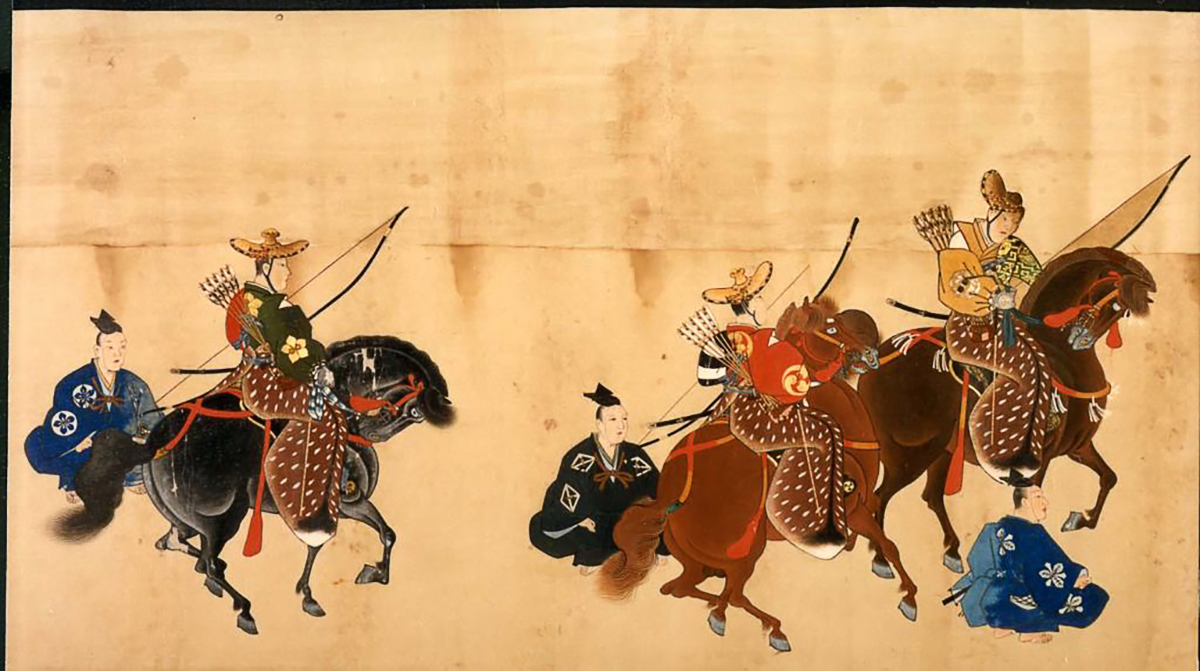
Yabusame archers, Edo period

The Chinese used chariots for horse-based warfare until light cavalry forces became common during the Warring States era (402–221 BC). A major proponent of the change to riding horses from chariots was Wu Ling, c. 320 BC. However, conservative forces in China often opposed change, as cavalry did not benefit from the additional cachet attached to being the military branch dominated by the nobility as in medieval Europe. Nevertheless, during the reign of Emperor Wu of Han (r. 141–87 BC), it is recorded that 300,000 government-owned horses were insufficient for the cavalry and baggage trains of the Han military in the campaigns to expel the Xiongnu nomads from the Ordos Desert, Qilian Mountains, Khangai Mountains and Gobi Desert, spurring new policies that encouraged households to hand over privately bred horses in exchange for military and corvee labor exemptions.

The Japanese samurai fought as cavalry for many centuries. They were particularly skilled in the art of using archery from horseback. The archery skills of mounted samurai were developed by training such as Yabusame, which originated in 530 AD and reached its peak under Minamoto no Yoritomo (1147–1199 AD) in the Kamakura period. They switched from an emphasis on mounted bowmen to mounted spearmen during the Sengoku period (1467–1615 AD).

=== West Asia ===
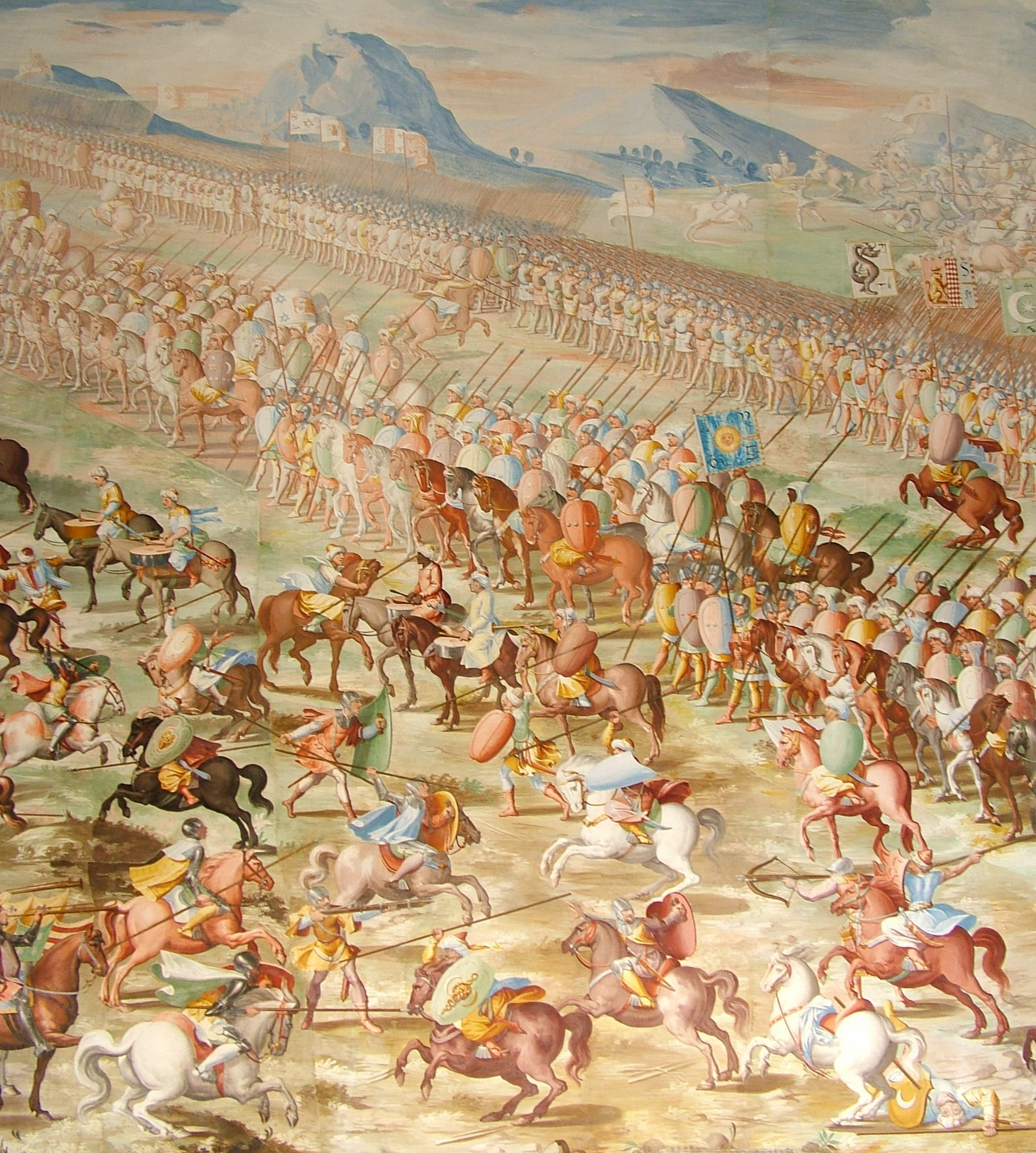
Spanish and Moorish light cavalry (jinetes) skirmish at the 1431 Battle of La Higueruela

During the period when various Islamic empires controlled much of the Middle East as well as parts of West Africa and the Iberian peninsula, Muslim armies consisted mostly of cavalry, made up of fighters from various local groups, mercenaries and Turkoman tribesmen. The latter were considered particularly skilled as both lancers and archers from horseback. In the 9th century the use of Mamluks, slaves raised to be soldiers for various Muslim rulers, became increasingly common. Mobile tactics, advanced breeding of horses, and detailed training manuals made Mamluk cavalry a highly efficient fighting force. The use of armies consisting mostly of cavalry continued among the Turkish people who founded the Ottoman Empire. Their need for large mounted forces led to an establishment of the sipahi, cavalry soldiers who were granted lands in exchange for providing military service in times of war.

Mounted Muslim warriors conquered North Africa and the Iberian Peninsula during the 7th and 8th centuries AD following the Hijrah, of Muhammad in 622 AD. By 630 AD, their influence expanded across the Middle East and into western North Africa. By 711 AD, the light cavalry of Muslim warriors had reached Spain, and controlled most of the Iberian peninsula by 720. Their mounts were of various oriental types, including the North African Barb. A few Arabian horses may have come with the Umayyads who settled in the Guadalquivir valley. Another strain of horse that came with Islamic invaders was the Turkoman horse. Muslim invaders travelled north from present-day Spain into France, where they were defeated by the Frankish ruler Charles Martel at the Battle of Tours in 732 AD.

== Europe ==
=== Middle Ages ===
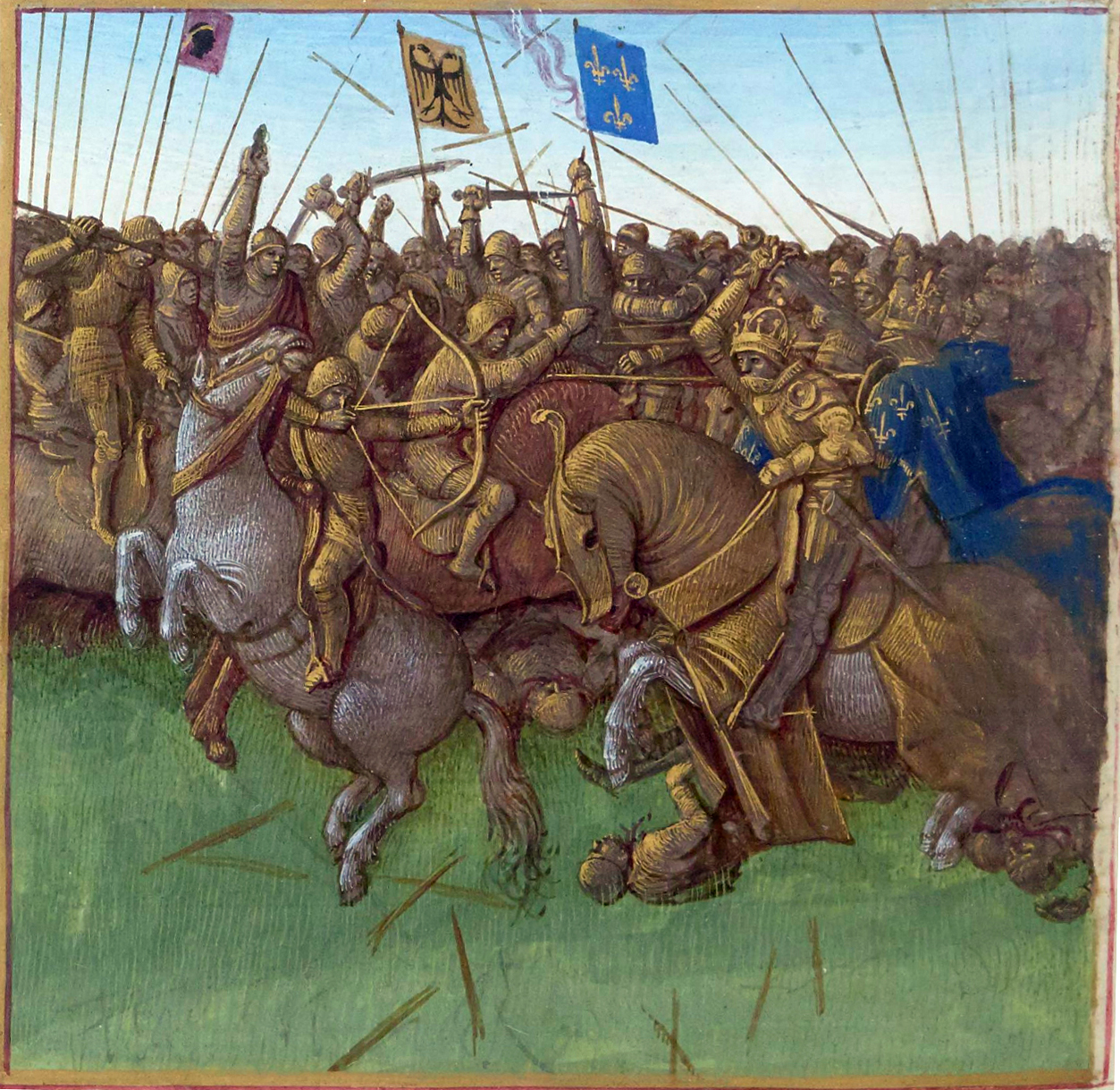
A re-imagination of Louis III and Carloman's 879 victory over the Vikings; Jean Fouquet, Grandes Chroniques de France

During the European Middle Ages, there were three primary types of war horses: the destrier, the courser, and the rouncey, which differed in size and usage. A generic word used to describe medieval war horses was charger, which appears interchangeable with the other terms. The medieval war horse was of moderate size, rarely exceeding 15.2 hands (62 inches, 157 cm). Heavy horses were logistically difficult to maintain and less adaptable to varied terrains. The destrier of the early Middle Ages was moderately larger than the courser or rouncey, in part to accommodate heavier armoured knights. However, destriers were not as large as draught horses, averaging between 14.2 hands (58 inches, 147 cm) and 15 hands (60 inches, 152 cm). On the European continent, the need to carry more armour against mounted enemies such as the Lombards and Frisians led to the Franks developing heavier, bigger horses. As the amount of armour and equipment increased in the later Middle Ages, the height of the horses increased; some late medieval horse skeletons were of horses over 1.5 metres (15 hands).

Stallions were often used as destriers due to their natural aggression. However, there may have been some use of mares by European warriors, and mares, who were quieter and less likely to call out and betray their position to the enemy, were the preferred war horse of the Moors, who invaded various parts of Southern Europe from 700 AD through the 15th century. Geldings were used in war by the Teutonic Knights, and known as "monk horses" (German: Mönchpferde or Mönchhengste). One advantage was if captured by the enemy, they could not be used to improve local bloodstock, thus maintaining the Knights' superiority in horseflesh.

==== Uses ====
The heavy cavalry charge, while it could be effective, was not a common occurrence. Battles were rarely fought on land suitable for heavy cavalry. While mounted riders remained effective for initial attacks, by the end of the 14th century, it was common for knights to dismount to fight, while their horses were sent to the rear, kept ready for pursuit. Pitched battles were avoided if possible, with most offensive warfare in the early Middle Ages taking the form of sieges, and in the later Middle Ages as mounted raids called chevauchées, with lightly armed warriors on swift horses. (Note: Chevauchées were the preferred form of warfare for the English during the Hundred Years' War and the Scots in the Wars of Independence.)

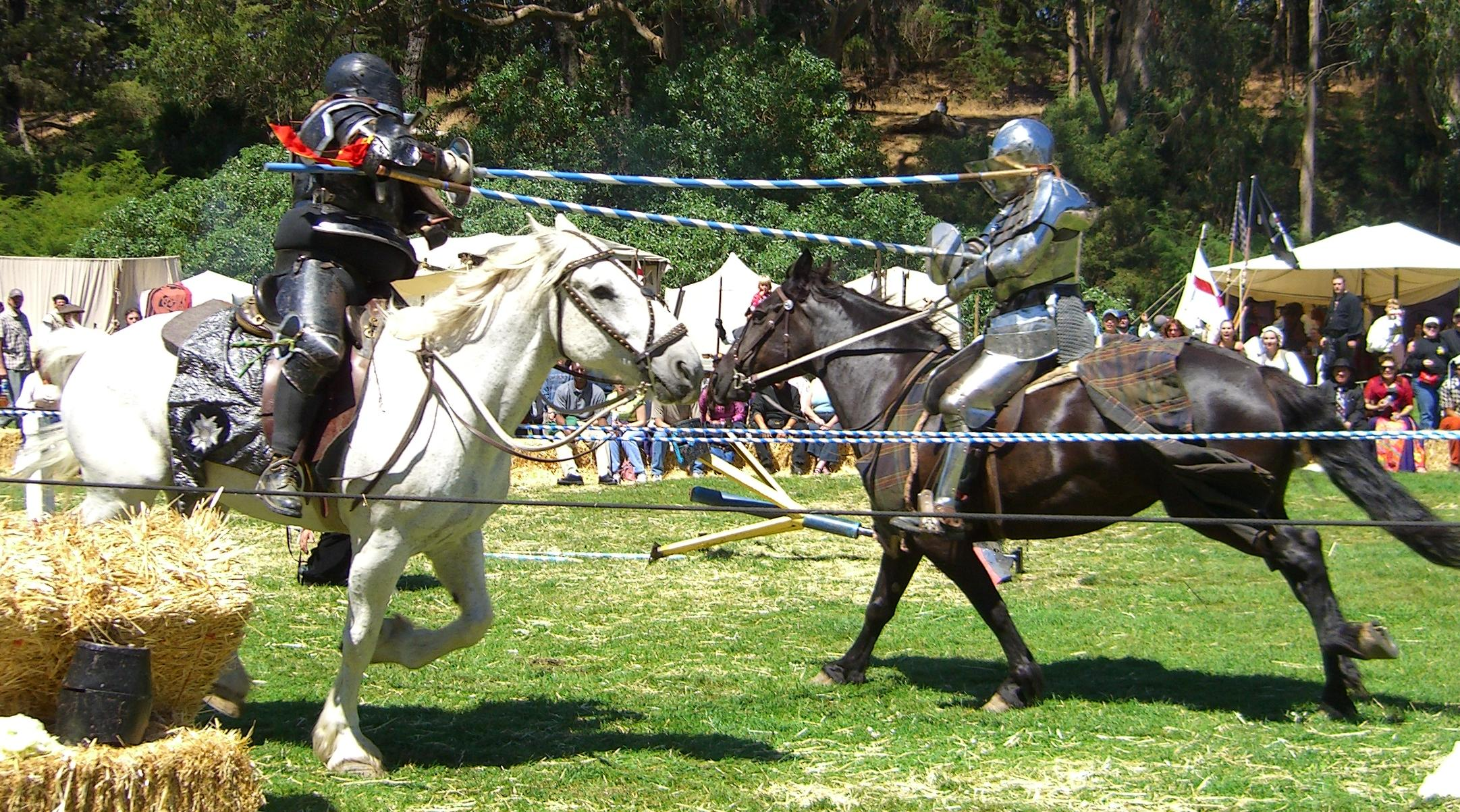
Jousting is a sport that evolved out of heavy cavalry practice.

The war horse was also seen in hastiludes – martial war games such as the joust, which began in the 11th century both as sport and to provide training for battle. Specialised destriers were bred for the purpose, although the expense of keeping, training, and outfitting them kept the majority of the population from owning one. While some historians suggest that the tournament had become a theatrical event by the 15th and 16th centuries, others argue that jousting continued to help cavalry train for battle until the Thirty Years' War.

==== Transition ====
The decline of the armoured knight was probably linked to changing structures of armies and various economic factors, and not obsolescence due to new technologies. However, some historians attribute the demise of the knight to the invention of gunpowder, or to the English longbow. Some link the decline to both technologies. Others argue these technologies actually contributed to the development of knights: plate armour was first developed to resist early medieval crossbow bolts, and the full harness worn by the early 15th century developed to resist longbow arrows. From the 14th century onwards, most plate was made from hardened steel, which resisted early musket ammunition. In addition, stronger designs did not make plate heavier; a full harness of musket-proof plate from the 17th century weighed 70 pounds (32 kg), significantly less than 16th century tournament armour.

The move to predominately infantry-based battles from 1300 to 1550 was linked to both improved infantry tactics and changes in weaponry. By the 16th century, the concept of a combined-arms professional army had spread throughout Europe. Professional armies emphasized training, and were paid via contracts, a change from the ransom and pillaging which reimbursed knights in the past. When coupled with the rising costs involved in outfitting and maintaining armour and horses, the traditional knightly classes began to abandon their profession. Light horses, or prickers, were still used for scouting and reconnaissance; they also provided a defensive screen for marching armies. Large teams of draught horses or oxen pulled the heavy early cannon. Other horses pulled wagons and carried supplies for the armies.

=== Early modern period ===
During the early modern period the shift continued from heavy cavalry and the armoured knight to unarmoured light cavalry, including Hussars and Chasseurs à cheval. Light cavalry facilitated better communication, using fast, agile horses to move quickly across battlefields. The ratio of footmen to horsemen also increased over the period as infantry weapons improved and footmen became more mobile and versatile, particularly once the musket bayonet replaced the more cumbersome pike. During the Elizabethan era, mounted units included cuirassiers, heavily armoured and equipped with lances; light cavalry, who wore mail and bore light lances and pistols; and "petronels", who carried an early carbine. As heavy cavalry use declined armour was increasingly abandoned and dragoons, whose horses were rarely used in combat, became more common: mounted infantry provided reconnaissance, escort and security. However, many generals still used the heavy mounted charge, from the late 17th century and early 18th century, where sword-wielding wedge-formation shock troops penetrated enemy lines, to the early 19th century, where armoured heavy cuirassiers were employed.

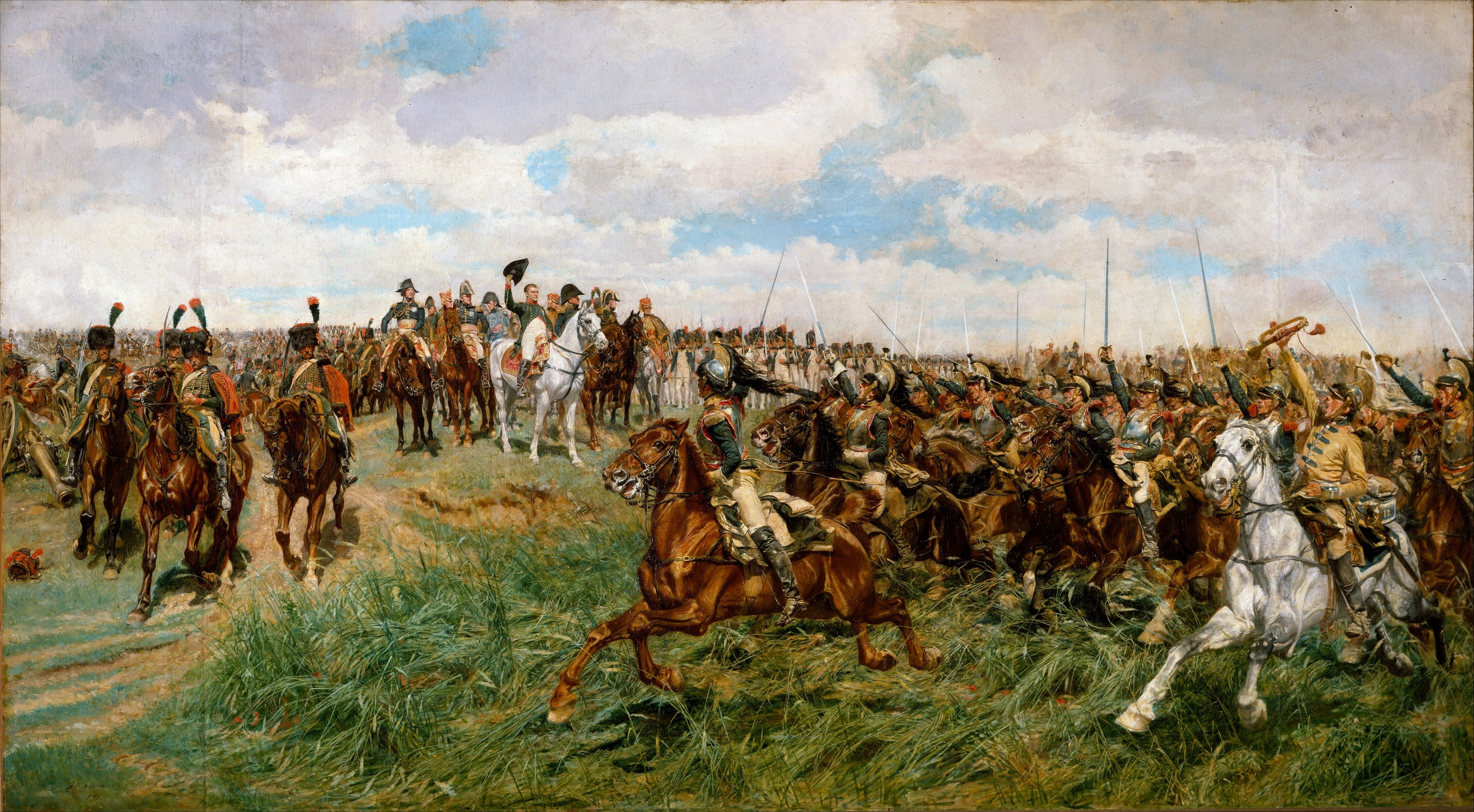
Chasseurs of the Guard (light cavalry) to the left and cuirassier (Heavy cavalry) to the right, at the battle of Friedland.

Light cavalry continued to play a major role, particularly after the Seven Years' War when Hussars started to play a larger part in battles. Though some leaders preferred tall horses for their mounted troops this was as much for prestige as for increased shock ability and many troops used more typical horses, averaging 15 hands. Cavalry tactics altered with fewer mounted charges, more reliance on drilled maneuvers at the trot, and use of firearms once within range. Ever-more elaborate movements, such as wheeling and caracole, were developed to facilitate the use of firearms from horseback. These tactics were not greatly successful in battle since pikemen protected by musketeers could deny cavalry room to manoeuvre. However the advanced equestrianism required survives into the modern world as dressage. While restricted, cavalry was not rendered obsolete. As infantry formations developed in tactics and skills, artillery became essential to break formations; in turn, cavalry was required to both combat enemy artillery, which was susceptible to cavalry while deploying, and to charge enemy infantry formations broken by artillery fire. Thus, successful warfare depended in a balance of the three arms: cavalry, artillery and infantry.

As regimental structures developed many units selected horses of uniform type and some, such as the Royal Scots Greys, even specified colour. Trumpeters often rode distinctive horses so they stood out. Regional armies developed type preferences, such as British hunters, Hanoverians in central Europe, and steppe ponies of the Cossacks, but once in the field, the lack of supplies typical of wartime meant that horses of all types were used. Since horses were such a vital component of most armies in early modern Europe, many instituted state stud farms to breed horses for the military. However, in wartime, supply rarely matched the demand, resulting in some cavalry troops fighting on foot.

=== 19th century ===
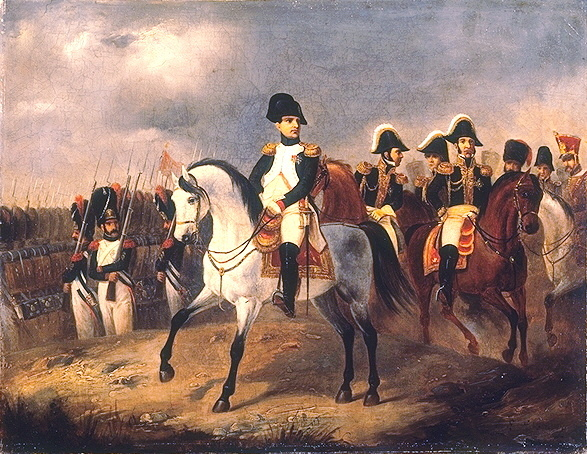
"Napoleon I with his Generals" by Ludwig Elsholtz. This painting shows light cavalry horses which come into use as officer's mounts in 18th- and 19th-century Europe.

In the 19th century distinctions between heavy and light cavalry became less significant. By the end of the Peninsular War, heavy cavalry were performing the scouting and outpost duties previously undertaken by light cavalry, and by the end of the 19th century the roles had effectively merged. Most armies at the time preferred cavalry horses to stand 15.2 hands (62 inches, 157 cm) and weigh 990 to 1,100 pounds (450 to 500 kg), although cuirassiers frequently had heavier horses. Lighter horses were used for scouting and raiding. Cavalry horses were generally obtained at 5 years of age and were in service from 10 to 12 years, barring loss. However losses of 30–40% were common during a campaign due to conditions of the march as well as enemy action. Mares and geldings were preferred over less-easily managed stallions.

During the French Revolutionary Wars and the Napoleonic Wars the cavalry's main offensive role was as shock troops. In defence cavalry were used to attack and harass the enemy's infantry flanks as they advanced. Cavalry were frequently used prior to an infantry assault, to force an infantry line to break and reform into formations vulnerable to infantry or artillery. Infantry frequently followed behind in order to secure any ground won or the cavalry could be used to break up enemy lines following a successful infantry action.

Mounted charges were carefully managed. A charge's maximum speed was 20 km/h; moving faster resulted in a break in formation and fatigued horses. Charges occurred across clear rising ground, and were effective against infantry both on the march and when deployed in a line or column. A foot battalion formed in line was vulnerable to cavalry, and could be broken or destroyed by a well-formed charge. Traditional cavalry functions altered by the end of the 19th century. Many cavalry units transferred in title and role to "mounted rifles": troops trained to fight on foot, but retaining mounts for rapid deployment, as well as for patrols, scouting, communications, and defensive screening. These troops differed from mounted infantry, who used horses for transport but did not perform the old cavalry roles of reconnaissance and support.

== Sub-Saharan Africa ==
Armoured cavalry of the Wadai Sultanate in present-day Chad. Le Petit Journal, 1911.

Horses were used for warfare in the central Sudan since the 9th century, where they were considered "the most precious commodity following the slave." The first conclusive evidence of horses playing a major role in the warfare of West Africa dates to the 11th century when the region was controlled by the Almoravids, a Muslim Berber dynasty. During the 13th and 14th centuries, cavalry became an important factor in the area. This coincided with the introduction of larger breeds of horse and the widespread adoption of saddles and stirrups. Increased mobility played a part in the formation of new power centers, such as the Oyo Empire in what today is Nigeria. The authority of many African Islamic states such as the Bornu Empire also rested in large part on their ability to subject neighboring peoples with cavalry. Despite harsh climate conditions, endemic diseases such as trypanosomiasis, the African horse sickness, and unsuitable terrain that limited the effectiveness of horses in many parts of Africa, horses were continuously imported and were, in some areas, a vital instrument of war. The introduction of horses also intensified existing conflicts, such as those between the Herero and Nama people in Namibia during the 19th century.

The African slave trade was closely tied to the imports of war horses, and as the prevalence of slaving decreased, fewer horses were needed for raiding. This significantly decreased the amount of mounted warfare seen in West Africa. By the time of the Scramble for Africa and the introduction of modern firearms in the 1880s, the use of horses in African warfare had lost most of its effectiveness. Nonetheless, in South Africa during the Second Boer War (1899–1902), cavalry and other mounted troops were the major combat force for the British, since the horse-mounted Boers moved too quickly for infantry to engage. The Boers presented a mobile and innovative approach to warfare, drawing on strategies that had first appeared in the American Civil War. The terrain was not well-suited to the British horses, resulting in the loss of over 300,000 animals. As the campaign wore on, losses were replaced by more durable African Basuto ponies, and Waler horses from Australia.

=== Ethiopia ===
A cavalry parade for king Sahle Selassie of Shewa, central Ethiopia. William Cornwallis Harris, 1845.

Equestrian culture in Ethiopia is one of the oldest in the continent of Africa. Horses were likely introduced to the Ethiopian Highlands from the Nile valley during the second half of the 2nd millennium BC. At some point people learned to breed donkey, introduced from the Arabian Peninsula, and horse to produce mules (which would become a common mode of transport for in mountainous areas). Equestrians and horse warriors in Ethiopia were called Feresenya (Amharic: ፈረስኛ), equivalent to the Arabic furusiyya, which was also the version of knight in Senterej. The first named horse in the region's history was that of Amda Seyon I in his royal chronicle "The Glorious Victories." This would set the groundwork for the Horse name in Pre-Modern Ethiopia, and the majority of horses were named for their coats or temperament. The Oromo, however, initially had no horses and would acquire them well into their expansion from Somalis. Later descriptions of Ethiopia state "The kings and nobilities of the country were reported to have strong and beautiful horses which were used not only to travel from one area to another but also for warfare purposes during territorial expansion and the fight against rebels and for hunting activities" (Pankhrust, 1989, pp. 197–199). In relation to the utilization of horses by (earlier) Ethiopians, Augustus Blandy Wylde asserts that "the war horses used by the upper classes are consistently well kept and some of them are very fine animals." Ethiopian horses are also usually seen with unique tacks of leather and wool similar to those of the Sahel and Arabia with metal disk ornaments decorating the forehead, breast collar, and running along the croup. Traditional saddles are colorful with depictions of Lions on the blankets. Historically, single-toe stirrups similar to those found in India were used. Horses are commonplace in Ethiopian Orthodox holiday celebrations and the Awi people are known for having hosted a horse festival in Gojjam since the 1940s. Likewise, depictions of horses in Ethiopian art are very common, particularly that of Saint George.

The Ethiopian riding style involves a unique approach characterized by single rein control, often without a bit, and mounting from the right side (unlike most others). Traditionally, warriors in Northeast Africa wore circular shields strapped to their forearm with weapons carried on their right side and wielded in their dominant hand. This left their shield hand, and only their shield hand, to steer the horse. Rugged terrain and varying altitudes required riders to be fit and adaptable, and don't follow the same signals as their European trained counterparts.

== The Americas ==
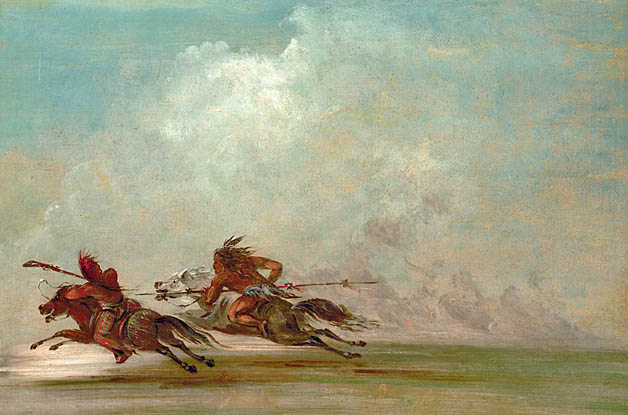
Native Americans quickly adopted the horse and were highly effective light cavalry. Comanche-Osage fight. George Catlin, 1834

The horse had been extinct in the Western Hemisphere for approximately 10,000 years prior to the arrival of Spanish Conquistadors in the early 16th century. Consequently, the Indigenous peoples of the Americas had no warfare technologies that could overcome the considerable advantage provided by European horses and gunpowder weapons. In particular this resulted in the conquest of the Aztec and Inca empires. The speed and increased impact of cavalry contributed to a number of early victories by European fighters in open terrain, though their success was limited in more mountainous regions. The Incas' well-maintained roads in the Andes enabled quick mounted raids, such as those undertaken by the Spanish while resisting the siege of Cuzco in 1536–37.

Indigenous populations of South America soon learned to use horses. In Chile, the Mapuche began using cavalry in the Arauco War in 1586. They drove the Spanish out of Araucanía at the beginning of the 17th century. Later, the Mapuche conducted mounted raids known as Malónes, first on Spanish, then on Chilean and Argentine settlements until well into the 19th century. In North America, Native Americans also quickly learned to use horses. In particular, the people of the Great Plains, such as the Comanche and the Cheyenne, became renowned horseback fighters. By the 19th century, they presented a formidable force against the United States Army.

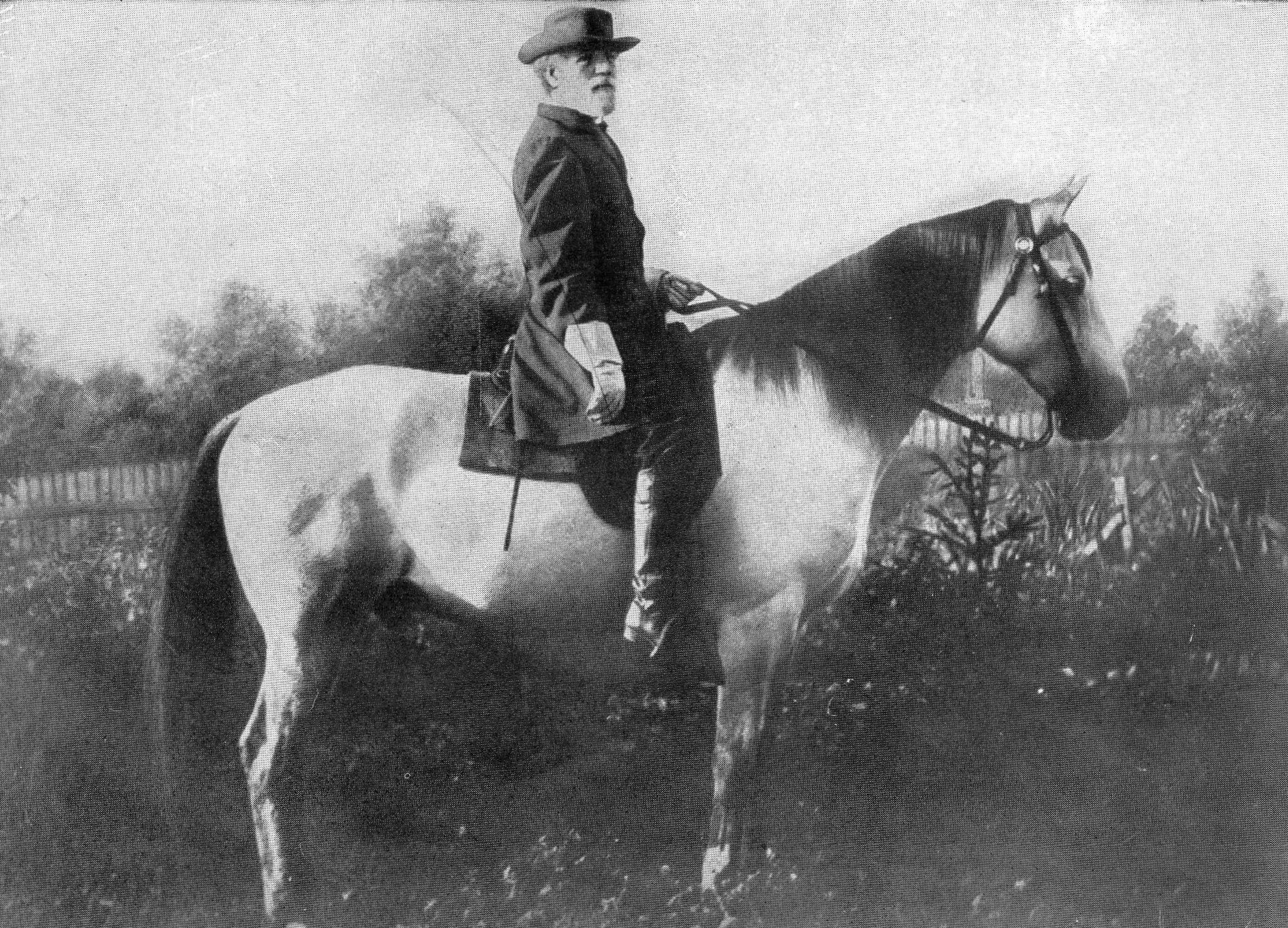
Confederate general Robert E. Lee and Traveller. Cavalry played a significant role in the American Civil War.

During the American Revolutionary War (1775–1783), the Continental Army made relatively little use of cavalry, primarily relying on infantry and a few dragoon regiments. The United States Congress eventually authorized regiments specifically designated as cavalry in 1855. The newly formed American cavalry adopted tactics based on experiences fighting over vast distances during the Mexican War (1846–1848) and against indigenous peoples on the western frontier, abandoning some European traditions.

During the American Civil War (1861–1865), cavalry held the most important and respected role it would ever hold in the American military. (Note: Over one million horses and mules died during the American Civil War.) Field artillery in the American Civil War was also highly mobile. Both horses and mules pulled the guns, though only horses were used on the battlefield. At the beginning of the war, most of the experienced cavalry officers were from the South and thus joined the Confederacy, leading to the Confederate Army's initial battlefield superiority. The tide turned at the 1863 Battle of Brandy Station, part of the Gettysburg campaign, where the Union cavalry, in the largest cavalry battle ever fought on the American continent, (Note: Of a total of 20,500 troops, at least 17,000 were cavalry) ended the dominance of the South. By 1865, Union cavalry were decisive in achieving victory. So important were horses to individual soldiers that the surrender terms at Appomattox allowed every Confederate cavalryman to take his horse home with him. This was because, unlike their Union counterparts, Confederate cavalrymen provided their own horses for service instead of drawing them from the government.

== 20th century ==
Although cavalry was used extensively throughout the world during the 19th century, horses became less important in warfare at the beginning of the 20th century. Light cavalry was still seen on the battlefield, but formal mounted cavalry began to be phased out for combat during and immediately after World War I, although units that included horses still had military uses well into World War II.

=== World War I ===
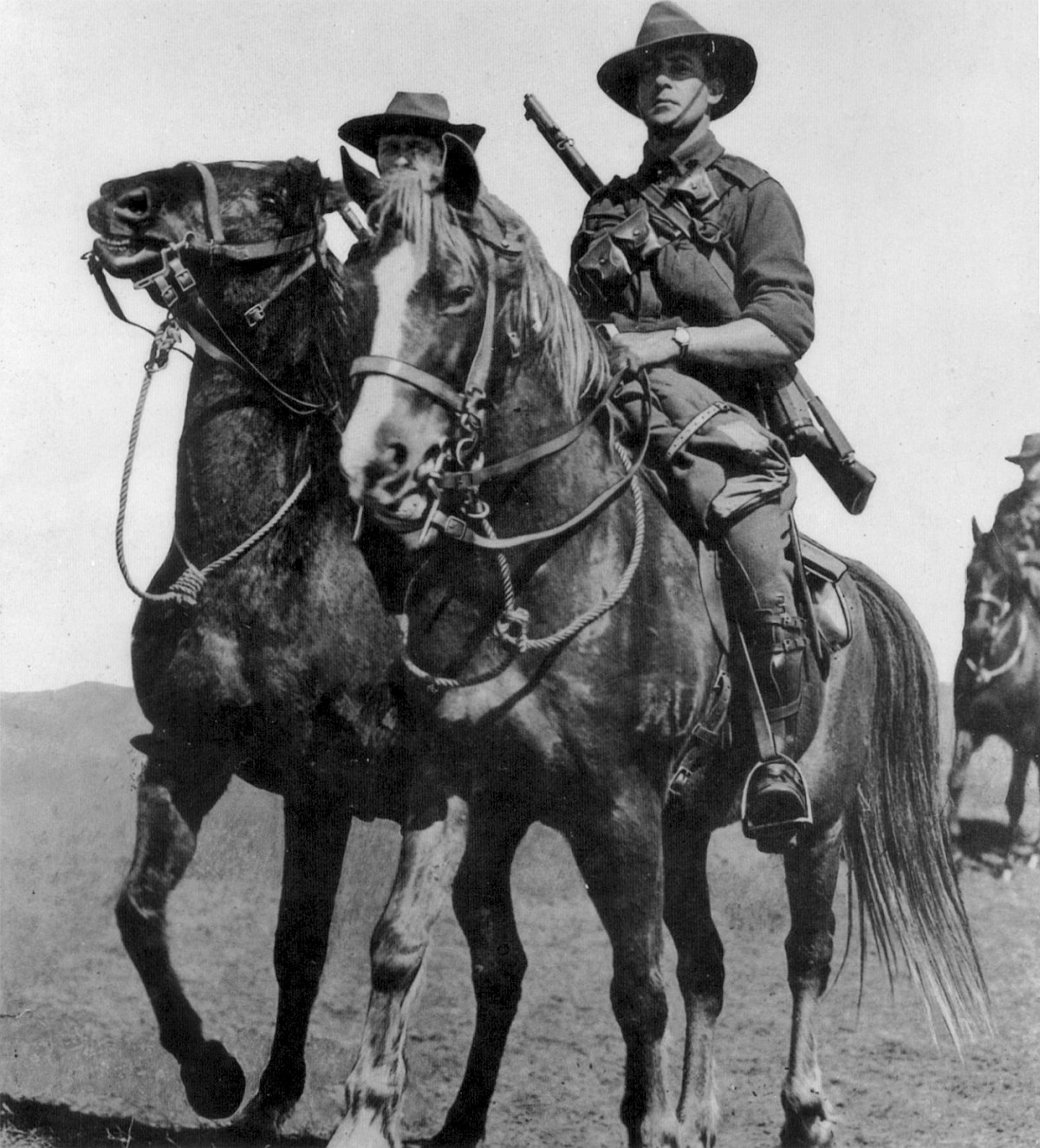
Australian Imperial Force light horsemen, 1914

World War I saw great changes in the use of cavalry. The mode of warfare changed, and the use of trench warfare, barbed wire and machine guns rendered traditional cavalry almost obsolete. Tanks, introduced in 1917, began to take over the role of shock combat.

Early in the War, cavalry skirmishes were common, and horse-mounted troops widely used for reconnaissance. On the Western Front, cavalry were an effective flanking force during the "Race to the Sea" in 1914, but were less useful once trench warfare was established. There a few examples of successful shock combat, and cavalry divisions also provided important mobile firepower. Cavalry played a greater role on the Eastern Front, where trench warfare was less common. On the Eastern Front, and also against the Ottomans, the "cavalry was literally indispensable." British Empire cavalry proved adaptable, since they were trained to fight both on foot and while mounted, while other European cavalry relied primarily on shock action.

On both fronts, the horse was also used as a pack animal. Because railway lines could not withstand artillery bombardments, horses carried ammunition and supplies between the railheads and the rear trenches, though the horses generally were not used in the actual trench zone. This role of horses was critical, and thus horse fodder was the single largest commodity shipped to the front by some countries. Following the war, many cavalry regiments were converted to mechanised, armoured divisions, with light tanks developed to perform many of the cavalry's original roles.

=== World War II ===
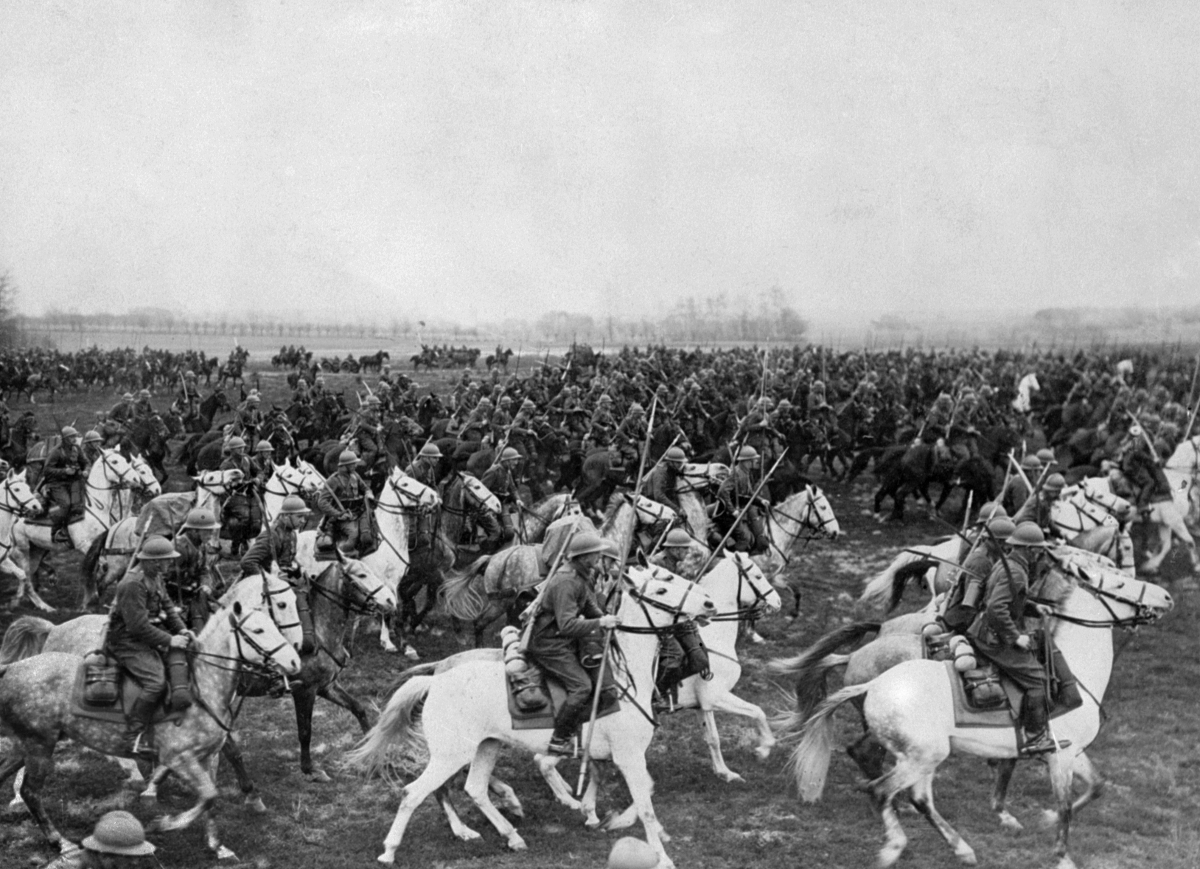
Polish Cavalry during a Polish Army manoeuvre in late 1930s.

Several nations used horse units during World War II. The Polish army used mounted infantry to defend against the armies of Nazi Germany during the 1939 invasion. Both the Germans and the Soviet Union maintained cavalry units throughout the war, particularly on the Eastern Front. The British Army used horses early in the war, and the final British cavalry charge was on March 21, 1942, when the Burma Frontier Force encountered Japanese infantry in central Burma. The only American cavalry unit during World War II was the 26th Cavalry. They challenged the Japanese invaders of Luzon, holding off armoured and infantry regiments during the invasion of the Philippines, repelled a unit of tanks in Binalonan, and successfully held ground for the Allied armies' retreat to Bataan.

Throughout the war, horses and mules were an essential form of transport, especially by the British in the rough terrain of Southern Europe and the Middle East. The United States Army utilised a few cavalry and supply units during the war, but there were concerns that the Americans did not use horses often enough. In the campaigns in North Africa, generals such as George S. Patton lamented their lack, saying, "had we possessed an American cavalry division with pack artillery in Tunisia and in Sicily, not a German would have escaped."

The German and the Soviet armies used horses until the end of the war for transportation of troops and supplies. The German Army, strapped for motorised transport because its factories were needed to produce tanks and aircraft, used around 2.75 million horses – more than it had used in World War I. One German infantry division in Normandy in 1944 had 5,000 horses. The Soviets used 3.5 million horses.

== Recognition ==
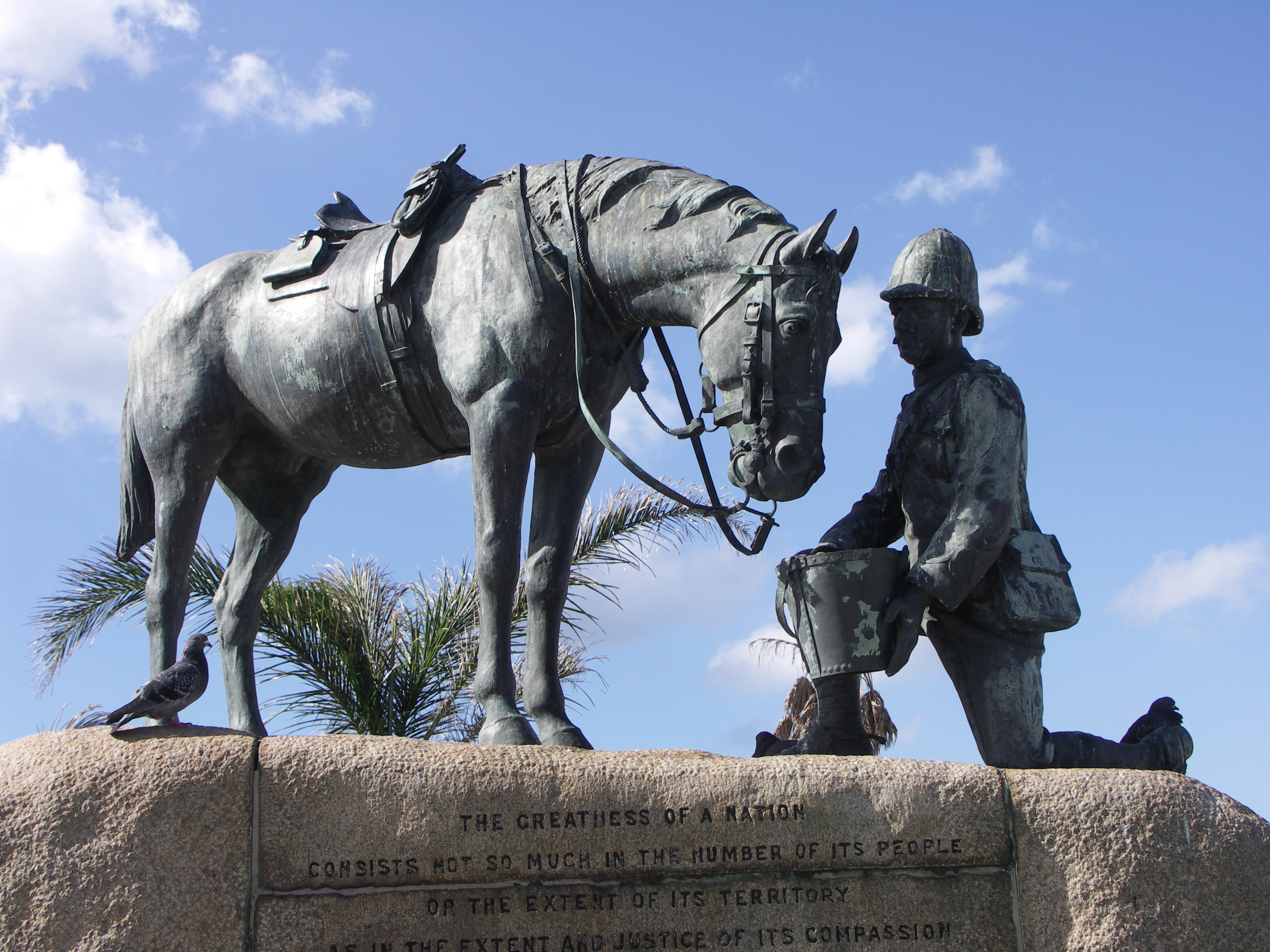
A memorial to the horses that served in the Second Boer War.

While many statues and memorials have been erected to human heroes of war, often shown with horses, a few have also been created specifically to honor horses or animals in general. One example is the Horse Memorial in Port Elizabeth in the Eastern Cape province of South Africa. Both horses and mules are honored in the Animals in War Memorial in London's Hyde Park.

Horses have also at times received medals for extraordinary deeds. After the Charge of the Light Brigade during the Crimean War, a surviving horse named Drummer Boy, ridden by an officer of the 8th Hussars, was given an unofficial campaign medal by his rider that was identical to those awarded to British troops who served in the Crimea, engraved with the horse's name and an inscription of his service. A more formal award was the PDSA Dickin Medal, an animals' equivalent of the Victoria Cross, awarded by the People's Dispensary for Sick Animals charity in the United Kingdom to three horses that served in World War II.

== Modern uses ==
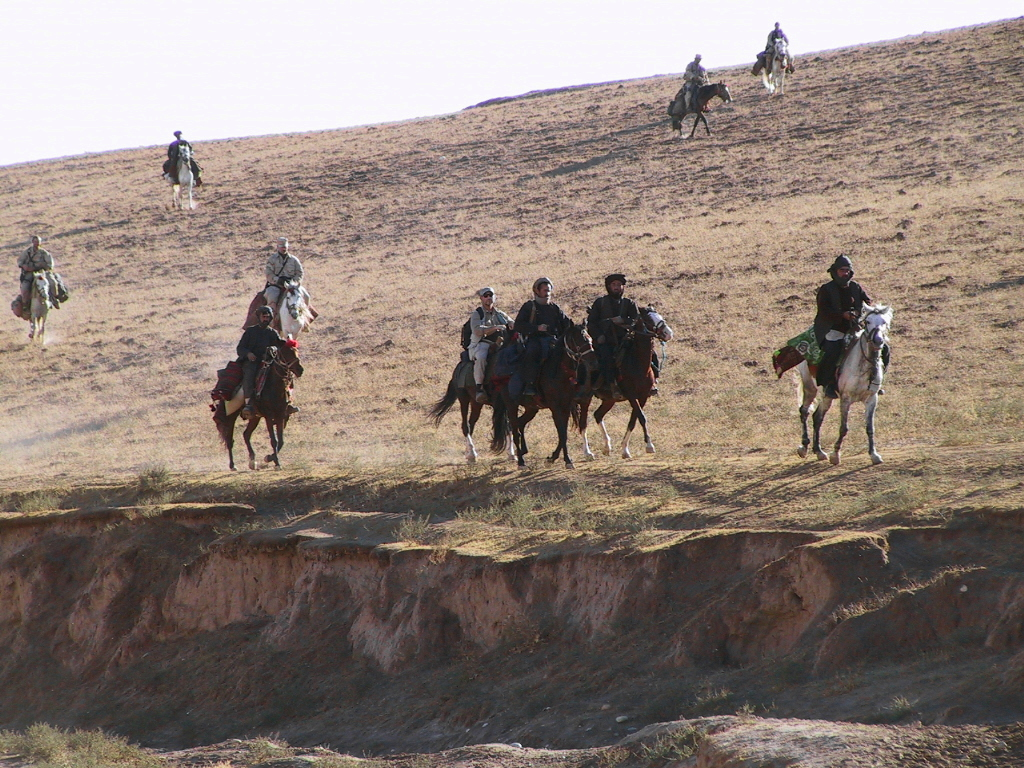
U.S. Special Operations Forces, members of Task Force Dagger, and Afghanistan Commander Abdul Rashid Dostum on horseback in the Dari-a-Souf Valley, Afghanistan, in October 2001.

Today, many of the historical military uses of the horse have evolved into peacetime applications, including exhibitions, historical reenactments, work of peace officers, and competitive events. Formal combat units of mounted cavalry are mostly a thing of the past, with horseback units within the modern military used for reconnaissance, ceremonial, or crowd control purposes. With the rise of mechanised technology, horses in formal national militias were displaced by tanks and armored fighting vehicles, often still referred to as "cavalry".

=== Active military ===
Organised armed fighters on horseback are occasionally seen. The best-known current examples are the Janjaweed, militia groups seen in the Darfur region of Sudan, who became notorious for their attacks upon unarmed civilian populations in the Darfur conflict. Many nations still maintain small numbers of mounted military units for certain types of patrol and reconnaissance duties in extremely rugged terrain, including the conflict in Afghanistan. Horses and donkeys have been used by Russia's army for supply and reinforcement in the Russian invasion of Ukraine, as vehicular resupply became dangerous due to the prevalence of attack drones.

At the beginning of Operation Enduring Freedom, Operational Detachment Alpha 595 teams were covertly inserted into Afghanistan on October 19, 2001. Horses were the only suitable method of transport in the difficult mountainous terrain of Northern Afghanistan. They were the first U.S. soldiers to ride horses into battle since January 16, 1942, when the U.S. Army's 26th Cavalry Regiment charged an advanced guard of the 14th Japanese Army as it advanced from Manila.

The only remaining operationally ready, fully horse-mounted regular regiment in the world is the Indian Army's 61st Cavalry.

During the Gaza war, Al-Qassam Brigades soldiers were documented using horse drawn carts for transportation.

=== Law enforcement and public safety ===
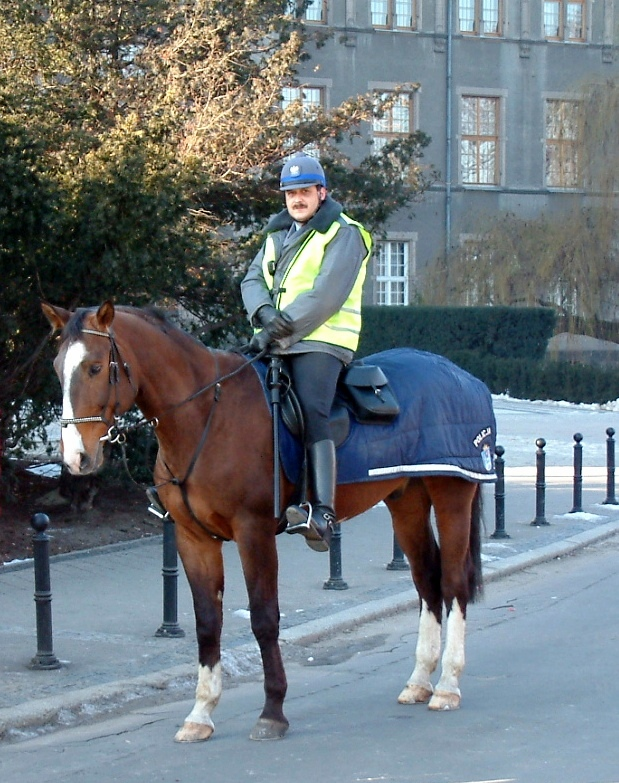
Mounted police in Poznań, Poland

Mounted police have been used since the 18th century, and still are used worldwide to control traffic and crowds, patrol public parks, keep order in processionals and during ceremonies and perform general street patrol duties. Today, many cities still have mounted police units. In rural areas, horses are used by law enforcement for mounted patrols over rugged terrain, crowd control at religious shrines, and border patrol.

In rural areas, law enforcement that operates outside of incorporated cities may also have mounted units. These include specially deputised, paid or volunteer mounted search and rescue units sent into roadless areas on horseback to locate missing people. Law enforcement in protected areas may use horses in places where mechanised transport is difficult or prohibited. Horses can be an essential part of an overall team effort as they can move faster on the ground than a human on foot, can transport heavy equipment, and provide a more rested rescue worker when a subject is found.

=== Ceremonial and educational uses ===
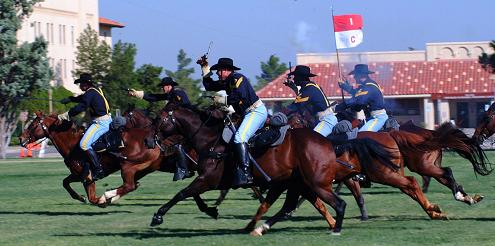
Horse Cavalry Detachment of the U.S. Army's 1st Cavalry Division demonstrating a mock cavalry charge at Fort Bliss, Texas

Many countries throughout the world maintain traditionally trained and historically uniformed cavalry units for ceremonial, exhibition, or educational purposes. One example is the Horse Cavalry Detachment of the U.S. Army's 1st Cavalry Division. This unit of active duty soldiers approximates the weapons, tools, equipment and techniques used by the United States Cavalry in the 1880s. It is seen at change of command ceremonies and other public appearances. A similar detachment is the Governor General's Horse Guards, Canada's Household Cavalry regiment, the last remaining mounted cavalry unit in the Canadian Forces. Nepal's King's Household Cavalry is a ceremonial unit with over 100 horses and is the remainder of the Nepalese cavalry that existed since the 19th century. An important ceremonial use is in military funerals, which often have a caparisoned horse as part of the procession, "to symbolize that the warrior will never ride again".

Horses are also used in many historical reenactments. Reenactors try to recreate the conditions of the battle or tournament with equipment that is as authentic as possible.

=== Equestrian sport ===
Modern-day Olympic equestrian events are rooted in cavalry skills and classical horsemanship. The first equestrian events at the Olympics were introduced in 1912, and through 1948, competition was restricted to active-duty officers on military horses. Only after 1952, as mechanisation of warfare reduced the number of military riders, were civilian riders allowed to compete. Dressage traces its origins to Xenophon and his works on cavalry training methods, developing further during the Renaissance in response to a need for different tactics in battles where firearms were used. The three-phase competition known as Eventing developed out of cavalry officers' needs for versatile, well-schooled horses. Though show jumping developed largely from fox hunting, the cavalry considered jumping to be good training for their horses, and leaders in the development of modern riding techniques over fences, such as Federico Caprilli, came from military ranks. Beyond the Olympic disciplines are other events with military roots. Competitions with weapons, such as mounted shooting and tent pegging, test the combat skills of mounted riders.

== See also ==
- Equestrianism
- Great Stirrup Controversy
- List of historical military horses
- List of horses of the American Civil War
- French cavalry during World War I

== Sources ==
- Adkins, Roy; Adkins, Lesley (1998). Handbook to Life in Ancient Rome. Oxford: Oxford University Press. ISBN 0-19-512332-8. ISBN 0-19-512491-X
- Azevedo, Mario Joaquim (2004). Roots of Violence: A History of War in Chad. New York: Routledge. ISBN 90-5699-583-9.
- Baker, Ira Osborn (1918). A Treatise on Roads and Pavements (3rd ed.). New York: John Wiley & Sons, Inc. p. 22. OCLC 1628818. "horse pulling weight."
- Barber, Richard (2005). The Reign of Chivalry (2nd ed.). Woodbridge, UK: Boydell Press. ISBN 1-84383-182-1.
- Barker, Juliet (1986). The Tournament in England: 1100–1400. UK: Boydell Press. ISBN 0-85115-942-7.
- Bennett, Deb (1998). Conquerors: The Roots of New World Horsemanship (1st ed.). Solvang, CA: Amigo Publications Inc. ISBN 0-9658533-0-6.
- Bennett, Matthew (2001). Dictionary of Ancient & Medieval Warfare. Mechanicsburg, PA: Stackpole Books. ISBN 0-8117-2610-X.
- Bennett, Matthew; Bradbury, Jim; DeVries, Kelly; Dickie, Iain; Jestice, Phyllis (2005). Fighting Techniques of the Medieval World: Equipment, Combat Skills and Tactics. New York: Thomas Dunne Books. ISBN 0-312-34820-7.
- Bongard-Levin, G. M. (1985). Ancient Indian Civilization. New Delhi: Arnold-Heinemann. OCLC 12667676.
- Bryant, Jennifer O. (2000). Olympic Equestrian: The Sports and the Stories from Stockholm to Sydney (1st ed.). Canada: The Blood-Horse, Inc. ISBN 1-58150-044-0.
- Budiansky, Stephen (1997). The Nature of Horses. New York: Free Press. ISBN 0-684-82768-9.
- Bumke, Joachim (2000). Courtly Culture: Literature and Society in the High Middle Ages. Translated by Dunlap, Thomas. Woodstock, NY: Overlook Duckworth. ISBN 1-58567-051-0.
- Carey, Brian Todd; Allfree, Joshua B.; Cairns, John (2006). Warfare in the Medieval World. Barnsley, UK: Pen & Sword Military. ISBN 1-84415-339-8.
- Carver, Michael (1984). The Seven Ages of the British Army. London: Weidenfeld & Nicolson. ISBN 0-297-78373-4.
- Carver, Michael (1998). Britain's Army in the 20th Century. London: Macmillan. ISBN 0-333-73777-6.
- Chamberlin, J. Edward (2006). Horse: How the Horse Has Shaped Civilizations. Bluebridge. ISBN 0-9742405-9-1.
- Clark, John (2004). "Introduction: Horses and Horsemen in Medieval London". In Clark, John (ed.). The Medieval Horse and its Equipment: c. 1150–c. 1450. Contributions by Brian Spencer and D. james Rackam (Rev. 2nd ed.). Woodbridge, UK: Boydell Press. ISBN 978-1-84383-097-9.
- Cocker, Mark (2000). Rivers of Blood, Rivers of Gold: Europe's Conquest of Indigenous Peoples (1st American ed.). New York: Grove Press. ISBN 0-8021-3801-2.
- Crowell, Pers (1951). Cavalcade of American Horses. New York: McGraw-Hill Book Company. OCLC 1428574.
- Curta, Florin; Kovalev, Roman, eds. (2007). The other Euorope in the Middle Ages: Avars, Bulgars, Khazars and Cumans. Kononklijke Brill NY. p. 319. ISBN 978-90-0416389-8.
- Davies, Norman (2005). God's Playground: A History of Poland: Volume II 1795 to the Present (Revised ed.). Oxford, UK: Oxford University Press. ISBN 0-19-925340-4.
- Davis, R. H. C. (1989). The Medieval Warhorse. London: Thames and Hudson. ISBN 0-500-25102-9.
- Devereux, Frederick L (1979). The Cavalry Manual of Horse Management (Reprint of 1941 ed.). Cranbury, NJ: A. S. Barnes. ISBN 0-498-02371-0.
- Drower, Margaret S. (1973). "Syria c. 1550–1400 BC". The Cambridge Ancient History: The Middle East and the Aegean Region c. 1800–1380 BC Volume II Part I (Third ed.). Cambridge, UK: Cambridge University Press. pp. 417–525. ISBN 0-521-29823-7.
- Ebrey, Patricia Buckley; Walthall, Anne; Palais, James B. (2005). Pre-Modern East Asia: A Cultural, Social, and Political History. Boston: Houghton Mifflin Company. ISBN 0-618-13386-0.
- Edwards, Elwyn Hartley; Geddes, Candida, eds. (1987). The Complete Horse Book. North Pomfret, VT: Trafalgar Square, Inc. ISBN 0-943955-00-9.
- Edwards, Elwyn Hartley (1994). The Encyclopedia of the Horse (1st American ed.). New York: Dorling Kindersley. ISBN 1-56458-614-6.
- Edwards, Gladys Brown (1973). The Arabian: War Horse to Show Horse (Revised Collectors ed.). Covina, CA: Arabian Horse Association of Southern California, Rich Publishing. ISBN 0-938276-00-X. OCLC 1148763.
- Ellis, John (2004). Cavalry: The History of Mounted Warfare. Pen & Sword Military Classics. Barnsley, UK: Pen and Sword. ISBN 1-84415-096-8.
- Ensminger, M. E. (1990). Horses and Horsemanship: Animal Agriculture Series (Sixth ed.). Danville, IL: Interstate Publishers. ISBN 0-8134-2883-1.
- Equine Research (1978). Equine Genetics & Selection Procedures. Grand Prairie, TX: Equine Research, Inc. OCLC 4750182.
- France, John (1999). Western Warfare in the Age of the Crusades 1000–1300. Ithaca, NY: Cornell University Press. ISBN 0-8014-8607-6.
- Gies, Frances; Gies, Joseph (2005). Daily Life in Medieval Times (2nd ed.). Hoo, UK: Grange Books. ISBN 1-84013-811-4.
- Goodrich, L. Carrington (1959). A Short History of the Chinese People (Third ed.). New York: Harper Torchbooks. ISBN 0-04-951015-0. OCLC 3388796.
- Gordon, Stewart (1998). "The Limited Adoption of European-style Military Forces by Eighteenth Century Rulers in India" (PDF). Indian Economic and Social History Review. 35 (3): 229. doi:10.1177/001946469803500301. hdl:2027.42/67903. S2CID 144736169.
- Gravett, Christopher (2002). English Medieval Knight 1300–1400. Oxford: Osprey Publishing. ISBN 1-84176-145-1.
- Gravett, Christopher (2006). Tudor Knight. Oxford: Osprey Publishing. ISBN 1-84176-970-3.
- Hale, J. R. (1986). War and society in Renaissance Europe, 1450–1620. Baltimore: Johns Hopkins University Press. ISBN 0-8018-3196-2.
- Hamblin, William James (2006). Warfare in the Ancient Near East to 1600 BC: Holy Warriors at the Dawn of History. New York: Routledge. ISBN 0-415-25589-9.
- Haythornthwaite, Philip J. (1987). British Infantry of the Napoleonic Wars. London: Arms and Armour Press. ISBN 0-85368-890-7.
- Haythornthwaite, Philip J. (1995). The Colonial Wars Source Book. London: Arms and Armour Press. ISBN 1-85409-196-4.
- Hitti, Phillip K. (1957). Lebanon in History. London: MacMillan and Co. OCLC 185202493.
- Holmes, Richard, ed. (2001). The Oxford Companion to Military History. Oxford: Oxford University Press. ISBN 0-19-866209-2.
- Hope, Charles Evelyn Graham (1972). The Horseman's Manual. New York: Charles Scribner's Sons. ISBN 0-684-13622-8.
- Hyland, Ann (1990). Equus: The Horse in the Roman world. New Haven, CT: Yale University Press. ISBN 0-300-04770-3.
- Hyland, Ann (1994). The Medieval Warhorse: From Byzantium to the Crusades. London: Grange Books. ISBN 1-85627-990-1.
- Hyland, Ann (1998). The Warhorse 1250–1600. UK: Sutton Publishing. ISBN 0-7509-0746-0.
- Jones, Kristine L. (2000). "Warfare Reorganization and Readaptation at the Margins of Spanish Rule: The Southern Margin". The Cambridge History of the Native Peoples of the Americas. Vol. III South America Part 2. Cambridge University Press. OCLC 33359444.
- Keegan, John (1994). A History of Warfare (1st ed.). Vintage Books. ISBN 0-679-73082-6.
- Kinloch, Terry (2005). Echoes of Gallipoli: In the Words of New Zealand's Mounted Riflemen. Auckland: Exisle Publishing. ISBN 0-908988-60-5.
- Krebs, Robert E. (2004). Groundbreaking Scientific Experiments, Inventions, and Discoveries of the Middle Ages and the Renaissance: Middle Ages and the Renaissance. Greenwood Publishing Group. ISBN 0-313-32433-6.
- Kupper, J. R. (1973). "Egypt: From the Death of Ammenemes III to Seqenenre II". The Cambridge Ancient History: The Middle East and the Aegean Region c. 1800–1380 BC Volume II Part I (Third ed.). Cambridge, UK: Cambridge University Press. pp. 42–76. ISBN 0-521-29823-7.
- Law, Robin (1980). The horse in West African history: the role of the horse in the societies of pre-colonial West Africa. Oxford & New York: Oxford University Press. ISBN 0-19-724206-5.
- Mitchell, Elyne (1982). Light Horse: The Story of Australia's Mounted Troops. Melbourne: MacMillan. ISBN 0-7251-0389-2.
- Needham, Joseph (1986). Science and Civilization in China. Vol. 4: Physics and Physical Technology, Part 2, Mechanical Engineering. Taipei: Caves Books Ltd. OCLC 48999277.
- Nicolle, David (1990). Attila and the Nomad Hordes: Warfare on the Eurasian steppes 4th–12th centuries. London: Osprey Publishing. ISBN 0-85045-996-6.
- Nicolle, David (1996). Crusader Knight. Oxford: Osprey Publishing. ISBN 1-85532-934-4.
- Nicolle, David (1998). Medieval Warfare Source Book: Christian Europe and its Neighbors. Leicester: Brockhampton Press. ISBN 1-86019-861-9.
- Nicolle, David (1999). Medieval Warfare Source Book: Warfare In Western Christendom. Dubai: Brockhampton Press. ISBN 1-86019-889-9.
- Nicolle, David (2002). Companion to Medieval Arms and Armour. London: Boydell Press. ISBN 0-85115-872-2.
- Nofi, Albert A. (1993). The Waterloo Campaign: June 1815. US: Da Capo Press. ISBN 0-938289-98-5.
- Oakeshott, Ewart (1998). A Knight and His Horse. Chester Springs, PA: Dufour Editions. ISBN 0-8023-1297-7.
- Olmstead, A. T. (1959). History of Persian Empire. Chicago: University of Chicago Press. ISBN 0-226-62777-2.
- Parker, Geoffrey, ed. (1995). Warfare: The Triumph of the West. Cambridge: Cambridge University Press. ISBN 0-521-79431-5.
- Pakenham, Thomas (1979). The Boer War. New York: Random House. ISBN 0-394-42742-4.
- Partiger, F. E. (1997). Ancient Indian Historical Tradition (Reprint ed.). Delhi: Motilal Banarsidass. OCLC 247010245.
- Prestwich, Michael (1996). Armies and Warfare in the Middle Ages: The English Experience. New Haven: Yale University Press. ISBN 0-300-07663-0.
- Price, Steven D.; Burt, Don (1998). The American Quarter Horse: An Introduction to Selection, Care, and Enjoyment. Globe Pequot. ISBN 1-55821-643-X.
- Pritchard, James B. (1958). The Ancient Near East. Vol. 1. Princeton, NJ: Princeton University Press. ISBN 0-691-03532-6. OCLC 382004.
- Raychaudhuri, Hemchandra (1996). Political History of Ancient India. New York: Oxford University Press. ISBN 0-19-564376-3.
- Robards, Brooks (1997). The Medieval Knight at War. London: Tiger Books. ISBN 1-85501-919-1.
- Sadler, John (2005). Border Fury: England and Scotland at War 1296–1568. UK: Pearson Education Ltd. ISBN 1-4058-4022-6.
- Sastri, K. A. Nilakanta (1967). Age of the Nandas and Mauryas. Delhi: Motilal Banarsidass. ISBN 81-208-0466-X. OCLC 248749546.
- Sinha, Ganesh Prasad (1972). Post-Gupta Polity (A.D. 500–750): A Study of the Growth of Feudal Elements and Rural Administration. Calcutta: Punthi Pustak. OCLC 695415.
- Trench, Charles Chenevix (1970). A History of Horsemanship. London: Doubleday and Company. ISBN 0-385-03109-2.
- Tucker, Spencer; Roberts, Priscilla Mary (2004). Encyclopedia of World War II: A Political, Social and Military History. Santa Barbara, CA: ABC-CLIO. ISBN 1-57607-999-6.
- Turnbull, Stephen R. (2002). War in Japan 1467–1615. Essential Histories. Oxford, UK: Osprey Publishing. ISBN 1-84176-480-9.
- Urwin, Gregory J. W. (1983). The United States Cavalry: An Illustrated History. Poole, UK: Blandford Books. ISBN 0-7137-1219-8.
- Warry, John Gibson (2000). Warfare in the Classical World. New York: Barnes & Noble. ISBN 0-7607-1696-X.
- Willetts, R. F. (1980). "The Minoans". In Cotterell, Arthur (ed.). The Penguin Encyclopedia of Ancient Civilizations. New York: Penguin Books. ISBN 0-14-011434-3.
- Willmott, H. P. (2003). First World War. Dorling Kindersley Limited. ISBN 1-4053-0029-9.
- Whitby, Michael (2002). Rome at War 229–696 AD. Oxford, UK: Osprey Publishing. ISBN 1-84176-359-4.
