= Ann Hyland =

- Occupation: Writer
- Writing career
- Subjects: Equestrianism; Development of the horse Horses in warfare

Ann Hyland is a writer and historian who specialises in equestrianism and the development of horses. She is also a consultant for the Oxford English Dictionary.

Ann Hyland trains horses as well as being a freelance lecturer on equestrian topics.

== Select bibliography ==
- Beginner's Guide to Western Riding (1971)
- Foal to Five Years (1980)
- The Endurance Horse (1988)
- Riding Long Distance (1988)
- Equus: The Horse in the Roman World (1990)
- The Appaloosa (1990)
- Training the Roman Cavalry (1993)
- The Medieval Warhorse: From Byzantium to the Crusades (1994)
- The Warhorse: 1250–1600 (1998)
- The Horse in the Middle Ages (1999)
- The Quarter Horse (1999)
- The Horse in the Ancient World (2003)
- The Warhorse in the Modern Era: Breeder to Battlefield 1600 to 1865 (2009)
- The Warhorse in the Modern Era: The Boer War to the Beginning of the Second Millennium (2010)
