= Afghan Mountains semi-desert =

Ecoregion in Afghanistan

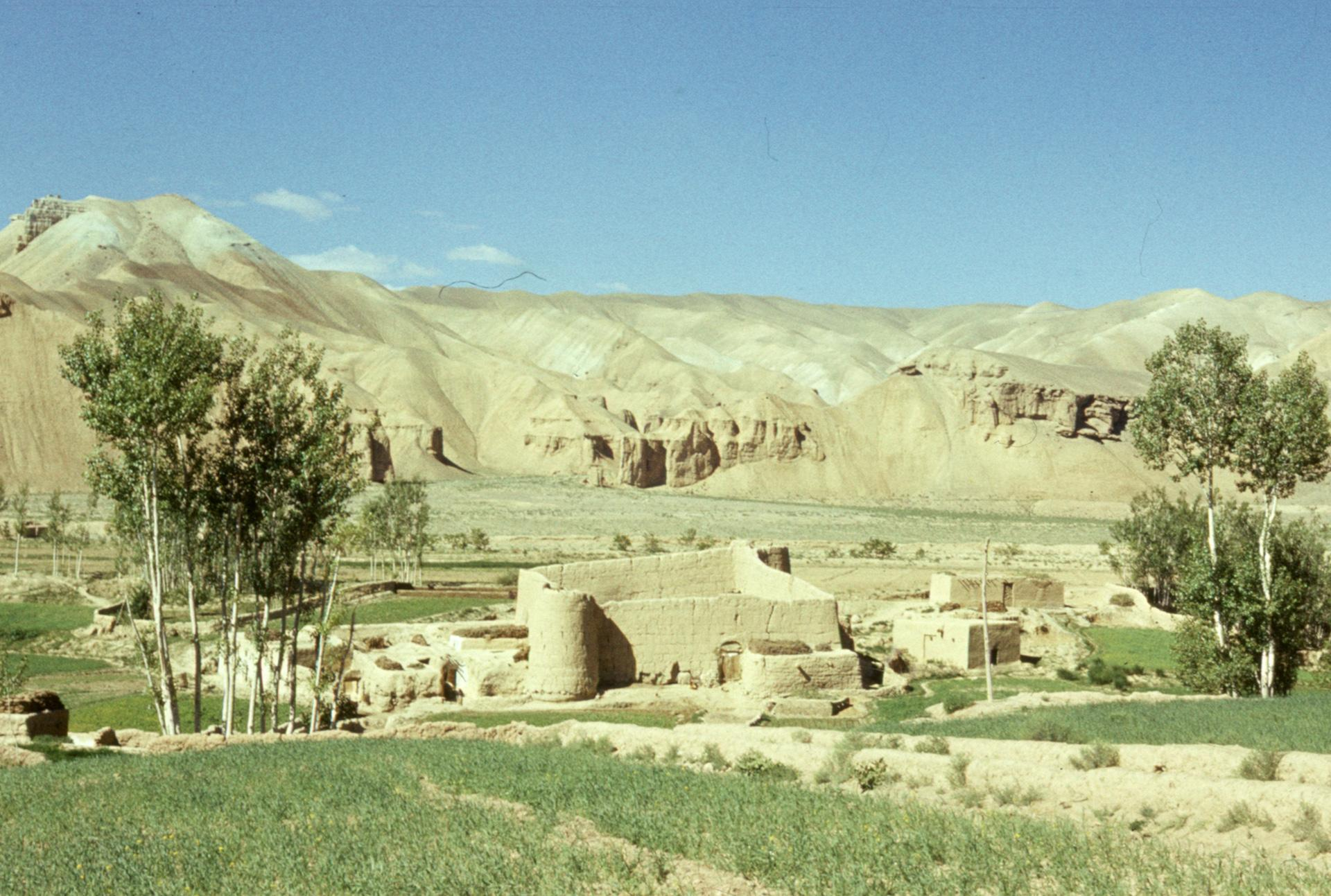
- Bamyan Valley, Afghanistan

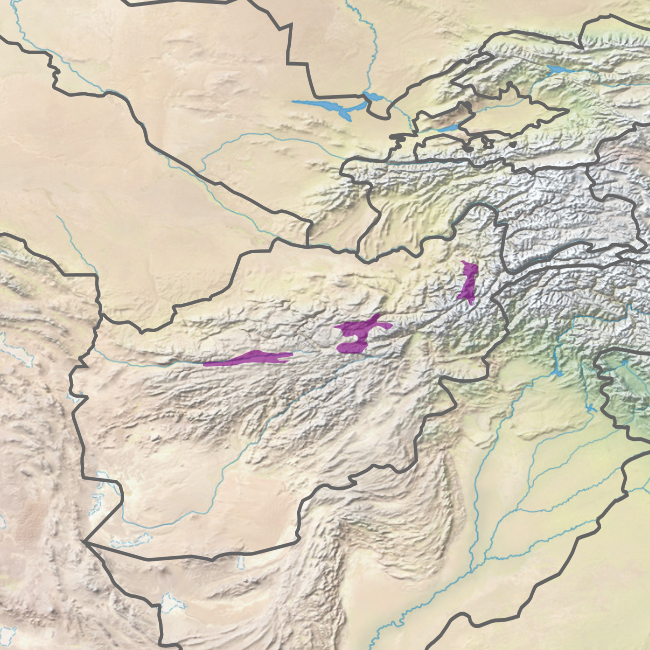
- Map of the Afghan Mountains Semi-Desert Ecoregion

Ecology
- Realm: Palearctic
- Biome: Deserts and xeric shrublands

Geography
- Area: 13,713 km^{2} (5,295 sq mi)
- Country: Afghanistan
- Coordinates: 34.75°N 67.75°E

The Afghan Mountains semi-desert ecoregion (WWF ID: PA1301) covers three disconnected interior valleys in the north of the mountains of Afghanistan. These valleys are arid (250–300 mm/year of precipitation), and covered mostly in thorny shrubs. Overgrazing by livestock has put pressure on the grasses and the wild animals dependent on them.

== Location and description ==
The valleys of this ecoregion lie along the central mountain range of Afghanistan, the Koh-i-Baba, a western extension of the Hindu Kush. The western sector of this ecoregion is on the valley of the Hari River around the town of Chaghcharan. The middle sector covers the Bamyan Valley at an altitude of 2,550 metres (8,370 ft). The easternmost sector is in Badakhshan Province on the northern slope of the mountains 100 km north of Jalalabad. The terrain ranges in elevation from 1,155 to 5,497 metres (3,789 to 18,035 ft), with an average of 2,897 metres (9,505 ft).

== Climate ==
The climate of the ecoregion is Humid continental climate - Warm, dry summer sub-type (Köppen climate classification Dsb), with large seasonal temperature differentials and a warm summer (no month averaging over 22 °C (72 °F), and at least four months averaging over 10 °C (50 °F). The driest month between April and September has less than 1/3 the precipitation of the wettest month. In this ecoregion, average precipitation is 250–300 mm/year.

== Flora and fauna ==
The ground cover in the ecoregion is about 2/3 herbaceous cover and 1/3 bare. The vegetation is mostly open cover thorny shrub, the height of which is generally under 1.5 metres (4.9 ft). Significant vegetation tends to occur along dry river beds. There are only 95 vertebrate species recorded in the ecoregion, none of which are endemic. Overgrazing has degraded the grass-like vegetation (Graminoids). Species of conservation interest include the near-threatened Argali (Ovis ammon), the near-threatened striped hyena (Hyaena hyaena), and the endangered white-bellied musk deer (Moschus leucogaster).

== Protected areas ==
Less than 2% of the ecoregion is officially protected. A 2017 estimate of the protected area included only 569 square kilometers. These protected areas include:

- Band-e Amir National Park (a portion is in the ecoregion).
- Ajar Valley Nature Reserve
