= A History of Warfare =

1993 book by John Keegan

- Author: John Keegan
- Language: English
- Subject: War
- Publisher: Random House
- Publication date: 1993
- Media type: Print
- Pages: 432
- ISBN: 978-0679730828

A History of Warfare is a 1993 book by military historian John Keegan, which was published by Random House.

== Summary ==
Keegan discusses early warfare, the proliferation of Bronze Age warfare and then Iron Age warfare (Greek hoplites and phalanxes, Roman legions and maniples). He also talks about the conquests of the "horse peoples", first under the Assyrians, then the Achaemenids, Parthians and Sassanids; then in the 7th century the Arabs conquer a lot of territory, followed by the Mongols under Genghis Khan and finally the last of the horse peoples under a Mongol named Tamerlane, who unleashes massive carnage and destruction.

The rise of medieval Europe causes the raising of money for castles, with infantry being paid to dig under castles for their destruction. Western Europe perfects castles that are impregnable. At the same time, cavalry is gradually eliminated from the battlefield; matchlocks, flintlocks and eventually Smith & Wesson revolvers become dominant (they help Japan win the Russo-Japanese War).

In World War I, mustard gas, grenades, artillery and guns kill a massive number of soldiers that are buried in muddy graveyards on the Western Front. In World War II, millions die on the Eastern Front because of Adolf Hitler's theories of living space (Lebensraum).

Keegan takes issue with Carl von Clausewitz's idea that war is an extension of politics, implying that war is carried on in a rational way under the conscious control of politicians. Rather he sees the existence of armies and warriors as distorting the nature of politics and of culture, sometimes becoming the dominant cultural form and that war itself is ultimately a disastrous and irrational outcome of a failure of politics and diplomacy. His book is less concerned with the technology and lists of battles than with the underlying motivations and social anthropology of the same.

Keegan dedicates his book to an ancestor, a Lieutenant Bridgman in the Régiment de Clare, one of the Wild Geese mercenaries of the French Army, who was killed at the Battle of Lauffeld in 1747.

== Reception ==
The New York Times Book Review praised A History of Warfare as "perhaps the most remarkable study of warfare that has yet been written.”

The New Yorker hailed it as a masterpiece, stating “it is one of those rare books which could still be required reading in its field a hundred years from now.”

Kirkus Reviews praised the book for its vivid, thorough and engaging treatment of its subject, noting “with his usual fluent mastery, Keegan offers provocative perspectives on armed conflict through the ages.”

In a review in Foreign Affairs, Eliot A. Cohen wrote, "Despite some graceful writing and pointed observations, A History of Warfare fails to live up to the title's promise or the author's reputation". Cohen described it as "a vendetta against a liberal German soldier-theorist of the early nineteenth century [Clausewitz]".
